= Jesup North Pacific Expedition =

Anthropological expedition to Siberia

The Jesup North Pacific Expedition (1897–1902) was a major anthropological expedition to Siberia, Alaska, and the northwest coast of Canada. The purpose of the expedition was to investigate the relationships among the peoples at each side of the Bering Strait.

The multi-year expedition was sponsored by American industrialist-philanthropist Morris Jesup (who was among other things the president of the American Museum of Natural History). It was planned and directed by the American anthropologist Franz Boas. The participants included a number of significant figures in American and Russian anthropology, as well as Bernard Fillip Jacobsen (brother of Johan Adrian Jacobsen), a Norwegian, who settled in the Northwest coast in 1884 where he collected artifacts as well as the stories of the local indigenous people. Local people of the tribes, such as George Hunt (Tlingit), served as interpreters and guides.

The expedition resulted in the publication of numerous important ethnographies from 1905 into the 1930s, as well as valuable collections of artifacts and photographs.

== Fieldwork sites ==
The ethnic groups studied by members of the expedition include:

- Ainu
- Tsilhqot'in (Chilcotin, British Columbia)
- Chukchi (Chukchee)
- Evens (Lamut)
- Evenk (Tungus)
- Haida
- Heiltsuk (Bella Bella)
- Itel'men (Kamchadal)
- Kwakwaka'wakw (Kwakiutl)
- St'at'imc (Lillooet) (British Columbia)
- Nlaka'pamux (Thompson) (British Columbia)
- Syilx (Okanagan) (British Columbia)

== Official publications ==
Many of the scientific results of the expedition were published in a special series, Publications of the Jesup North Pacific Expedition (New York: American Museum of Natural History, 1898-1903 [and] Leiden : E.J. Brill; New York : G.E. Stechert, 1905–1930). The titles of these publications give a good idea of the huge scope of the expedition:

Volume	Title	Author (links to sections below)	Year
v. 1, pt. 1	Facial Paintings of the Indians of northern British Columbia	Franz Boas	1898
v. 1, pt. 2	The Mythology of the Bella Coola Indians	Franz Boas	1898
v. 1, pt. 3	Archaeology of Lytton, British Columbia	Harlan Ingersoll Smith	1899
v. 1, pt. 4	The Thompson Indians of British Columbia	James Alexander Teit; edited by Franz Boas	1900
v. 1, pt. 5	Basketry designs of the Salish Indians	Livingston Farrand	1900
v. 1, pt. 6	Archaeology of the Thompson River Region, British Columbia	Harlan Ingersoll Smith	1900
v. 2, pt. 1	Traditions of the Chilcotin Indians	Livingston Farrand	1900
v. 2, pt. 2	Cairns of British Columbia and Washington	Harlan Ingersoll Smith and Gerard Fowke	1901
v. 2, pt. 3	Traditions of the Quinault Indians	Livingston Farrand, assisted by W.S. Kahnweiler	1902
v. 2, pt. 4	Shell-heaps of the lower Fraser River, British Columbia	Harlan Ingersoll Smith	1903
v. 2, pt. 5	The Lillooet Indians	James Alexander Teit	1906
v. 2, pt. 6	Archaeology of the Gulf of Georgia and Puget Sound	Harlan Ingersoll Smith	1907
v. 2, pt. 7	The Shuswap	James Alexander Teit	1909
v. 3	Kwakiutl texts	Franz Boas and George Hunt	1905
v. 4	The decorative art of the Amur tribes	Berthold Laufer	1902
v. 5, pt. 1	Contributions to the ethnology of the Haida	John R. Swanton	1905
v. 5, pt. 2	The Kwakiutl of Vancouver Island	Franz Boas	1909
v. 6	The Koryaks	Waldemar Jochelson	1908
v. 7	The Chukchee	Waldemar Bogoras	1904–1909
v. 8, pt. 1	Chukchee Mythology	Waldemar Bogoras	1910
v. 8, pt. 2	Mythology of the Thompson Indians	James Alexander Teit	1912
v. 8, pt. 3	The Eskimo of Siberia	Waldemar Bogoras	1913
v. 9	The Yukaghir and Yukaghirized Tungus	Waldemar Jochelson	1926
v. 10, pt. 1	Kwakiutl Texts, second series	Franz Boas and George Hunt	1906
v. 10, pt. 2	Haida Texts, Masset Dialect	John R. Swanton	1908
v. 11	Craniology of the North Pacific Coast	Bruno Oetteking	1930
[v. 12]	Ethnographical album of the North Pacific coasts of America and Asia		1900

Other results of the expedition were published separately. Waldemar Bogoras's grammar of Chukchi, Koryak and Itelmen (misleadingly titled just Chukchee) was delayed by the onset of the First World War and Russian Revolution. It was eventually published (heavily edited by Boas) in the Handbook of American Indian Languages.

== Expedition direction ==
=== Franz Boas ===
Franz Boas, one of the pioneers of modern anthropology, was the scientific director of the expedition. At the time of the expedition he was assistant curator of the anthropology department at the American Museum of Natural History. He planned the research to address three questions:

- the origin of the early inhabitants of America
- the biological relationship between the peoples of America and the peoples of Asia
- the relationships between the cultures of the peoples of America and the peoples of Asia

Boas was an active fieldworker on the northwest coast in the American part of the expedition.

=== Morris Jesup ===
Morris Ketchum Jesup, a wealthy industrialist and director of the American Museum of Natural History, initially invited contributions from benefactors to the museum, but ended up assuming the entire expense of the project himself.

== Fieldworkers in Russia ==
The Siberian fieldwork began a year later. There were three teams, one in the south and two in the north. The southern team comprised Berthold Laufer and Gerard Fowke. Bogoras and Jochelson each had a team in the north.

=== Waldemar Bogoras ===
Waldemar Bogoras was an exiled Russian revolutionary; ethnographic and linguistic fieldwork with the Chukchi and Siberian Yupik peoples of the western side of the Bering Strait. He was accompanied on the expedition by his wife Sofia Bogoraz, who acted as photographer.

=== Dina Brodsky ===
Dina Brodsky (aka Jochelson-Brodskaya) was a trained medical scholar. She compiled an ethnography and photographic record of Koryak and Itelmen communities (with husband Waldemar Jochelson). She took the majority of the expedition's 1,200 pictures. Her work was unpaid. Her 900 anthropological measurements contributed to her doctoral dissertation at the University of Zurich and to her writings about the women of northeastern Siberia.

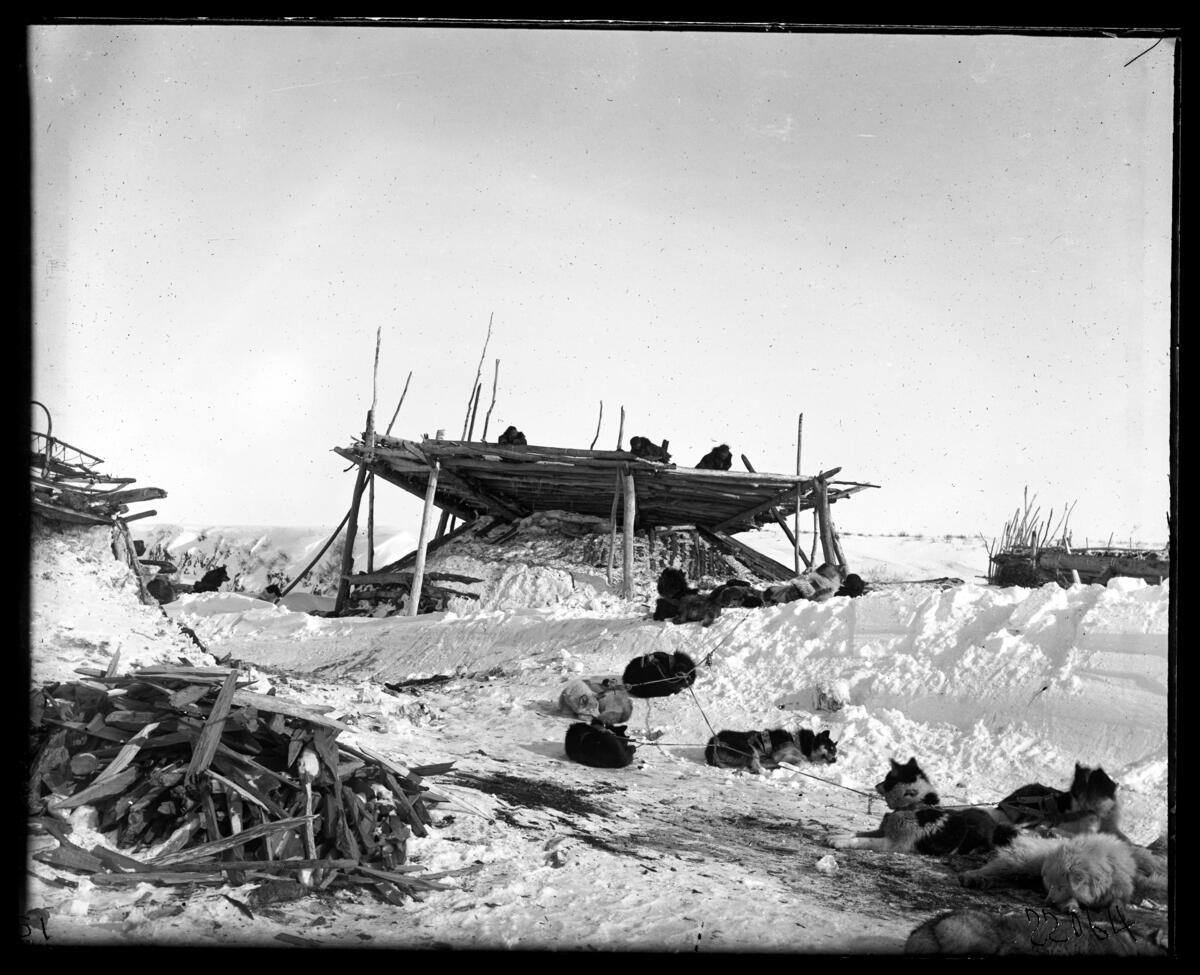
A Koryak house with Kamchatka sled dogs taken by Norman Buxton in 1901.

=== Norman Geer Buxton (1872-1947) American Zoologist ===
Norman was in his mid-twenties when he became a member of the Jesup North Pacific Expedition. His first adventure was in Point Barrow, Alaska (1897–98) where he was tasked with gathering natural history specimens and the procuring of osteological specimens. The next part of his adventure was to northeastern Siberia in 1900. For two years Norman lived in this remote region that is notorious for the length and severity of its almost snowless winters.

Mr. Buxton and his assistant Aleksandr Akselrod collected mainly in the area of Gichiga in northeastern Siberia, on the west coast of the Okhotsk Sea, and also at Marcova, on the middle Anadyr River, 6oo miles north of Gichiga. Buxton partnered with Vladimir Bogoras and Vladimir Jochelson in his collecting efforts.

It was recommended that Jochelson and Bogoraz were the men best fitted to contribute to the Jesup Expedition's success by their knowledge of the country and of the native languages.

Zoologist Norman Buxton was from Johnstown, Ohio and worked on the Bogoras and Jochelson's teams.

=== Vladimir Jochelson ===
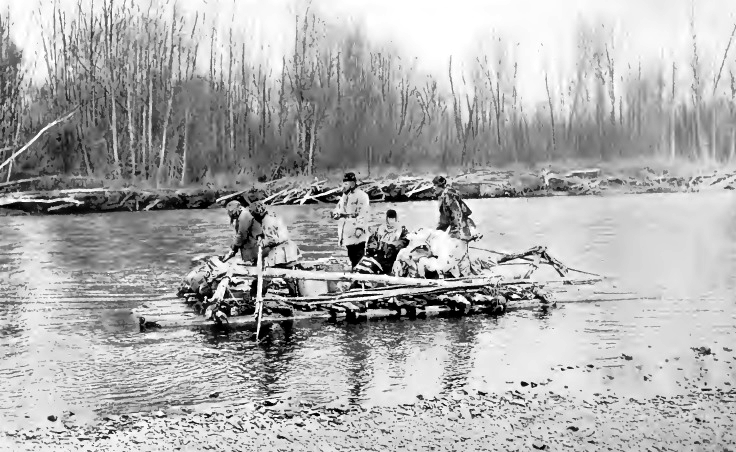
Russian ethnographer Vladimir Jochelson (1855 - 1937) on a raft in the Korkodon River during the Jesup North Pacific Expedition.

Vladimir Jochelson (with wife Dina Jochelson-Brodskaya)

=== Gerard Fowke ===
Gerard Fowke was an archeologist.

=== Berthold Laufer ===
Berthold Laufer was an ethnologist. He worked on the Amur River and Sakhalin Island during 16 months over 1898–1899. He studied the Nivkhi, Evenk and Ainu, and published a monograph in the expedition series, The decorative art of the Amur tribes.

== Fieldworkers in Canada and the United States ==
=== Livingston Farrand ===
While Livingston Farrand was working as an adjunct professor of psychology at Columbia University, he met Franz Boas and became interested in the subject of anthropology. Farrand would go on to accompany Boas on a number of expeditions to the Pacific Northwest, most notably the Jesup North Pacific Expedition, where he studied groups in British Columbia.

=== George Hunt ===
George Hunt; much info at recorded Kwakiutl texts

=== Harlan I. Smith ===
Smith involved himself in archaeological work, and began by digging in the Thompson River district of British Columbia in 1897. In successive years, he worked a little farther east, and also around Puget Sound, and down the west coast of the state of Washington. The interest was in the people who inhabited these regions in prehistoric times. One small section east of the city of Vancouver was found to reveal traces of a people with a much more highly developed technology than others of the region. Some of the regions explored revealed the remains of coast tribes, others of interior tribes. At some points these characteristics merged, producing a different type.

New discoveries of one season explained things not understood in previous explorations, so to gather up missing links and further elucidate the whole region, especially the people of the small section near Vancouver, it was necessary to take up some new territory and thoroughly explore it. Smith, therefore, went into the Yakima River Valley in northern Washington in 1903. On the map, this section does not look far from the Thompson River district in British Columbia, but Smith found not only their culture, but their skulls were different.

These ancient tribes seemed to have lived, each in its nook of coast or river valley, for unnumbered ages, never going to see what was on the other side of the mountain, each developing its own morsel of civilization in its own way, its life and culture and development modified by the portion of the earth's surface where it sat down, seemingly to stay forever. Shell heaps were found miles in length, with tree stumps six feet in diameter standing on nine feet of layers, of which each layer was only an inch or two in thickness. It took a good many generations to pile up those successive layers with discards from shellfish dinners. A stump of Douglas fir, over six feet in diameter, stood on a shell heap eight feet below the surface which contained human remains. The tree indicated the top layers of the shell heap were more than 500 years old.

The material brought back included carved and sculptured pipes, stone mortars, pestles, and sinkers, bone implements used on spears, deer antlers used as handles, stone adzes differing from those found anywhere else, bone needles, shell ornaments, and the like. In addition, many paintings and sculptures on rock walls were photographed.

=== John Swanton ===
John Swanton

=== James Teit ===
James Teit see: and

=== Bruno Oetteking ===
Bruno Oetteking
