= Tenevil =

Chukchi orthographic pioneer

Illustration depicting one of the tablets showing writing by Tenevil, with a corresponding key for some of the graphemes.

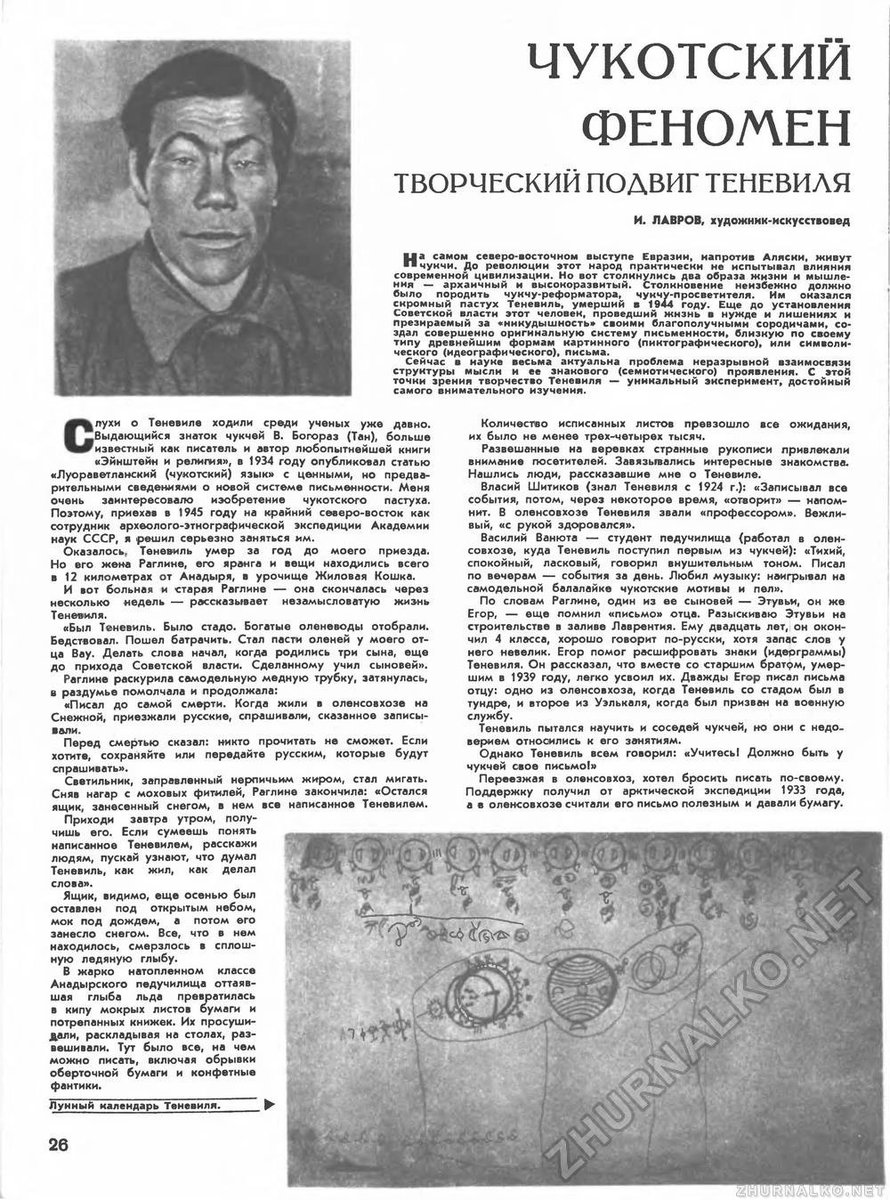
A newspaper article of Tenevil including a portrait of what he looked like in the top left corner.

Tenevil (Russian: Теневиль; c. 1892 – 1937/1944) was a Chukchi orthographic pioneer and reindeer herder. He is best known for creating the Tenevil Script, an independently formulated original script for the Chukchi language.

== Life ==
Tenevil was born around 1892. Johannes Friedrich wrote that he was born near the settlement of Kolyuchino in the Russian imperial province of Priamurye, present day Chukotka Autonomous Okrug. Though this is likely a misunderstanding of Tenevil's autobiography, where he details he was born in "Ku(u)lyuchyn", which is the Chukchi name for Ust-Belaya. Both of Tenevil's parents died while he was still young.

He initially worked as an independent reindeer herder, before losing his herd. He then began herding reindeer for a man named Vau. It was during this time that Tenevil met and married Raulina, Vau's daughter, with whom he had four children, all born in the late 1920s. Through this period the family often contended with a lack of food. In the early 1930s Tenevil met A. M. Mindalevich who was on an expedition from the Arctic and Antarctic Research Institute, alongside Russians setting up a collectivized farm. He was offered official employment on behalf of the Soviet government, becoming a senior foreman for reindeer herding at the Ust-Belaya Collectivized Farm.

According to Zvi Rudy and Mikhail Sergeev, Tenevil died in 1937, while I. P. Lavrov reports that he had died the year before Lavrov visited the region in 1945.

== Writing system ==
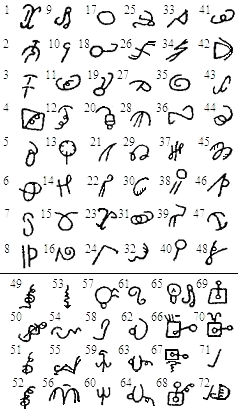
72 of the graphemes created by Tenevil

Around 1920, Tenevil independently invented a writing system for the Chukchi language. He greatly expanded his corpus from the early 1930s with the provision of writing materials from colleagues at the Ust-Belaya Collectivized Farm. The nature of this script remains a topic of debate among scholars. While early research described some of the graphemes as having a "pictographic character", later research argues that the system is fundamentally logographic. Though researchers agree that the system was non-phonetic. Researchers have noted the abstract character of the symbols, which may be indirect evidence that this writing system was entirely Tenevil's invention.

Tenevil also developed symbols for numerals, using the base 20 counting system of the Chukchi language. Tenevil created over 1,000 graphemes. What made Tenevil's system unique compared to other pictographic systems that had been recorded from other Siberian peoples, is that the graphemes did not just correspond to numbers and nouns, but also included verbs, adverbs, prepositions, and conjunctions. (Note: Other pictographic systems had been recorded being used by the Yukaghir, Nivkh, and Koryaks.)

The graphemes for similar ideas used the same root structure, such as "herd" and "deer", with special graphemes created for each person in Tenevil's life. Johannes Friedrich noted that graphemes for words and ideas that were in common use by Tenevil and the Chukchi were more abstract, whereas graphemes for less common words, often for items from the Russians, retained a stronger pictographic nature.

The writing system was used and known only within Tenevil's family, among his colleagues at Ust-Belaya, and his extended family. With the corpus from Tenevil and his sons, who also worked on the collectivized farm, are the diary of work undertaken by Tenevil at the farm, records to be reported to Soviet authorities, messages exchanged between Tenevil and his sons during shifts away at the reindeer pastures, and an autobiography of Tenevil's life. Tenevil developed his script extensively, writing his symbols on boards, bones, walrus tusks, and candy wrappers. The majority of the tablets that were left by Tenevil were read from left to right, though examples also read from right to left. The direction of the sentence was indicated by arrows.

The sources and prototype of the Tenevil writing system are unknown. Taking into consideration the isolation of Chukotka from the regional centres of civilization, it could be considered a localized creative initiative of a lone person. It is possible the writing system is influenced by the decorations on shamans' drums. The word writing (kelikel) in the Chukchi language has Tungusic parallels.

== Academic study ==
The tablets containing Tenevil's script were brought back to the Arctic and Antarctic Research Institute from an expedition led by A. M. Mindalevich from 1931 to 1932. The writing system was then first described by the Russian ethnographer and writer Vladimir Bogoraz in 1931, who deciphered multiple tablets of the graphemes with explanations. The decipherment and description in Russia were then completed by Bogoraz's student Dolma Tsibektarova, a Buryat woman who had studied Chukchi and was studying linguistics. 14 tablets are now housed at the Arctic and Antarctic Research Institute. In 1945, the artist and art historian I. P. Lavrov visited the upper reaches of the Anadyr River where Tenevil had lived as part of an archaeological and ethnographic expedition. There he tracked down Tenevil's wife Raulina, who had preserved a large archive of his work in the form of a box containing thousands of relics of Tenevil's writing. Lavrov is commonly credited with bringing Tenevil's work to the attention of the wider linguistic community.

Between the work of Mindalevich, Bogoraz, Tsibektarova, and Lavrov, vocabulary for 160 of Tenevil's graphemes have been deciphered.

Tenevil's proposed writing system, while innovative, did not gain widespread acceptance. The lack of adoption can be attributed to local Chukchi efforts to resist Russification, which encompassed both cultural and linguistic aspects. Consequently, those among the Chukchi community who were inclined towards adopting a writing system predominantly chose the Cyrillic script over Tenevil's system.

The emergence of the Tenevil Script is particularly remarkable given the rarity of isolate scripts. Tenevil's accomplishments provided insights to the field of linguistics, shedding light on the possible origins and evolutionary paths of written languages. Moreover, his script stands as the northernmost instance of a language crafting its own orthography, making it a point of interest in linguistic studies.

== Legacy ==
The Chukchi writer Yuri Rytkheu dedicated his 1969 novel A Dream in Polar Fog to Tenevil.

== See also ==
- Sequoyah
- Uyaquq
