= Yuri Rytkheu =

Soviet-era Russian Chukchi writer

- Юрий Сергеевич Рытхэу
- Born: Рытгэв (Rytgėv); 8 March 1930; Uelen, Chukotsky District, Far Eastern Krai, Russian SFSR, Soviet Union
- Died: 14 May 2008 (aged 78); Saint Petersburg, Russia
- Citizenship: Russia
- Education: Leningrad State University
- Writing career
- Period: 1947–2008
- Genre: Prose
- Notable awards: Maxim Gorky RSFSR State Prize; Order of the Red Banner of Labour; Order of Friendship of Peoples; Order of the Badge of Honour; Grinzane Cavour Prize

Yuri Sergeyevich Rytkheu (Russian: Ю́рий Серге́евич Рытхэ́у, IPA: [ˈjʉrʲɪj sʲɪrˈɡʲe(j)ɪvʲɪtɕ rɨtˈxɛʊ]; Chukot: Ю́рий Серге́евич Рытгэ́в; 8 March 1930 – 14 May 2008) was a Chukchi writer, who wrote in both his native Chukchi and in Russian. He is considered to be the father of Chukchi literature.

== Early life ==
Yuri Rytkheu was born 18 March 1930 to a family of trappers and hunters. His birthplace, the village of Uelen, was then in the Chukotsky District, Far Eastern Krai; it is now part of the Chukotka Autonomous Okrug. His grandfather was a shaman.

At birth, he was given the name "Rytgėv", which means "forgotten" in the Chukchi language (from the Chukchi word "рытгэватъё" (rytgėvatʺjo) – "unremembered" or "forgotten"). Since Soviet institutions did not recognize Chukchi names and the Chukchi do not commonly use surnames, in order to obtain his passport he used his first name as his surname and assumed the first name and patronymic of a Russian geologist he knew.

He graduated from the Soviet 7-year school in Uelen. He wanted to continue his education at the Institute of the Peoples of the North, but was not selected to study there, because of his young age. Consequently, he decided to go to Leningrad on his own, to continue his study. This travel was delayed for several years. In order to earn money for this journey, the future writer took odd jobs; for instance, he worked on the seas and on geological expeditions and trapped animals, stevedored at a hydrography base. He moved to Anadyr and enrolled in a vocational school. In 1947 he started writing articles for the Anadyr district-based magazine Soviet Chukotka (Советская Чукотка), which published his first stories and poems. In Anadyr, he met the Leningrad-based scholar Pyotr Skorik, who was leading a linguistic expedition in the area and who was responsible for helping the young writer move to Leningrad.

== Career ==
=== Soviet years ===
From 1949 until 1954 he studied literature at Leningrad State University. He was only slightly older than 20 when his works started appearing in Young Leningrad (Молодой Ленинград), and then later on in other periodicals such as Ogoniok, Young World (Молодой мир), The Far East (Дальний Восток) and Smena (Смена). In 1953, the publishing company Molodaya Gvardiya (Young Guard) published his first collection of stories The People of Our Coast (Люди нашего берега), in Russian. This book was later translated into Chukchi by A. Smolyana (А. Смоляна). While still a student, Rytkheu also translated the works of Pushkin, Tolstoy, Gorky and Tikhon Syomushkin into Chukchi. In 1954, he was accepted into the Union of Soviet Writers.

Upon graduating from Leningrad University, he spent a few years living in Magadan, working as a correspondent for the newspaper Magadanskaya Pravda. After two years in Magadan, a collection short stories Chukotkan Saga (Чукотская сага) was published, and brought the writer recognition from both Soviet and foreign readers.

After Magadan, he moved to Leningrad, where he spent the rest of his life. In 1967, he joined the Communist Party.

=== Post-Soviet career ===
After the collapse of the Soviet Union, his works were no longer published in the new post-Soviet states. Finding himself in a difficult position, he even said that he would emigrate to the United States. However, through Chinghiz Aitmatov, he met with Lucien Leitess, founder of the Swiss publishing company, Unionsverlag, who signed a contract to publish Rytkheu's works in German, and who would go on to become his literary agent. Rytkheu's works were introduced to readers in France, Finland, the Netherlands, Italy, Germany, Spain, Japan, and other countries. The German editions of his books have sold more than 250,000 copies. The situation in Russia, however, was quite the opposite since the time his book Путешествие в молодости (Youthful Travels) was published in 1991. Beginning in 2000, the governor of Chukotka, Roman Abramovich, sponsored the distribution of a small run of Rytkeu's works in Russia, approximately one a year, all of which were issued only in Chukotka. The first of these books was a new work called In the Mirror of Oblivion (В зеркале забвения).

His works have been translated into numerous languages, including several national languages of the former USSR. In addition, the composer Eduard Artemyev set his poems to music in a 1985 vocal-instrumental suite The Warmth of the Earth (Тепло Земли). Only a few of his works have been translated into English, including A Dream in Polar Fog (Russian: Сон в начале тумана), originally published in 1970, which was published by Archipelago Books in 2005. It was also adapted as a film in 1994; directed by Baras Khalzanov.

== Other activities and death ==
He travelled extensively around the world on creative trips and with cultural and goodwill visits. As he spoke fluent English, he was invited to give lectures at American universities. He also worked with UNESCO for a time.

He died in Saint Petersburg on 14 May 2008, after a long battle with myeloma. He is buried in Komorovskoe Cemetery near the grave of his wife.

== Evolution and reception ==
Colin Thubron summarized his career as follows:

For his earlier books, there are those who never forgave him. His slavish pursuit of the Party line and open repudiation of his people's traditions are embarrassingly manifest in works that celebrate the (nonexistent) transformation of his native Chukotka into a Soviet paradigm. ... But by the late 1970s, as the slow literary thaw continued, he started to write differently. Perhaps influenced by the derevenshchiki, the "village writers" who turned for their values to the unspoiled countryside, he began to extol precisely the Chukchi oral culture that he had once repudiated.

== Works in translation ==
All of Rytkheu's works are related in some way to the lives of the Chukchi:

Catalan Transliteration of author's name into Catalan: Iuri S. Ritkheu.

- El darrer xaman txuktxi, (Pagès editors, 2007). ISBN 978-84-9779-449-7

English

- Reborn to a Full Life, (Moscow : Novosti Press Agency Pub. House, 1977).
- From Nomad Tent to University, (Moscow : Novosti Press Agency, 1980).
- Old Memyl Laughs Last: Short Stories, (Moscow: Foreign Languages Pub. House, no date).
- A Dream in Polar Fog, trans. by Ilona Yazhbin Chavasse (New York: Archipelago Books, 2006). ISBN 978-0-9778576-1-6
- The Chukchi Bible, trans. by Ilona Yazhbin Chavasse (New York: Archipelago Books, 2009). ISBN 978-0-9819873-1-6
- When the Whales Leave, trans. by Ilona Yazhbin Chavasse (Minneapolis: Milkweed Editions, 2019). ISBN 978-1-5713113-1-3

French Transliteration of author's name into French: Youri Rytkhèou.

- L'Étrangère aux yeux bleus, (Babel Series, Actes Sud, 2002). Original title in Russian: Anna Odintzowa (Zurich: Unionsverlag, 1998).

German In German, the author's name is transliterated as Juri Rytchëu.

- Der Mondhund ISBN 3-293-00351-6
- Unna ISBN 3-293-20341-8
- Der letzte Schamane ISBN 3-293-20295-0 (The Chukchi Bible)
- Die Reise der Anna Odinzova ISBN 3-293-20230-6
- Traum im Polarnebel (1993) ISBN 3-293-20034-6 (A Dream in Polar Fog)
- Die Suche nach der letzten Zahl ISBN 3-293-20095-8
- Wenn die Wale fortziehen ISBN 3-293-20049-4 (When the Whales Leave)
- Unter dem Sternbild der Trauer ISBN 3-293-20085-0
- Im Spiegel des Vergessens ISBN 3-293-20215-2 (In the Mirror of Oblivion)

Russian

- "В зеркале забвения" ISBN 5-94214-013-8 (In the Mirror of Oblivion)

== When the Whales Leave ==
=== Overview ===
When the Whales Leave was originally published in 1975. It is a short novel which takes as its starting point the Chukchi creation myth, and segues into a generational saga. It also has a similarity—in its reliance upon realism—to the oral storytelling tradition of the Chukchi. In her introduction to When the Whales Leave, Gretel Ehrlich writes of the importance of the whale to the peoples of the northeastern coast of Chukotka, where Yuri Rytkheu was born. The Chukotka ice was lined with whale skeletons, Rytkeu remembered.

=== Plot ===
The novel begins with the first woman, Nau. She lives in harmony with nature, amongst the birds and beasts of her coastal home. She is alone, until one day she spots the giant whale, Reu, swimming in the ocean. She feels an instinctual pull towards him, and begins to awaken to the world around her and, for the first time, feel herself to be separate from it. The whale Reu shape-shifts into the form of a man. Reu and Nau are attracted to one another, and they sleep together. After each time they see one another, Reu turns back into a whale. This continues as the days shorten and the seasons turn towards the winter. Reu tells Nau that he has to leave her each night, because he would have to remain on land forever if he did not return to the ocean before the sun set. On the day that the winter’s ice has almost reached the shore, Reu returns to the land—this time, for good. He picks life with Nau over life as a whale with his brothers and father. Reu and Nau set about building a shelter and gathering provisions for the winter. Nau is pregnant; soon after the ice breaks in the lagoon, she goes to the water and gives birth to whale calves.

Reu and Nau raise their children, and Nau hopes all the while that they will eventually become people, like their father did. Reu makes a boat out of walrus skins, and the couple take to the sea. Reu sees his whale brothers, and tells Nau of something his mother told him—that all the people who live by the sea are descended from whales who became human after falling in love with humans. Reu and Nau release their now-grown whale children to the care of Reu’s whale family. Soon after, Nau gives birth to twin boys. The couple continues to have children, and their village—the Shingled Spit—grows. Reu becomes an old man, and dies, happy with the human life he has led with Nau, and ready to go to the world beyond the clouds. Nau grieves as her sons send their father back through the winter ice, into the sea.

In the second part of the novel, Nau lives on as an incredibly old woman; she dispenses wisdom to the settlement’s inhabitants, who do not take seriously her claims about humanity being descended from whales. In particular, she tells Enu, a young wise man of the Shingled Spit, that there are no gods—that humans made them up purely out of fear of the unknown. She argues it is better to do as she and Reu did, and exercise reason to understand mystery. The great mystery which they had attempted to understand was the Great Love which sprang up between them and turned Reu into a man. Enu struggles to accept the literalness of Nau’s claims. Yet he tries out reason, and concludes that his people could follow the sun as the whales do, and live in perpetual warmth. While Enu is distracted by these thoughts, a bull walrus destroys the hunting ship he is captaining. A pod of whales comes to save the men from drowning. Enu creates the Sacred Dance of the Whale, which reaffirms the faith of his people in their whale ancestors. Kliau, who also survived the shipwreck, teaches Nau’s creation myth to his children. He and Enu set off on a voyage in search of the warm lands. They return after many years, telling tales of volcanoes and great forests, and encounters with other coastal peoples, who speak of Nau as their common ancestress.

Givu, Enu’s grandson, whose name means “All-Knowing,” is full of burning questions about the nature of the world. He begins even to have thoughts of killing Nau. He takes a wife, seeking happiness and the Great Love of which Nau speaks in the creation of new life. While walking on the tundra, an all-pervasive voice tells him he has been granted special insight and knowledge. A sickness spreads through the village, and the people turn to Givu for help. He goes out walking, following his instincts, and stumbles upon the rekken, a tiny people, each no bigger than the size of his pinkie. They are the involuntary carriers of the sickness; to save his people, Givu has to help them pass the village by loading them onto his sledge.

In the third part of the novel, Givu is an old man. He does not understand how Nau is seemingly immortal, and he dies wondering about it. His grandson Armagirgin grows up prideful and commanding. He continually challenges Nau’s insistence that their people are descended from whales. Hunting one day, he tortures a seal, skinning it alive. A freak storm rolls in; Nau tells Armagirgin it is because of his actions, and he must change his behavior. He does not, and the villagers begin to follow his example. They fall on hard times, and Armagirgin leads the humans in hunting and killing a young whale. Nau immediately dies. When the villagers return to butcher the whale in the morning, however, there is no sign of the carcass; in its place, a dead man lies on the shore. The narrator concludes that “the whales had gone.”

=== Major characters ===
Nau: the first woman, who experiences “Great Love” with Reu, and becomes the ancestress of the people who populate the Shingled Spit and surrounding region; she later becomes the village’s old wise woman and is seemingly immortal.

Reu: a giant whale who transforms into a man and lives life on land after falling in love with Nau; he fathers the people of the Shingled Spit.

Enu: a young wise man of the Shingled Spit settlement who, after a conversation with Nau, is inspired to sail the world in search of the lands where summer is long.

Kliau: a young man who accompanies Enu on his voyage; they both return very aged.

Givu: the grandson of Enu, whose name means “All-Knowing”; he becomes a respected leader in the village.

Armagirgin: Givu’s arrogant grandson, whose influence on the villagers leads them to turn their backs on their origins, causing the death of Nau and the retreat of the whales.

the rekken: a miniature people who spread disease through human towns as they travel past on their sledges

=== Critical response ===
Gretel Ehrlich writes that When the Whales Leave “is a tribute to the relevance of the old ways that have been trampled and disposed of” and is fundamentally “a cautionary tale.” Lisa Alexia describes When the Whales Leave as a “stunning, elegiacal creation story.” Marina Manoukian writes that Ilona Yazhbin Chavasse’s translation of When the Whales Leave “induces a type of hypnosis that compels the reader to read straight through to the end.” She notes that since the narrative is grounded in the Chukchi oral tradition of storytelling, “the very act of writing it down is a form of translation.” Chavasse notes that the Chukchi creation myth does not show much influence from other cultures, due to how isolated the Chukchi have historically been from the rest of the globe.

Publishers Weekly writes that When the Whales Leave is “lyrical” and “provocative,” and “though the plot and characters can feel underdeveloped, Rytkheu’s folkloric prose and Chavasse’s enchanting translation succeed in reimagining indigenous and biblical tales.” Bathsheba Demuth writes that the novel is “spare, evocative” and marks a change in Rytkheu’s work—a turn “toward Chukchi narrative forms, and away from championing industrialized progress.” She notes that in the original Russian, the section where Armagirgin turns to cruel hunting and breaks the equilibrium of nature is reminiscent of the section in The Brothers Karamazov where Dostoevsky “shows the moral consequences of men acting like gods.” Demuth argues that Rytkheu brings the novel to “a poignant and ethically forceful close.”

=== Style and themes ===
The novel is divided into three parts and spans several generations. It begins in a primeval time when the boundaries between animals and humans were blurred, before humans had come to populate the world. Humans and animals could shape-shift into each other’s form, could marry one another, and generally were not distinct groups. Ehrlich argues that the novel chronicles a further and further distancing from the traditions which enabled Arctic people to live in harmony with nature. Over the generations, she adds, the Chukchi’s loss of contact with their roots produces and enables the murderer of Nau.

Audun Mørch categorizes the novel as part of Soviet Russian literature, given that it was written in Russian, not in the Chukchi language. Additionally, Mørch argues that while the Chukchi culture was the source of Rytkheu’s material, the Russian literary tradition was the necessary medium by which this source material became accessible to the West. Stylistically, the narrative’s Russian literary elements include a focus on the thoughts and personality traits of a distinct main character for each of its sections. Mørch writes that the characters of When the Whales Leave are too simple for the work to be properly described as a “modern novel,” and that “it is tempting to describe the work as an epic rather than a novel.” Overall, in terms of genre and influences, Mørch argues When the Whales Leave is “a rare amalgam of widely different genres: the European novel, biblical texts and the etiological myth of an indigenous people.”

Mørch highlights ecological concerns as a significant theme of the novel. He argues that the novel’s “ecological message is conveyed chronotopically; The way we think and understand time deeply affects the space we live in.” Mørch applies Mikhail Bakhtin’s theory of chronotopes—a term for a work of literature’s “spatio-temporal framework”—to the novel. The chronotopes which Mørch argues are relevant to the novel include: the primordial—the beginning of time—and Armageddon—the end of time.

== The Chukchi Bible ==
=== Overview ===
The Chukchi Bible is divided into two parts: the first is a mythological and historical account of the Chukchi people. It begins with the Chukchi creation myth. The second half of the novel details the life of Mletkin, Rytkheu’s shaman grandfather. The novel records such Chukchi practices as whale hunting, the ritual naming of children, and the ritual suicide of the old.

=== Critical response ===
Colin Thubron writes that Yuri Rytkheu’s final book—in the English translation, The Chukchi Bible—is a return to his roots. Thubron argues that the novel’s “purposeful heart” is its second half, as Rytkheu chronicles the life of his grandfather and the survival of Chukchi culture through the late 19th- and early 20th-century. In covering these years, Thubron argues that the novel incorporates themes of an indigenous culture in conflict with the industrializing West. Thubron adds that “by idealizing the Chukchi, of course, Rytkheu may render them personally colorless”; in particular, “Mletkin himself verges on the Noble Savage.”

Alexander King writes that Rytkheu’s decision to tell the history of Uelen through generations of shamans is reminiscent of Livy’s history of Roman kings. He states that the novel’s translation into English, along with that of A Dream in Polar Fog, “will cement [Rytkheu’s] reputation as a world-class writer.” Emily Klenin writes that The Chukchi Bible “combines legend and historical reality,” as well as “the Russian narrative tradition” with “a less inhibited Chukchi oral tradition of humor.” She argues that The Chukchi Bible does not represent as stark a division between his Soviet work and his post-Soviet work as other critics have written. Klenin states that Rytkheu was concerned with “folkloric and ethnographic” themes for much of his career, including in his pre-Soviet work. She adds that Rytkheu “never showed ethnic chauvinism” and was willing to show the positive and the negative of the Chukchi way of life. Klenin writes in conclusion that The Chukchi Bible is “[Rytkheu’s] best book.”

Lisa Alexia argues that the novel “reflects [Rytkheu’s] later, more nuanced view, of both Soviet and American policy that he developed over a lifetime of travel throughout the world and through multiple eras in time.”

== A Dream in Polar Fog ==
=== Overview ===
A Dream in Polar Fog was originally published in Russian in 1970, and translated into English by Ilona Yazhbin Chavasse in 2005.

=== Plot ===
The story opens in early September 1910. The novel’s protagonist, John MacLennan, is a Canadian sailor who is left stranded in Enmyn, in northeastern Siberia, and taken in by the Chukchi. He tries to free his ship from the ice field trapping them by setting dynamite to it, and loses most of his fingers in the process. Orvo, and two other local Chukchi men, take him by sledge to Anadyr’, but they do not make it there. Instead, the men call for a shaman, Kelena, who has to cut off John’s hands to save him.

John’s ship leaves without him. He moves in with Toko, one of the Chukchi men who saved him. Wearing various attachments on his stumps, John learns to shoot and write again. Toko, Orvo, and the others grow fond of him—they call him “Sson,” which means “dream” in Chukchi. John, in turn, loses his hatred and fear of the Chukchi. John begins to think of remaining with his Chukchi friends in Enmyn permanently. He worries that they will be vulnerable to the white people who seek access to Chukchi territory. He is also increasingly attracted to Pyl’mau, Toko’s wife. Meanwhile, he learns how to write better and to hunt after the Chukchi fashion. While out on one of these trips, Toko falls through ice into the sea. While struggling to carry him back, John accidentally shoots and kills his friend.

Following Chukchi tradition, and his own desire and sense of obligation, John marries Pyl’mau and adopts Toko’s child with her, Yako. He comes to know another white man, Mr. Carpenter, who lives in the Aivanalin settlement. John starts to assimilate into the community. He finds a beached whale carcass, which is a boon for the village. Along with Orvo and Armor’, John decides to buy a whaleboat for the village by selling the whale’s bones. John and Pyl’mau have a daughter, to whom they give a Canadian name and a Chukchi name: Tynevirineu-Mary. When John goes on a trip to Nome to obtain the whaleboat and a motor, Armol’ propositions Pyl’mau, threatening that John might abandon her. But John returns, and brings a gramophone back from Nome, as well.

Increasingly, John is wary of the threat posed by white men to the Chukchi way of life. The whaleboats and hide boats are destroyed by a freak storm. Orvo is convinced it is a judgment from the gods that the village people have begun to live arrogantly. The villagers begin to starve through the hard winter. Tynevirineu-Mary dies of a fever. Members of Stefansson’s Canadian Arctic Expedition visit Enmyn—Captain Bartlett and the Eskimo Kataktovik. This was a real expedition, some of whose members were stranded when the ship Karluk was destroyed by ice. It becomes clear that the Expedition’s goal is to survey the Arctic for the purpose of opening it up to the rest of the world. John and the other men get the motor for the whaleboat working, and Pyl’mau gives birth to a son, Bill-Toko.

John and the other Enmyn men encounter Captain Bartlett again, speak of taking Wrangel Island from Russian, for Canada. At this point, World War I has begun in Europe. The villagers are successful in a walrus hunt. Il’motch, a reindeer herder who has become a friend of John’s, brings his herds closer to the shore. Il’motch tells John that he has seen the bodies of dead Americans nearby on the tundra; John concludes that they are gold prospectors, and is frightened of this encroachment on Chukchi territory. He tells Il’motch not to tell anyone, and warns the people of Enmyn about how poorly the English and French conflicts over the New World have gone for the native people.

Carpenter has also caught wind of the potential for gold mining in the region; John tries to convince him that the Chukchi should be the ones to decide whether or not to pursue gold prospecting, and that they deserve to preserve their way of life. The narrative jumps to 1917; Pyl’mau has given birth to a baby girl, Sophie-Ankanau. John begins to teach spoken and written English to Tiarat, another of the Enmyn hunters, and to Yako, his son.

John and Orvo learn of the revolution taking place in Russia, and the deposition of the tsar. Some time later, Carpenter arrives to inform John that the Bolsheviks have taken control of Russia, and have already made their way to Kamchatka. John senses that Carpenter wants him gone from Chukotka. John’s mother, Mary MacLennan, arrives suddenly, having thought John dead for the past eight years. She is convinced that John is being kept in Enmyn against his will, and insults Pyl’mau and their children. It turns out that Mary showed up in search of her son because Carpenter sent her a letter revealing that John still lived. John is deeply torn; Orvo advises him to return to Canada with his mother, saying that his friends in Enmyn love him and will never forget him. Even when his mother suggests he bring his family along, John refuses to leave Enmyn. She returns to Canada on the White Carolina, and he stays.

=== Critical response ===
Publishers Weekly writes that the novel is “lyrical, instructional” and “reads like an adventure story wrapped around an ethnography.” The review praises Rytkheu’s “clear, compassionate prose.” Kirkus Reviews agrees, writing that the novel is “matter-of-fact, sometimes almost ethnographic.” The review draws a comparison to James Houston’s The White Dawn and V.K. Arseniev’s Dersu the Trapper, and concludes that the novel “merits a place in the small but rich library devoted to the peoples of Siberia and the Arctic.”

Valentina G. Brougher writes that the novel is “an engaging story,” one of the first of Rytkheu’s about the Chukchi. While Brougher takes issue with some of the translated prose, she appreciates “how naturally Rytkheu integrates the customs, traditions, rituals, mythology, and religion beliefs of the Chukchi into the fabric of the story.” Paula Persoleo agrees that while the novel “is a work of fiction. . .it is presented as the ethnography of an ancient people.” She adds that “the story of a white man who sees the beauty of living a life close to nature is not a new one, but the desire John shows for the preservation of the Chukchi way of life is new and personal to Rytkheu,” since “he is a native Chukchi.”

Paul Richardson writes that A Dream in Polar Fog comes from a literary and cinematic tradition in which “an outsider encounters an aboriginal culture and learns what it means to be truly human, scorning the imperialistic culture from which he came.” Richardson argues further, however, that “Rytkheu does not fall into the trap of easy platitudes and sentimentality.” As for comparisons to other literary works, Richardson writes that the novel is at its core “an adventure tale” with much in common with the works of Jack London and Hemingway, and “told in a rich, at times mesmerizing prose.” Similarly, Alexander King argues that the novel is “an adventure story told as reverse anthropology."

King writes as well that Ilona Yazhbin Chavasse’s translation of A Dream in Polar Fog is “beautiful and engaging.” King finds “the plot at times predictable,” but also notes that “there were still some surprises and the characters are well developed, interesting people that you really want to get to know, such as Orvo and Toko.” King points out that Pyl’mau’s name means “Polar Fog,” and that while she is the only fully developed female character, Rytkheu makes her someone we want to know. While Rytkheu is not the first author to write about a white man integrating into a less developed society, King argues that the novel is more subtle than being “colonialist or orientalist”; all characters are presented as complex people.

== Awards and honors ==
- Order of the Badge of Honour (1967)
- Order of Friendship of Peoples (1980)
- Maxim Gorky RSFSR State Prize (1983), for the novel The End of the Permafrost (1977)
- Grinzane Cavour Prize (1983)
- Order of the Red Banner of Labour (1984)
