= Antonina Kymytval =

Chukchi writer (1938–2015)

Antonina Aleksandrovna Kymytval (Russian: Антони́на Алекса́ндровна Кымытва́ль, Chukot: Кымъытвааԓ, romanized: Kym"ytvaal, [qəmːʔətˈwaːɮ]) (April 22, 1938 – October 29, 2015) was a Chukchi poet and children's writer who wrote mainly in her native language and also in Russian.

== Biography ==
Born in the village of Mukhomornoye, Anadyrsky District, Kymytval was the daughter of a reindeer herder, and was called "Rul-tyne" (Chukot: Руль-тынэ, romanized: Rul'-tyne, [ruɮʲ.təˈnɛ]) at birth. Her parents died when she was young, as did her twin brother, after that she was renamed "Kymytval", Chukchi for "worm", in an attempt to ward off evil. She first attended boarding school before entering the Anadyr Pedagogical College in 1958, from which she graduated the following year; at this time she began to write poetry, publishing her first volume, in Chukchi, in Magadan in 1960. This same year she entered the Higher Party School of Khabarovsk, and soon thereafter she became deputy editor of the Sovetskaya Chukotka newspaper. She went to Moscow for further study in 1966 and 1967, and in 1968 published her first volume of verse for children. She continued to write plays and poems for children, developing a relationship with the Magadan Puppet Theater. Kymytval lived in Magadan for many years before her death. Late in life she was incapacitated by a series of strokes; she died in Abinsk, in the home of her daughter.

Kymytval wrote lyric poetry, and concerned herself with descriptions of the landscape in which she lived. Some of her work has been translated into Russian. A member of the Writers' Union since 1962, she received the Order of the Badge of Honor and the Medal "For Labour Valour" in 1988. In 1990 she received an award for her work from the UNESCO International Children's Book Council.
