= Vladimir Jochelson =

Russian ethnographer (1855–1937)

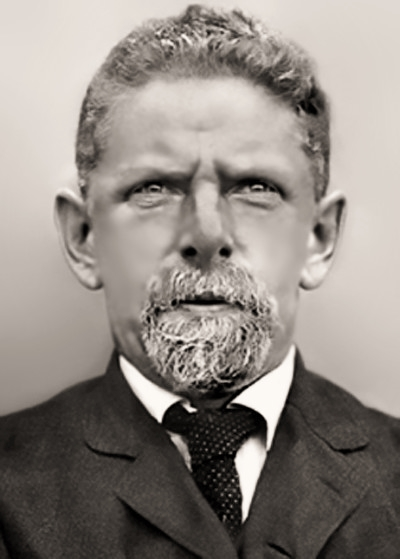
Vladimir Jochelson

Vladimir Ilyich Jochelson (Russian: Владимир Ильич Иохельсон; 26 January [O.S. 14 January] 1855, Vilnius - November 2, 1937, New York City) was a Russian ethnographer and researcher of the indigenous peoples of the Russian North.

== Biography ==
Jochelson came from a wealthy, religious Jewish family. He attended the Vilna Rabbinical Seminary, where he participated in the socialist, revolutionary group Narodnaya Volya. Compelled to leave Russia in 1875, he went first to Berlin and then in 1879 to Switzerland, where he remained four years, studying at Zurich and then teaching at a school on the Lake of Geneva, while keeping in touch with the revolutionary movement as editor of the Vyestnik Narodnoi Voli, which had a clandestine circulation in Russia. On his return to Russia in 1884 he was recognised, arrested and confined for three years in the Petro-Pavlovsk fortress in St. Petersburg, and in 1887 was sentenced by order of the czar to exile for ten years in northern Siberia, in the province of Yakutsk.

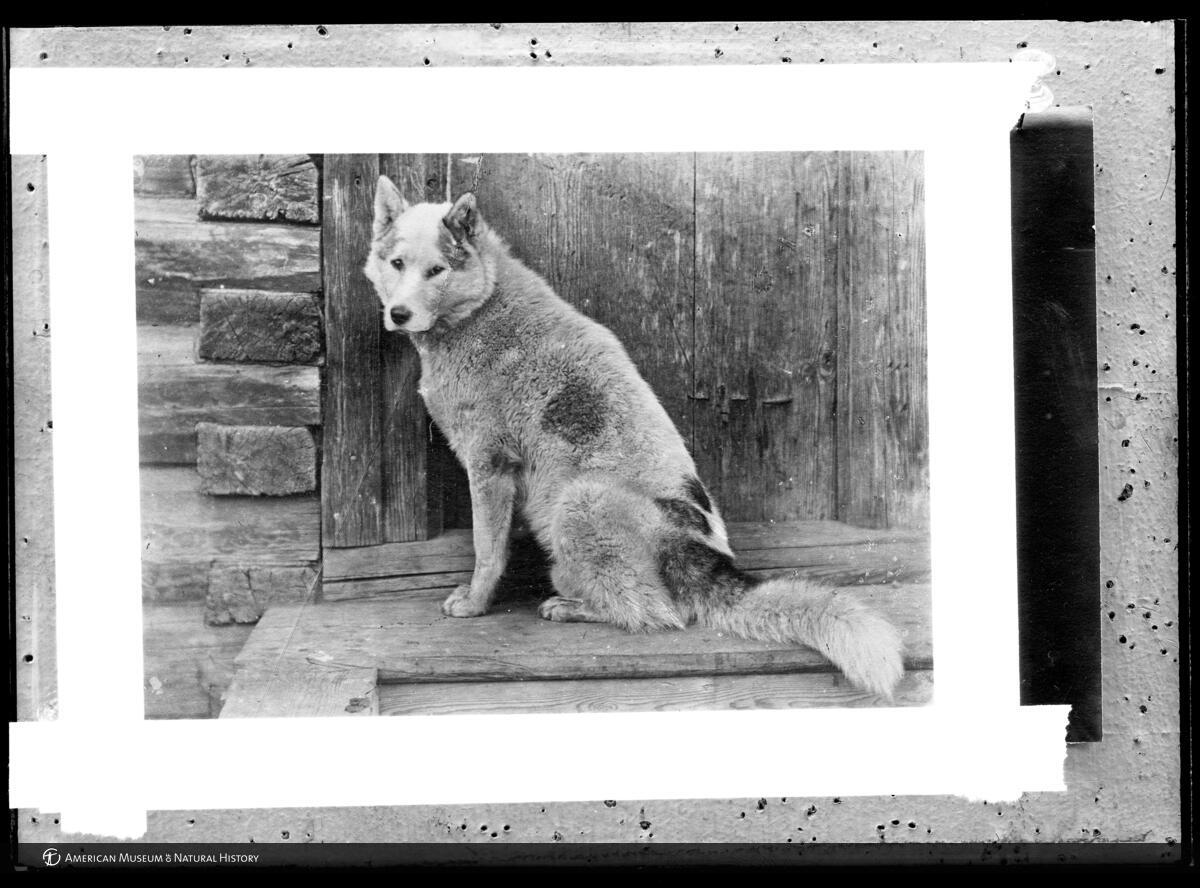
Photograph of a Tungus Laika, taken by Vladimir Jochelson during the Jesup Expedition

In Siberia Jochelson made a special study of the language, manners, and folk-lore of the aboriginal inhabitants, especially that of the Tungus, Yakuts, and the fast-disappearing Yukaghirs. His articles on those subjects began to attract attention, and in 1894 he and a fellow exile, Vladimir Bogoraz ("Tan", also of Jewish descent), were by special permission attached to the first expedition of the Imperial Russian Geographical Society (1894–97), which had been sent to that part of Siberia at the expense of a wealthy Russian promoter of art and science named Sibiryakov. On that expedition Jochelson discovered among the natives in the outlying regions two Yukaghir dialects then considered as extinct. The Imperial Geographical Society published his discoveries in the field of ethnology, while the linguistic reports of his investigation were acquired for publication by the Imperial Academy of Science.

When the Jesup expedition to north Asia was being fitted out by the American Museum of Natural History (New York), the Russian Imperial Academy of Science, in answer to a request, recommended Jochelson and Bogoraz as the men best fitted to contribute to its success by knowledge of the country and of the native languages. For the expedition Jochelson spent two and a half years in the distant north, studying primarily the Koryaks, Yukaghir, and Sakha (Yakut), accompanied by his wife Dina Brodskaya, a qualified doctor, who took care of all the anthropometric and medical work, and most of the photography. The expedition was intended to create a comprehensive record of the peoples being studied, and a very wide range of artefacts and material objects were collected, as well as the final ethnographies and written field-notes of the participants. Jochelson returned with the expedition to the United States, studying there the material which he and his wife, who accompanied him in the last journey, had collected.

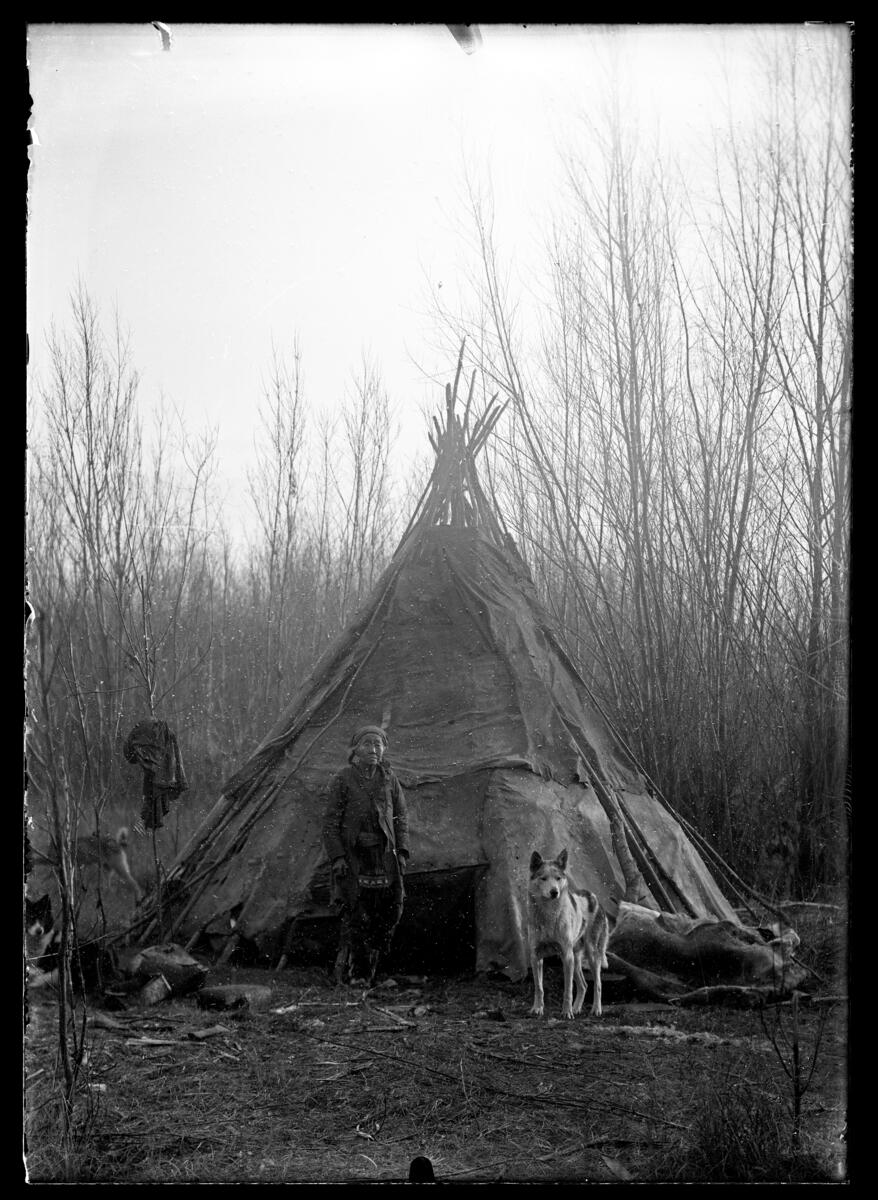
Yukaghir man with his laika taken by Vladimir Jochelson during the Jesup North Pacific Expedition in 1901

In 1909–11 Jochelson led the Riaboushinsky Expedition of the Imperial Russian Geographic Society to Kamchatka and the Aleutian Islands, and then from 1912 to 1922 he was a divisional curator of the Museum of Anthropology and Ethnography of the Russian Academy of Sciences in St. Petersburg, and lectured at the university there. He emigrated to New York in 1922 and spent the rest of his life in the United States, where he renewed his association with the American Museum of Natural History, and later with the Carnegie Institution in Washington, D.C.

Jochelson contributed extensively to scientific journals in Russian, German and English. In English his best-known full works are his volumes The Koryaks (1908) and The Yukaghir and Yukaghirized Tungus (1926) for the Jesup Expedition; his handbook Peoples of Asiatic Russia (1928) for the American Museum of Natural History; and Archeological Investigations in the Aleutian Islands (1925) and Archeological Investigations in Kamchatka (1928), both for the Carnegie Institution. His final work focussed on refining his work on the Aleut language, and preparing a study of the Kamchadal people.

== Americanoid ==
Americanoid refers to an anthropological theory proposed by the Russian ethnographer Vladimir Jochelson. The theory links the natives of America's Northwest Coast region with the natives of northeastern Siberia, on account of ethnographic and cultural similarities. Although there are unexplained cultural, linguistic, and ethnological similarities between these groups, Jochelson's theory is now discounted by most scholars.

The term is also used to refer to a craniometric phenotype present in human remains associated with Ancient North Eurasian ancestry. Kozintsev (2020) argues that the historical Southern Siberian Okunevo population, which derives most of its ancestry from Ancient North Eurasians and their closest relatives, possesses this "Americanoid" craniometric phenotype, which represents the variation of the first humans in Siberia.

== Works ==
- Peoples of Asiatic Russia (1928)
