= Anapel =

Goddess of reincarnation and birth in Koryak religion

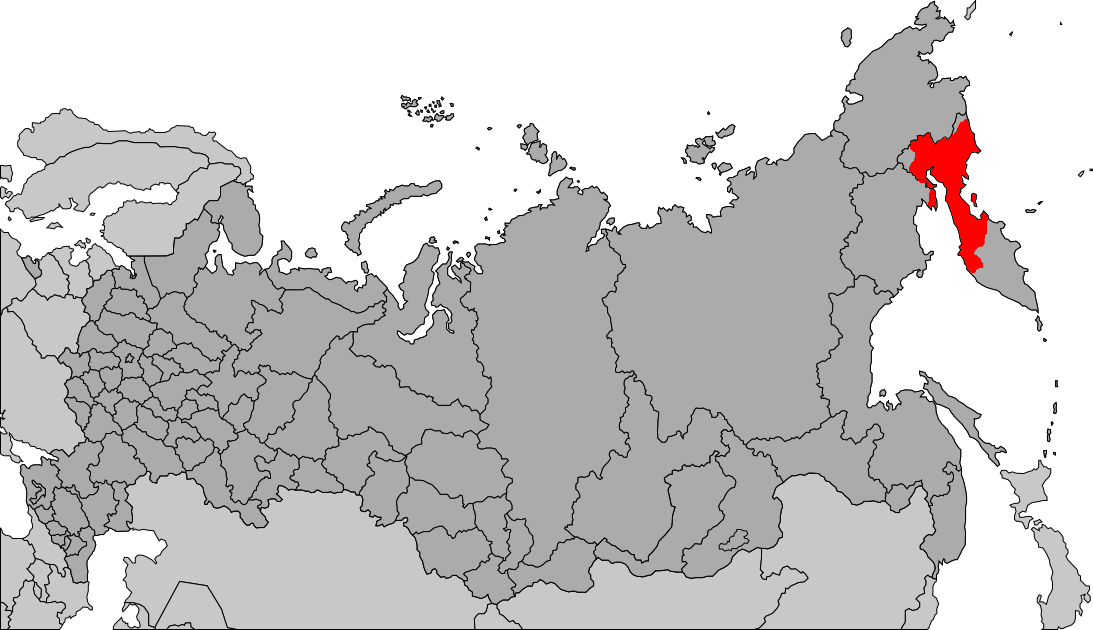
Koryaks in Russian Federation

Anapel is the goddess of reincarnation and birth worshipped by the Koryak people of Siberia. Her name means "Little Grandmother" in the Koryak language. She was worshipped at ceremonies following the birth of a new child.

== Sources ==
- GodFinder.org
- Eastern European goddesses (Archived 2009-10-25)
