= Berthold Laufer =

German American Sinologist (1874–1934)

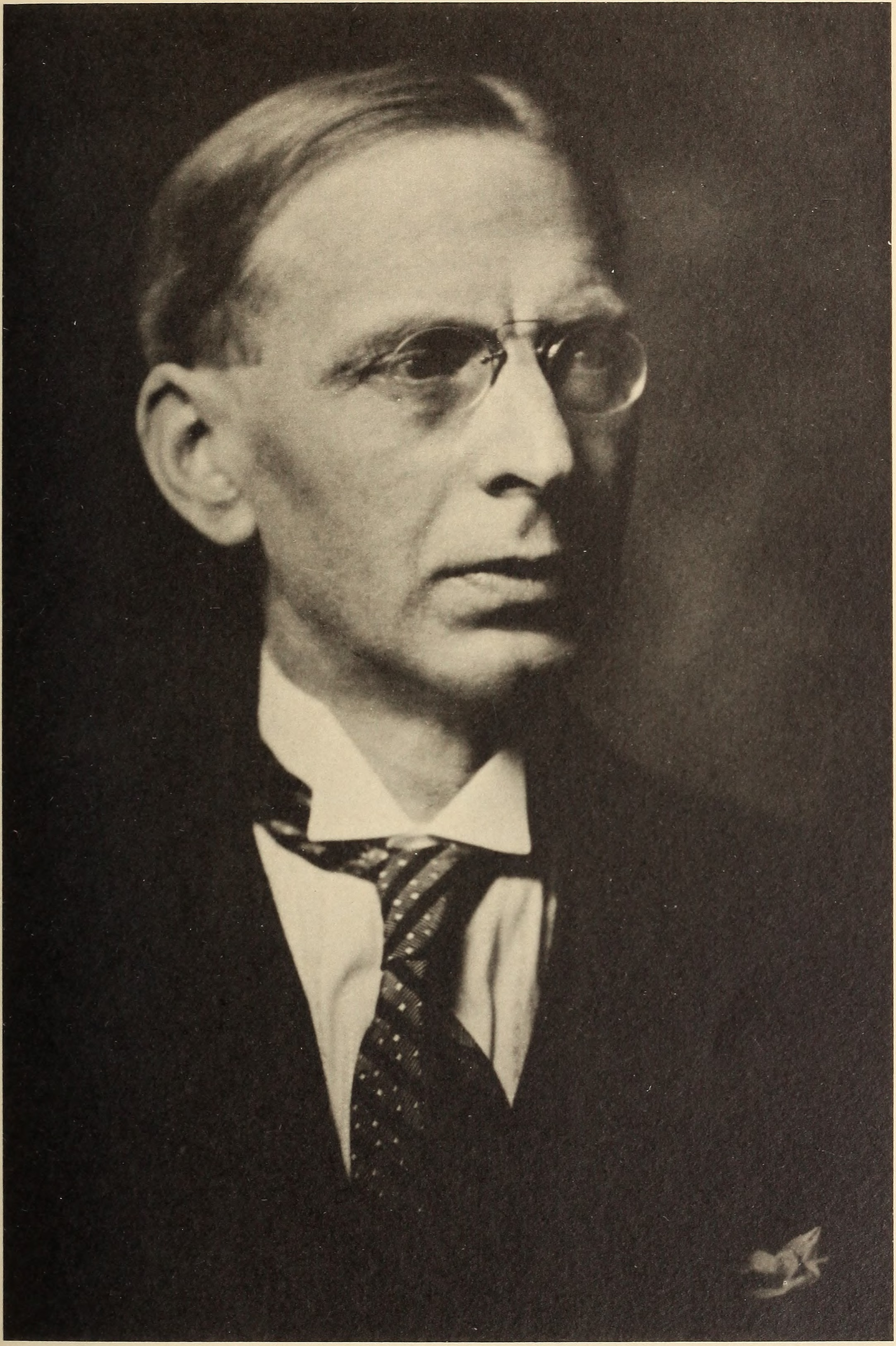
- Born: October 11, 1874; Cologne, German Empire
- Died: September 13, 1934 (aged 59); Chicago, Illinois, U.S.
- Education: University of Leipzig
- Scientific career
- Fields: Anthropology; Sinology
- Workplaces: American Museum of Natural History; Columbia University; Field Museum of Natural History

Berthold Laufer (October 11, 1874 – September 13, 1934) was a German-born Sinologist, anthropologist, and historical geographer who spent his career in the United States. The American Museum of Natural History calls him "one of the most distinguished sinologists of his generation".

== Life ==
Laufer was born in Cologne in Germany to Max and Eugenie Laufer (née Schlesinger). His paternal grandparents Salomon and Johanna Laufer were adherents of the Jewish faith. Laufer had a brother Heinrich (died 10 July 1935) who worked as a physician in Cairo.

Laufer attended the Friedrich Wilhelms Gymnasium from 1884 to 1893. He continued his studies in Berlin (1893–1895), and completed his doctorate in oriental languages at the University of Leipzig in 1897. The following year he emigrated to the United States where he remained until his death. He carried out ethnographic fieldwork on the Amur River and Sakhalin Island during 1898–1899 as part of the Jesup North Pacific Expedition. He was fluent in more than ten non Indo-European languages.

== Scholarly career ==
The Division of Anthropology of the American Museum of Natural History webpage on Laufer China Expedition (1901–1904) states that he:

"led the Jacob H. Schiff expedition to China where he was to make a comprehensive ethnographic collection and to conduct scholarly research on the history and culture of a sophisticated people that had not yet experienced the industrial transformation. Laufer made an extinsive collection of representative objects used in daily life, agriculture, folk religion, medicine, and in the practice of such crafts as printing, bookbinding, carpentry, enamelware, ceramics, and laquerware. He also collected antique bronzes and Han Dynasty ceramics. Laufer's interest in the theater led him to make the most extensive collection of Chinese puppets in North America including shadow puppets, rod puppets, and glove puppets in several regional styles, and to record performances on wax cylinders. The collection also includes costumes, musical instruments, and stilts for the Yang Ko folk drama."

He worked as assistant in Ethnology at the American Museum of Natural History (1904–1906), became a lecturer in Anthropology and East-Asiatic Languages at Columbia University (1905–1907). The rest of his career he spent at the Field Museum in Chicago. In 1930 Laufer was elected to the National Academy of Sciences in recognition of his research. He served as the president of the History of Science Society in 1932.

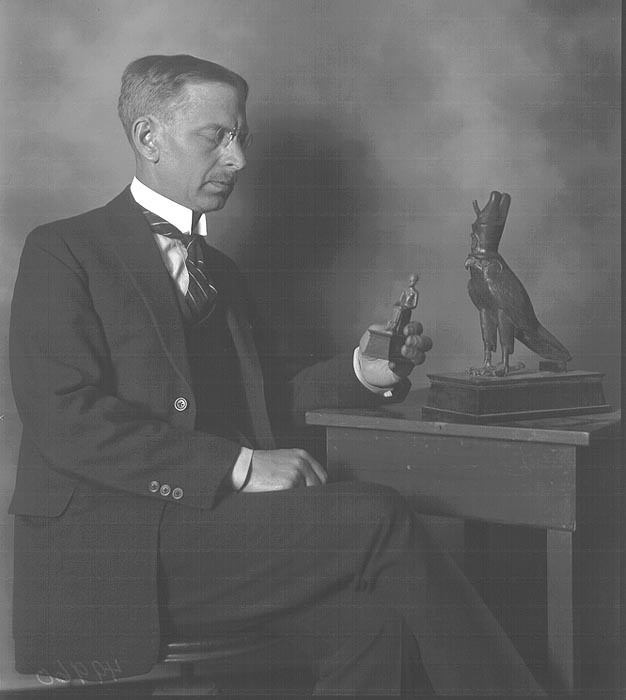
Berthold Laufer seated holding a statue of Imenhotep and a bronze statue of Horus as bird.

Laufer died on September 13, 1934, after falling from the 8th floor fire escape of the Chicago Beach Hotel in Chicago, where he lived. He had been recovering from the removal of a tumor at the time, but his widow claimed he was in good spirits, and the Coroner's jury returned an undetermined verdict. He bequeathed his personal library and correspondence, including more than 7,000 volumes in Chinese, to the Field Museum library.

From "Lasting Impressions: Chinese Rubbings from the Field Museum" Brochure (The Field Museum of Chicago):

When Berthold Laufer came to The Field Museum in 1908, he was one of the few scholars in America who could speak and write the Chinese language fluently. He made the study of the Chinese language and culture his life's work. "I have come to love the land and the people," he once wrote. "I feel myself to be better and healthier as a Chinese than as a European." As Curator of Asian Ethnology in the Department of Anthropology at the Field, he made two major expeditions to China in 1908 and 1923, and his acquisitions form the core of the Museum's Chinese collections.

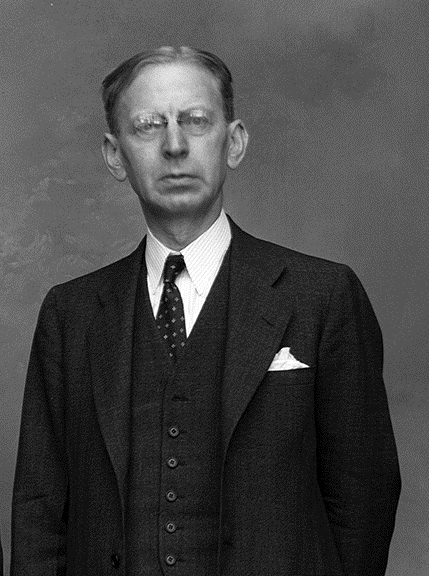
Portrait photograph of Berthold Laufer circa 1933

In addition to his studies in Chinese culture as such, Laufer used his knowledge of ancient Chinese writings to shed light on ancient Iran. Very few writings have survived from ancient Iran. Surviving ancient Chinese writings contain valuable information about ancient Iran, which Laufer was the first to study systematically, and which he published as Sino-Iranica: Chinese contributions to the history of civilization in ancient Iran, with special reference to the history of cultivated plants and products (1919).

In March 2020 the 385 wax cylinders Laufer recorded in Shanghai and Beijing in 1901 and 1902—comprising the earliest sound recordings of Chinese music—were made available to the public by the Indiana University Archives of Traditional Music.^{link}

== List of works ==
=== Written in English ===
- 1899 Ethnological work on the island of Sakhalin
- 1899 Petroglyphs on the Amoor
- 1900 Preliminary notes on explorations among the Amoor tribes
- 1902 The decorative art of the Amur tribes, Volume 7, Part 1
- 1905 Historical jottings on amber in Asia
- 1906 The Bird-Chariot in China and Europe
- 1907 A Plea for the Study of the History of Medicine and Natural Sciences
- 1907 A theory of the origin of Chinese writing
- 1907 Note on the introduction of the groundnut into China
- 1907 The introduction of maize into eastern Asia
- 1907 The relations of the Chinese to the Philippine Islands
- 1907 W. W. Newell and the lyrics of Li-T'ai-Po
- 1908 Origin of Our Dances of Death
- 1908 The Jonah legend in India
- 1909 Chinese Pottery of the Han Dynasty
- 1911 Chinese grave-sculptures of the Han period
- 1911 Jade
- 1911 King Tsing, the Author of the Nestorian Inscription
- 1912 Chinese pottery in the Philippines
- 1911 The Introduction of Vaccination Into the Far East
- 1912 Fish Symbols in China (Illustrated)
- 1912 Foreword to "Catalogue of a selection of art objects from the Freer collection exhibited in the new building of the National museum, April 15 to June 15, 1912"
- 1912 The Chinese Madonna in the Field Museum
- 1913 Descriptive account of the collection of Chinese, Tibetan, Mongol, and Japanese books in the Newberry Library
- 1913 Remarks on "Some aspects of North American Archaeology" by Roland B. Dixon (pp.573-574 of American Anthropologist vol.15 Issue 4
- 1913 Notes on Turquois In The East
- 1913 The Application of the Tibetan Sexagenary Cycle
- 1913 The Chinese Battle of the Fishes (With Illustration)
- 1913 The Praying Mantis in Chinese Folklore (Illustrated)
- 1914 Bird divination among the Tibetans (notes on document Pelliot no 3530, with a study of Tibetan phonology of the ninth century)
- 1914 Chinese clay figures
- 1914 Some Fundamental Ideas of Chinese Culture
- 1915 The diamond
- 1915 The Eskimo Screw as a Culture-Historical Problem
- 1915 The Story of the Pinna and the Syrian Lamb
- 1915 Two Chinese Imperial Jades
- 1916 The Si-hia language: A Study in Indo-Chinese Philology
- 1916 Burkhan
- 1916 Cardan's Suspension in China
- 1916 Loan-words in Tibetan
- 1916 The Nichols Mo-So Manuscript
- 1917 Concerning the History of Finger-Prints
- 1917 Moccasins
- 1917 Origin of the Word Shaman
- 1917 Religious and artistic thought in ancient China
- 1917 The Beginnings of Porcelain in China, 1917
- 1917 The language of the Yüe-chi or Indo-Scythians
- 1917 The reindeer and its domestication
- 1917 The Vigesimal and Decimal Systems in the Ainu Numerals: With Some Remarks on Ainu Phonology
- 1917 Totemic Traces among the Indo-Chinese
- 1918 Origin of Tibetan Writing
- 1918 The Chinese Exhibition
- 1919 Coca and betel-chewing: A query
- 1919 Sino-Iranica; Chinese contributions to the history of civilization in ancient Iran, with special reference to the history of cultivated plants and products
- 1920 Multiple Births among the Chinese
- 1920 The reindeer once more
- 1920 Sex transformation and hermaphrodites in China
- 1922 Archaic Chinese bronzes: of the Shang, Chou and Han periods, in the collections of Mr. Parish-Watson
- 1922 Preface to "Japanese collections : Frank W. Gunsaulus Hall" by Helen C. Gunsaulus
- 1922 The Chinese gateway
- 1923 Use of Human Skulls and bones in Tibet
- 1924 Introduction of tobacco into Europe
- 1924 Tobacco and its use in Asia
- 1925 Chinese Baskets
- 1925 Ivory in China
- 1926 Ostrich egg-shell cups of Mesopotamia and the Ostrich in ancient and modern times
- 1926 Ostrich Egg-Shell Cups from Mesopotamia
- 1927 Agate, archaeology and folklore
- 1927 Insect-Musicians and Cricket Champions of China Djvu
- 1928 The Giraffe in History and Art
- 1928 The prehistory of aviation
- 1928 The prehistory of television
- 1930 A Chinese-Hebrew Manuscript, a new Source for the History of the Chinese Jews
- 1930 Geophagy
- 1930 The early history of felt
- 1930 Tobacco and its use in Africa
- 1931 Columbus and Cathay, and the Meaning of America to the Orientalist
- 1931 Paper and Printing in Ancient China
- 1931 The domestication of the cormorant in China and Japan
- 1931 Tobacco in New Guinea
- 1932 A Defender of the Faith and his Miracles
- 1932 Sino-American Points of Contact
- 1933 East and West
- 1933 Preface to "The races of mankind: an introduction to Chauncey Keep Memorial Hall"
- 1933 The Jehol pagoda model(Field Museum News Vol.4 April 1933 No.4 p.1)
- 1933 Turtle Island
- 1934 Chinese Muhammadan bronzes
- 1934 Etruscans (Field Museum News Vol.5 January 1934 No.1 p.2)
- 1934 Rare Chinese brush-holder (Field Museum News Vol.5 June 1934 No.6 p.4)
- 1934 The Chinese imperial gold collection
- 1934 The Lemon in China and Elsewhere
- 1934 The Noria or Persian Wheel
- 1934 The Swing in China
- 1935 Rye in the Far East and the Asiatic Origin of Our Word Series "Rye"
- 1938 The American plant migration. The potato
- 1939 Christian art in China

=== Written in French ===
- 1905 Anneaux nasaux en Chine
- 1917 La Mandragore
- 1918 Malabathron
- 1922 Sanskrit Karketana

=== Written in German ===
- 1898 Blumen, die unter den Tritten von Menschen hervorsprossen
- 1898 Über eine Gattung mongolischer Volkslieder und ihre Verwandtschaft mit türkischen Liedern
- 1898-1899 Ueber das va zur. Ein Beitrag zur Phonetik der tibetischen Sprache: part 1part 2part 3
- 1908 Skizze der manjurischen Literatur
- 1907 Zur Geschichte der Brille

== Collections ==
- Kleinere Schriften von Berthold Laufer. Hartmut Walravens, editor, Sinologica Coloniensia; Ostasiatische Beiträge der Universität zu Köln, Bde. 2, 7, 13. Franz Steiner, Wiesbaden, 1976-1992 (3 Volumes). A collection of many of his essays and many relevant documents.
- Sino-Tibetan Studies. Hartmut Walravens and Lokesh Chandra, eds., 2 Vols., Rakesh Goel, New Delhi, 1987.

== References and further reading ==
- Hartmut Walraevens, Popular Chinese Music a Century Ago: Berthold Laufer's Legacy, Fontes Artis Musicae, Vol. 47, 2000, p. 345-352.
- Berthold Laufer Papers (2008), Biographical Sketch, Chicago Field Museum
