= Apuka =

The Apuka are one of the nine subdivisions of the Koryaks. In pre-Soviet Russia they were considered to be a distinct people. They speak their own dialect of the Koryak language. They live primarily along the coast of the Bering Sea.

== Sources ==
- Wixman, Ronald. The Peoples of the USSR: An Ethnographic Handbook. (Armonk, New York: M. E. Sharpe, Inc, 1984) p. 12
- Olson, James S., An Ethnohistorical Dictionary of the Russian and Soviet Empires. (Westport: Greenwood Press, 1994) p. 37
