= Vladimir Bogoraz =

Russian writer and anthropologist (1865–1936)

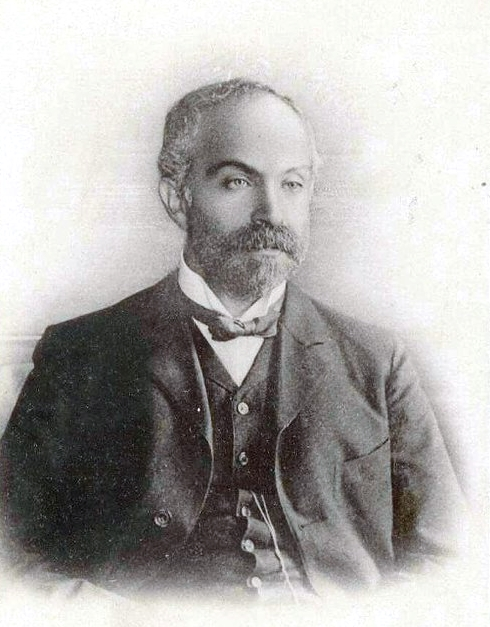
- Vladimir Bogoraz
- Born: 27 (O.S. 15) April 1865; Ovruch, Volhynia Governorate, Russian Empire
- Died: 10 May 1936 (aged 71) aboard a train near Kharkov, Ukrainian SSR, Soviet Union
- Known for: ethnography and ethnology of the Chukchi people
- Scientific career
- Fields: anthropology

Vladimir Germanovich Bogoraz (Russian: Влади́мир Ге́рманович Богора́з), born Natan Mendelevich Bogoraz (Russian: Ната́н Ме́нделевич Богора́з) and used the literary pseudonym N. A. Tan (Russian: Н. А. Тан; 27 April [O.S. 15 April] 1865 – May 10, 1936), was a Russian revolutionary, writer and anthropologist, especially known for his studies of the Chukchi people in Siberia. In English, his name was often rendered as Waldemar Bogoras.

== Biography ==
Bogoraz was born in the city of Ovruch in the family of a Jewish school teacher. Bogoraz changed his birthname from Natan to Vladimir after he converted to Christianity in adulthood. After finishing Chekhov Gymnasium in 1882, he enrolled in the Faculty of Law of Saint Petersburg University, but was dismissed for revolutionary activity with Narodnaya Volya and exiled to his parents' home in Taganrog. He spent 11 months at Taganrog prison for revolutionary propaganda. In 1886, he moved to Saint Petersburg, where he was arrested and later exiled into northeastern Siberia, near Yakutsk (1889–1899), where he studied the Chukchi people, their way of life, traditions, language, and beliefs, giving him valuable material for poems and belletristic essays. Allegedly, Bogoraz attained fluency in the Chukchi language and partial fluency in the Even language.

Bogoraz published his first literary works in the early 1880s, but he became famous by 1896–1897 under the literary pseudonym Tan for poems and novels published in various periodicals. In 1899, he published the book Chukchi Tales and in 1900, Poems. The ethnographical materials he published in periodicals of the Russian Academy of Sciences, such as "Specimens of Materials for Studying Chukchi Language and Folklore" and "Studies of Chukchi Language and Folklore Collected in Kolyma District," were a valuable contribution to the development of linguistics and made the author known around the world. In 1899, by recommendation of the Academy of Sciences, Bogoraz was invited by New York City's American Museum of Natural History for the Jesup North Pacific Expedition (1900–1901) aimed at studying the ethnography, anthropology and archaeology of the Northern coasts of the Pacific Ocean, where Tan-Bogoraz and his friend Vladimir Jochelson were in charge of the Anadyr region of Siberia, gathering materials for ethnographic studies of Chukchi, Koryaks, Lamuts and other indigenous Siberian peoples. He left Russia for political reasons in 1901 and settled in New York City, where he became curator of the American Museum of Natural History and produced his great works The Chukchee (1904–09) and Chukchee Mythology (1910).

Bogoraz returned to Russia in 1904. He helped to organize the First Peasant Congress and the Labour Group in the Duma. In 1910, a collection of his works in ten volumes was published. In 1917, he became professor of ethnology at Petrograd University. Bogoraz, with the help of Lev Sternberg, organized the first Russian ethnography center at the University. During the 1920s and 1930s he did important anthropological work creating and teaching written languages for indigenous Siberian peoples and founded the Institute of the Peoples of the North in Leningrad.

In March 1929, at the Sixth Plenum of the Committee for Assistance to the Peoples of the Northern Regions (the "Committee of the North"), Bogoraz and his fellow "northerners" (ethnographers) were viciously attacked by the "orientalists" (mostly Russian rabfak students, "veterans of many a battle and keen on participating in the nationwide search for class enemies"):

At various meetings, the old revolutionary had been accused of turning the institute into a scientific laboratory; of trying to split the institute and gain personal power; of "populist culture-mongering [as opposed to Marxist socio-economic revolutionism] and of a sentimental approach to the peoples of the north"; of denying the existence of classes among the natives and, "as a result . . ., protecting them from the (supposedly harmful) influence of economic development." At the same time, Bogoraz's students and institute allies Ia. P. Koshkin (Al'kor) and E. A. Kreinovich were exposed as his spineless Communist clones and urged to "publicly and categorically disassociate themselves from [his] anti-Marxist views." More ambitiously, the "orientalists" charged the Committee of the North with not exercising proper political control and publishing "anti-Party and anti-Marxist" materials in their official organ Sovetskii Sever.

But Bogoraz and his allies defended themselves stoutly, and by claiming to adhere to the new political line (defining shamans as priests, applying a strict class analysis to the tribes, and laying the groundwork for collectivization) they managed to keep their positions, though they remained under close scrutiny.

He died of natural causes on May 10, 1936, at the age of 71 and was buried in the Volkovo Cemetery.

== External links and references ==
- Boas, Franz (1937). "Waldemar Bogoras". American Anthropologist. New Series. 39 (2): 314–15. doi:10.1525/aa.1937.39.2.02a00100. ISSN 0002-7294.
- Katharina Gernet: Vladimir Germanovich Bogoraz (1865–1936): A bibliography. (104 p.) (=Mitteilungen des Osteuropa-Instituts München 33). ISBN 3-921396-45-X. (German; cited texts in Russian) This is the most detailed biobibliography of Vladimir G. Bogoraz and his work currently available.
- Merriam-Webster (1995) Merriam-Webster's Biographical Dictionary; 1st edition. Merriam-Webster. 1184p ISBN 0-87779-743-9
- (in Russian) Bogoraz at "The Hall of Fame of Magadan"
