= Creative trip =

A creative trip is a trip whose purpose is to bring an inspiration or information for a creative work.

== Soviet Union ==
In the Soviet Union, creative trips (Russian: tvorcheskaya komandirovka) were a kind of business trips for creative workers (writers, artists, etc.) with expenses paid by Soviet creative unions.
