= Chukchi language =

Chukotko-Kamchatkan language of northeast Russia

Chukchi
- ԓыгъоравэтԓьэн йиԓыйиԓ Ḷyg’orawetḷʹen jiḷyjiḷ
- Pronunciation: [ɬəɣˀorawetɬˀɛn jiɬəjiɬ]
- Native to: Russia
- Region: Chukotka Autonomous Okrug
- Ethnicity: Chukchi
- Native speakers: 2,607, 16.1% of ethnic population (2020 census)
- Language family: Chukotko-Kamchatkan: Chukotkan; Chukchi
- Writing system: Cyrillic script Latin script (obsolete); Tenevil's script (historically)

Language codes
- ISO 639-3: ckt
- Glottolog: chuk1273
- ELP: Chukchi
- Pre-contact distribution of Chukchi (pink) and other Chukotko-Kamchatkan languages

- Chukchi is classified as Definitely Endangered by the UNESCO Atlas of the World's Languages in Danger.

A Chukchi speaker, recorded in Romania

Chukchi (/ˈtʃʊktʃi/ CHUUK-chee), also known as Chukot (from Russian: Чукотский, romanized: Čukotskij), is a Chukotko–Kamchatkan language spoken by the Chukchi people in the easternmost extremity of Siberia, mainly in Chukotka Autonomous Okrug. The language is closely related to Koryak, and is distantly related to Kerek, Alutor, and Itelmen. There are many cultural similarities between the Chukchis and Koryaks, including economies based on reindeer herding. Both peoples refer to themselves by the endonym Luorawetlat (ԓыгъоравэтԓьат [ɬəɣˀoraˈwetɬˀat]), meaning 'the real people'. All of these peoples and other unrelated minorities in and around Kamchatka are known collectively as Kamchadals.

Chukchi and Chukchee are anglicised spellings of the Russian exonym Чукчи Chukchi (singular: Чукча Chukcha). This came into Russian from Čävča, the term used by the Chukchis' Tungusic-speaking neighbours, which is itself a rendering of the Chukchi word чавчыв [ˈtʃawtʃəw], meaning '[a man who is] rich in reindeer [herding]'.

Although Chukchi is taught in 28 elementary schools in the Chukotka Autonomous Region, and there are several hours of daily TV and radio broadcasts in Chukchi, proficiency in and daily usage of the language is declining among native Chukchis. According to the 2020 census, 2,607 of the 16,200 Chukchi people speak Chukchi, and only 1,670 use it in daily life. Most Chukchi now speak Russian (fewer than 100 report not speaking Russian at all). The language is on the list of endangered languages in the UNESCO Red Book.

== People ==
The Chukchi people have a history and culture that is traditionally centered around warfare. The Chukchi prize warriors and the fighting spirit that they embody. This emphasis on conflict can be seen in the interactions between the Chukchi and the Russians, which date back to the middle of the seventeenth century and tell of glorious battles between the two groups. The Chukchi have also been known to battle nearby tribes, particularly the Tánñit, which comprise fellow Siberian peoples known as the Koryaks. However, over the last century, the Chukchi people have engaged in far fewer conflicts and have focused more on trading. Today, the Chukchi economy relies heavily on trade, particularly with Russia.

Besides trading with the Russians, the Chukchi make their living off of herding reindeer and bartering with other tribes. There is also a group of Chukchi that do not herd reindeer and instead live along the coast, trading more with tribes who live along the pacific coast. Some Chukchi people even choose to go back and forth between the two divisions, trading with both. These people tend to control more of the trade and have been called kavrálît 'rangers'.

== Usage ==
Many Chukchis use Chukchi as their primary means of communication—both within the family and while engaged in their traditional pastoral economic activity (e.g. reindeer herding). The language is also used in media (including radio and TV translations) and some business activities. However, Russian is increasingly used as the primary means of business and administrative communication, in addition to behaving as a lingua franca in territories inhabited by non-Chukchis such as Koryaks and Yakuts. Over the past few decades, fewer and fewer Chukchi children have been learning Chukchi as a native language. Almost all Chukchis speak Russian; some have a lesser command than others. The Chukchi language is used as a primary language of instruction in elementary school; the rest of secondary education is done in Russian with Chukchi taught as a subject.

Famous writers in the Chukchi language include Yuri Rytkheu and Antonina Kymytval.

== Phonology ==
=== Consonants ===
Chukchi consonant phonemes
	Bilabial	Alveolar	Retroflex	Palatal	Velar	Uvular	Glottal
Nasal	m	n			ŋ		
Stop	p	t		t͡ʃ	k	q	ʔ
Fricative	β	s			ɣ		
Lateral		ɬ					
Approximant			ɻ	j			

- [ɸ, x, ɻ̊, j̊] are heard as allophones of /β, ɣ, ɻ, j/ after voiceless stops.
- /ɻ/ is mostly heard as an alveolar trill [r] between vowels.
- /s/ is phonetically [s~tʃ] in free variation and only occurs in the male dialect.
- /tʃ/ becomes [s] before /q/ and only occurs in the female dialect.
- /s, tʃ, ɻ/ have different distributions between the male and female dialects.

There are no voiced stops in the language; these are only found in loanwords.

Notably, Chukchi men and women use different pronunciation for the same words. While men pronounce r or rk, women pronounce ts or tsts in the same word.

=== Vowels ===
The vowels are /i/, /u/, /e₁/, /e₂/, /o/, /a/, and /ə/. /e₁/ and /e₂/ are pronounced identically but behave differently in the phonology.

A notable feature of Chukchi is its vowel harmony system largely based on vowel height. /i, u, e₁/ alternate with /e₂, o, a/, respectively. The second group is known as "dominant vowels" and the first group as "recessive vowels"; that is because whenever a "dominant" vowel is present anywhere in a word, all "recessive" vowels in the word change into their "dominant" counterpart. The schwa vowel /ə/ does not alternate but may trigger harmony as if it belonged to the dominant group.

Chukchi phonotactics generally avoid initial and final consonant clusters, and schwa epenthesis is pervasive.

Stress generally falls on the penultimate syllable, stays within the stem, and avoids schwas.

== Orthography ==
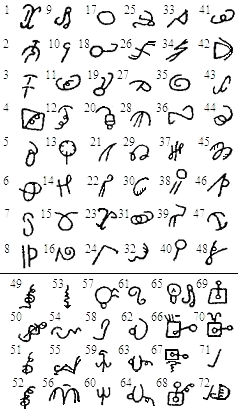
72 of the graphemes created by Chukchi reindeer herder Tenevil in the 1920s

The cover of a Chukchi-language textbook from 1996, illustrating the then-new Cyrillic El with hook. The title reads: Ԯыгъоравэтԯьэн йиԯыйиԯ 'Chukchi language'.

Chukchi is one of few languages to have autonomously produced its own written script, and the northernmost language in the world to have done so. The script was invented by a man named Tenevil, but never saw widespread use.

Until 1931, the Chukchi language had no official orthography, in spite of attempts in the 1800s to write religious texts in it.

At the beginning of the 1900s, Vladimir Bogoraz discovered specimens of pictographic/logographic writing by the Chukchi herdsman Tenevil. Tenevil's writing system was entirely his own invention. It was nearly lost during the initial period of Soviet contact and subsequent Russian Arctic expeditions. The first official Chukchi alphabet was devised by Bogoraz in 1931 and was based on the Latin script:

А а	Ā ā	B b	C c	D d	Е е	Ē ē	Ə ə
Ə̄ ə̄	F f	G g	H h	I i	Ī ī	J j	K k
L l	M m	N n	Ŋ ŋ	O o	Ō ō	P p	Q q
R r	S s	T t	U u	Ū ū	V v	W w	Z z
Ь ь

In 1937, this alphabet, along with all of the other alphabets of the non-Slavic peoples of the USSR, was replaced by a Cyrillic alphabet. At first it was the Russian alphabet with the addition of the digraphs Кʼ кʼ and Нʼ нʼ. In the 1950s the additional letters were replaced by Ӄ ӄ and Ӈ ӈ. These newer letters were mainly used in educational texts, while the press continued to use the older versions. At the end of the 1980s, the letter Ԯ ԯ (Ԓ ԓ) was introduced as a replacement for Л л. This was intended to reduce confusion with the pronunciation of the Russian letter of the same form. The Chukchi alphabet now stands as follows:

А а	Б б	В в	Г г	Д д	Е е	Ё ё	Ж ж
З з	И и	Й й	К к	Ӄ ӄ	Л л	Ԓ ԓ	М м
Н н	Ӈ ӈ	О о	П п	Р р	С с	Т т	У у
Ф ф	Х х	Ц ц	Ч ч	Ш ш	Щ щ	Ъ ъ	Ы ы
Ь ь	Э э	Ю ю	Я я	ʼ

== Grammar ==
Chukchi is a polysynthetic, agglutinative, direct-inverse language with an ergative–absolutive alignment. It also has pervasive incorporation; in particular, the incorporation is productive and often interacts with other linguistic processes. Chukchi allows free incorporation of adjuncts, such as when a noun incorporates its modifier. However, besides the unusual use of adjuncts, Chukchi behaves in a typologically normal manner. The language of Chukchi also uses a specific verb system. The basic locative construction of a sentence in Chukchi contains a single locative verb, unlike many other languages.

In the nominals, there are two numbers and about 13 morphological cases: absolutive, ergative/instrumental, equative (copula), locative, allative, ablative, orientative, inessive, perlative, sublative, comitative, associative, and privative. Nouns are split into three declensions influenced by animacy: the first declension, which contains non-humans, has plural marking only in the absolutive case; the second one, which contains personal names and certain words for mainly older relatives, has obligatory plural marking in all forms; the third one, which contains other humans than those in the second declension, has optional plural marking. These nominal cases are used to identify the number of nouns, as well as their purpose and function in a sentence.

Chukchi verbs distinguish three persons, two numbers, three moods (declarative, imperative and conditional), two voices (active and antipassive) and six tenses: present I (progressive), present II (stative), past I (aorist), past II (perfect), future I (perfective future), future II (imperfective future). Past II is formed with a construction meaning possession (literally "to be with"), similar to the use of "have" in the perfect in English and other Western European languages.

Both subject and direct object are cross-referenced in the verbal chain, and person agreement is very different in intransitive and transitive verbs. Person agreement is expressed with a complex system involving both prefixes and suffixes; despite the agglutinative nature of the language, each individual combination of person, number, tense etc. is expressed in a way that is far from always straightforward. Besides the finite forms, there are also infinitive, supine (purposive), numerous gerund forms, and a present and past participle, and these are all used with auxiliary verbs to produce further analytic constructions.

The word order is rather free, though SOV is basic. The possessor normally precedes the possessed, and postpositions rather than prepositions are used.

Chukchi as a language often proves difficult to categorise. This is primarily due to the fact that it does not always follow a typical linguistic and syntactical pattern. These exceptions allow Chukchi to fit into more than one linguistic type.

Chukchi has periodic tense: it can incorporate the noun nәki- to build a nocturnal verb form.

мын-ныки-урэ-ӄэпл-увичвэн-мык
myn-nyki-urè-ḳèpḷ-uvičvèn-myk
1PL-NOCT-long.time-ball-play-IMP:1PL
‘Let’s spend a lot of time playing ball at night.’ (Skorik 1977: 241)

== Vocabulary ==
A large number of words in the Chukchi language are reduplicated in their singular forms, i.e. э’ръэр 'iceberg' and утуут 'tree'. There is also significant influence from the Russian language, especially in formal vocabulary and modern concepts, i.e. чайпат—from Russian чай 'tea'. The extent to which Chukchi and the Inuit languages borrowed vocabulary between one another, or a relationship between the two, has not been studied in detail.

=== Numbers ===
The numeral system was originally purely vigesimal and went up to 400, but a decimal system was introduced for numerals above 100 via Russian influence. Many of the names of the basic numbers can be traced etymologically to words referring to the human body ('finger', 'hand', etc.) or to arithmetic operations (6 = 1 + 5, etc.).

Number	Cyrillic	Latin	Gloss
1	ыннэн	ynnen	'one'
2	ӈирэӄ	ṇireḳ	'two'
3	ӈыроӄ	ṇyroḳ	'three'
4	ӈыраӄ	ṇyraḳ	'four'
5	мэтԓыӈэн	metḷyṇen	'five'
6	ыннанмытԓыӈэн	ynnanmytḷyṇen	'one-five'
7	ӈэръамытԓыӈэн	ṇer’amytḷyṇen	'two-five'
8	амӈырооткэн, ӈыръомытԓыӈэн	amṇyrootken, ṇyr’omytḷyṇen	'eight, three-five'
9	ӄонъачгынкэн, ӈыръамытԓыӈэн	ḳon’ačgynken, ṇyr’amytḷyṇen	'nine, four-five'
10	мынгыткэн	myngytken	'ten'
11	мынгыткэн ыннэн пароԓ	myngytken ynnen paroḷ	'ten [and] one extra'
12	мынгыткэн ӈиръэ пароԓ	myngytken ṇir’e paroḷ	'ten [and] two extra'
13	мынгыткэн ӈыръо пароԓ	myngytken ṇir’o paroḷ	'ten [and] three extra'
14	мынгыткэн ӈыръа пароԓ	myngytken ṇyr’a paroḷ	'ten [and] four extra'
15	кыԓгынкэн	kyḷgynken	'fifteen'
16	кыԓгынкэн ыннэн пароԓ	kyḷgynken ynnen paroḷ	'fifteen [and] one extra'
17	кыԓгынкэн ӈиръэ пароԓ	kyḷgynken ṇir’e paroḷ	'fifteen [and] two extra'
18	кыԓгынкэн ӈыръо пароԓ	kyḷgynken ṇyr’o paroḷ	'fifteen [and] three extra'
19	кыԓгынкэн ӈыръа пароԓ (15, 4 extra)	kyḷgynken ṇyr’a paroḷ	'fifteen [and] four extra'
20	ӄԓиккин	ḳḷikkin	'twenty'
21	ӄԓиккин ыннэн пароԓ	ḳḷikkin ynnen paroḷ	'twenty [and] one extra'
30	ӄԓиккин мынгыткэн пароԓ	ḳḷikkin myngytken paroḷ	'twenty [and] ten extra'
40	ӈирэӄӄԓиккин	ṇireḳḳḷikkin	'two-twenty'
50	ӈирэӄӄԓиккин мынгыткэн пароԓ	ṇireḳḳḷikkin myngytken paroḷ	'two-twenty [and] ten extra'
60	ӈыроӄӄԓеккэн	ṇyroḳḳḷekken	'three-twenty'
70	ӈыроӄӄԓеккэн мынгыткэн пароԓ	ṇyreḳḳḷekken myngytken paroḷ	'three-twenty [and] ten extra'
80	ӈыраӄӄԓеккэн	ṇyraḳḳḷekken	'four-twenty'
90	ӈыраӄӄԓеккэн мынгыткэн пароԓ	ṇyraḳḳḷekken myngytken paroḷ	'four-twenty [and] ten extra'
100	мытԓыӈӄԓеккэн	mytḷyṇḳḷekken	'hundred'
101	мытԓыӈӄԓеккэн ыннэн пароԓ	mytḷyṇḳḷekken ynnen paroḷ	'hundred [and] one extra'
111	мытԓыӈӄԓеккэн мынгыт ыннэн пароԓ	mytḷyṇḳḷekken myngyt ynnen paroḷ	'hundred' [and] ten-one extra'
200	мынгытӄԓеккэн	myngytḳḷekken	'ten-twenty' (10 × 20)
300	кыԓгынӄԓеккэн	kyḷgynḳḷekken	'fifteen-twenty' (15 × 20)
400	ӄԓиӄӄԓиккин	ḳḷiḳḳḷikkin	'twenty-twenty' (20 × 20)
500	мытԓыӈча мытԓыӈӄԓеккэн пароԓ	mytḷyṇča mytḷyṇḳḷekken paroḷ	400 + 100
600	ыннанмытԓынча мытԓыӈӄԓеккэн пароԓ	ynnanmytḷynča mytḷyṇḳḷekken paroḷ	400 + 200
700	ӄԓиӄӄԓиккин кыԓгынӄԓеккэн пароԓ	ḳḷiḳḳḷikkin kyḷgynḳḷekken paroḷ	400 + 300
800	ӈирэче ӄԓиӄӄԓиккин	ṇireče ḳḷiḳḳḷikkin	2 × 400
900	ӈирэче ӄԓиӄӄԓиккин мынгытӄԓеккэн пароԓ	ṇireče ḳḷiḳḳḷikkin mytḷyṇḳḳekken paroḷ	(2 × 400) + 100

Ordinary numbers are formed with the suffix -ӄeв (after close vowels) or -ӄaв (after open vowels).

== External influence ==
The external influences of Chukchi have not been well-studied. In particular, the degree of contacts between the Chukchi and Eskimo languages remains an open question. Research into this area is problematic in part because of the lack of written evidence. (Cf. de Reuse in the Bibliography.) Contact influence of Russian, which is increasing, consists of word borrowing and pressure on surface syntax; the latter is primarily seen in written communication (translated texts) and is not apparent in day-to-day speech.

== Bibliography ==
- Alevtina N. Zhukova, Tokusu Kurebito,"A Basic Topical Dictionary of the Koryak-Chukchi Languages (Asian and African Lexicon Series, 46)", ILCAA, Tokyo Univ. of Foreign Studies (2004), ISBN 978-4872978964
- Bogoras, W (1901). "The Chukchi of Northeastern Asia". American Anthropologist. 3 (1): 80–108. doi:10.1525/aa.1901.3.1.02a00060.
- Bogoras, W., 1922. "Chukchee". In Handbook of American Indian Languages II, ed. F. Boas, Washington, D.C.
- Comrie, B., 1981. The Languages of the Soviet Union, Cambridge: Cambridge University Press (Cambridge Language Surveys). ISBN 0-521-23230-9 (hardcover) and ISBN 0-521-29877-6 (paperback)
- De Reuse, Willem Joseph, 1994. Siberian Yupik Eskimo: The Language and Its Contacts with Chukchi, Univ. of Utah Press, ISBN 0-87480-397-7
- Dunn, Michael John (1999). A Grammar of Chukchi (PhD Thesis). Australian National University.
- Dunn, Michael, 2000. "Chukchi Women's Language: A Historical-Comparative Perspective", Anthropological Linguistics, Vol. 42, No. 3 (Fall, 2000), pp. 305–328
- Kolga, M. (2001). The Red Book of the Peoples of the Russian Empire. Tallinn: NGO Red Book.
- Krause, Scott R. (1980). Topics in Chukchee Phonology and Morphology. Ann Arbor: UMI.
- Nedjalkov, V. P., 1976. "Diathesen und Satzstruktur im Tschuktschischen" [in German]. In: Ronald Lötzsch (ed.), Satzstruktur und Genus verbi (Studia Grammatica 13). Berlin: Akademie-Verlag, pp. 181–211.
- Priest, Lorna A. (2005). "Proposal to Encode Additional Cyrillic Characters" (PDF). Archived from the original (PDF) on 2016-03-10.
- Skorik, P[etr] Ja., 1961. Grammatika čukotskogo jazyka 1: Fonetika i morfologija imennych častej reči (Grammar of the Chukchi Language: Phonetics and morphology of the nominal parts of speech) [in Russian]. Leningrad: Nauka.
- Skorik, P[etr] Ja., 1977. Grammatika čukotskogo jazyka 2: Glagol, narečie, služebnye slova (Grammar of the Chuckchi Language: Verb, adverb, function words) [in Russian]. Leningrad: Nauka:
- Weinstein, Charles, 2010. Parlons tchouktche [in French]. Paris: L'Harmattan. ISBN 978-2-296-10412-9
