= Chukchi people =

Indigenous people in Russia

Chukchi
Chukot: ԓыгъоравэтԓьэт, о'равэтԓьэт Luoravetlan
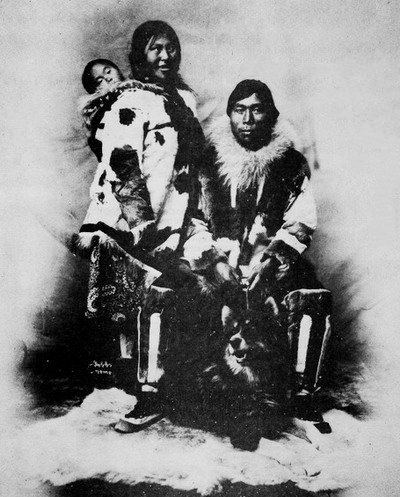
- Chukchi family and their Siberian Husky, early 20th century

Total population
- 16,241

Regions with significant populations
- Russia: 16,200
- Chukotka Autonomous Okrug: 13,292
- Ukraine: 30
- Estonia: 11

Languages
- Russian, Chukchi

Religion
- Shamanism, Russian Orthodoxy

Related ethnic groups
- other Chukotko-Kamchatkan peoples

The Chukchi (also: Chukchee; Chukot: ԓыгъоравэтԓьэт, romanized: ḷygʺoravètḷʹèt or о'равэтԓьэт o'ravètḷʹèt) are a Siberian ethnic group native to the Chukchi Peninsula, the shores of the Chukchi Sea and the Bering Sea region of the Arctic Ocean all within modern Russia. They speak the Chukchi language. The Chukchi originated from the people living around the Okhotsk Sea.

According to several studies on genomic research conducted from 2014 to 2018, the Chukchi are the closest Asian relatives of the Indigenous peoples of the Americas, as such they are descendants of the settlers of Beringia who remained on the Asian side when the sea levels rose.

The majority of Chukchi reside within Chukotka Autonomous Okrug, but some also reside in the neighboring Sakha Republic to the west, Magadan Oblast to the southwest, and Kamchatka Krai to the south. Some Chukchi also reside in other parts of Russia, as well as in Europe and North America. The total number of Chukchi in the world slightly exceeds 16,000.

== Origins ==
The modern ethnogenetic scheme makes it possible to assess the Chukchi as aborigines of continental Chukotka. Their ancestors lived here at the turn of the 4th-3rd millennia BC

== Culture ==
The approximate distribution of Chukchi clans at the end of the 19th century

The Chukchi are traditionally divided into the Maritime Chukchi, who had settled homes on the coast and lived primarily from sea mammal hunting, and the Reindeer Chukchi, who lived as nomads in the inland tundra region, migrating seasonally with their herds of reindeer. The Russian name Чу́кчи Chukchi is derived from the Chukchi word чавчыв (Chukot pronunciation: [ʧawʧəw], "rich in reindeer") as an endonym among the latter to distinguish themselves from the former called анкальын Anqallyt ("the sea people" from анкы anqy "sea"). Both groups together identify under the name of Ӆыгъоравэтԓьан Luoravetlan (Chukot pronunciation: [ɬəɣʔoráwətɬʔǝn], literally 'genuine person') or Оравэтԓьан Oravetlan (plural: оравэтԓьат Oravetlat).

The anthropologist Marshall Sahlins called the Chukchi "tribes without rulers". They often lacked formal political structures, but had a formal cosmic hierarchy.

=== Traditions ===
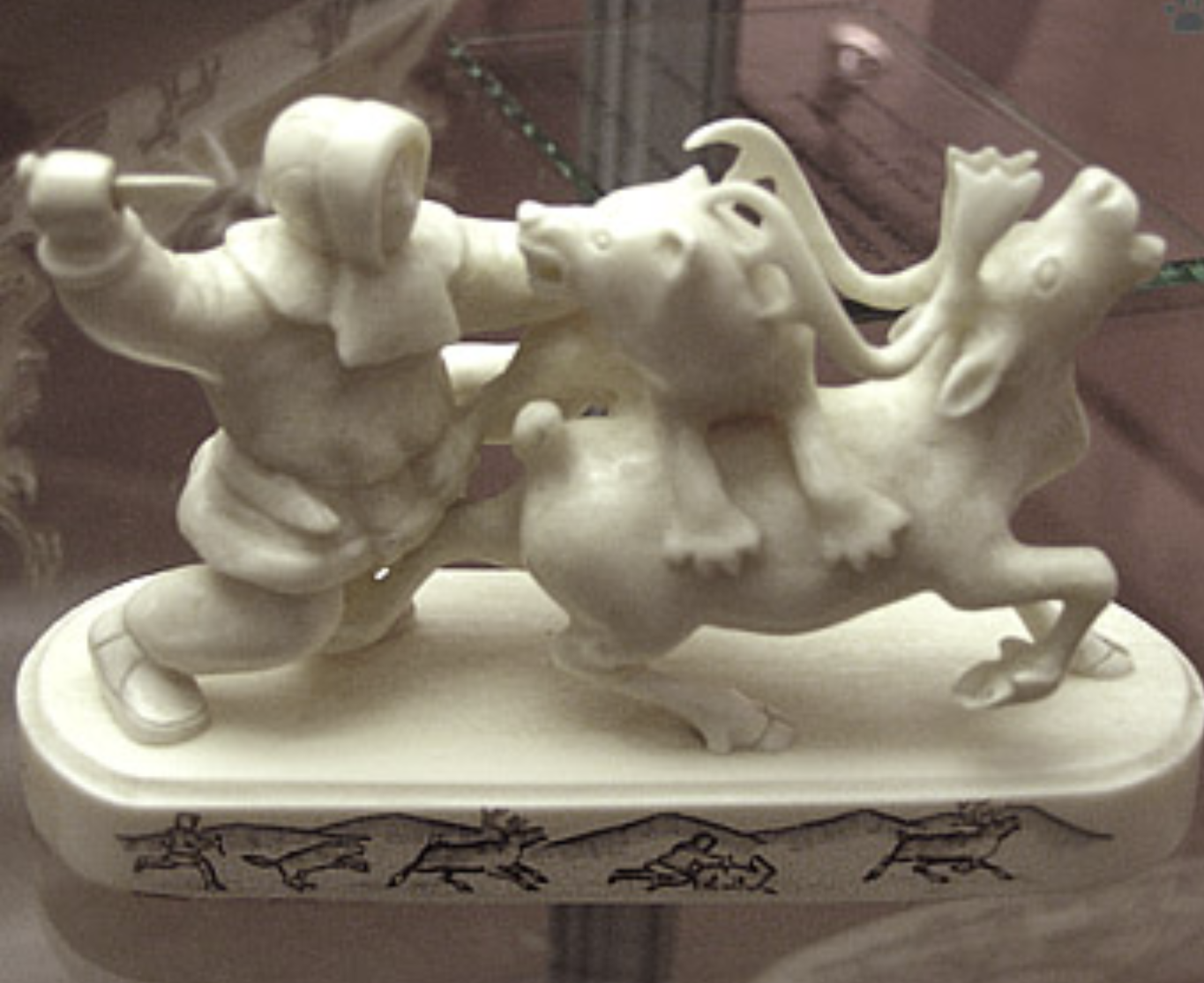
Shepherd defending his reindeer from wolves, contemporary walrus tusk carvings, Anadyr City Museum

One Chukchi form of folk art is sculpture and carving on bones and walrus tusks. Common traditional themes of these arts are landscapes, hunting scenes, and animals. The women are skilled seamstresses. The traditional dress for both genders is made of skins and fur, decorated with beads and embroidery on holidays and special occasions. Men wear loose shirts and trousers made of the same material at important traditional events.

=== Religion ===
In Chukchi religion, every object, whether animate or inanimate, is assigned a spirit. This spirit can be either harmful or benevolent. Some of Chukchi myths reveal a dualistic cosmology. A Chukchi shaman once explained to the ethnographer Vladimir Bogoraz that "The lamp walks around. The walls of the house have voices of their own. ... Even the shadows on the wall constitute definite tribes and have their own country, where they live in huts and subsist by hunting." During Chukchi rituals, shamans fall into trances (sometimes with the aid of hallucinogenic mushrooms), communicate with spirits, allow the spirits to speak through them, predict the future and cast spells.

Early Russian ethnographers observed that Chukchi shamans were said to be called by spirits, dreams, or omens, and were believed to be capable of flight, exorcism, and healing. Some shamans were called by mystical forces to engage in a form of ritualized homosexual relations with other men. This ritual typically involved a gender change through a religious ceremony that, it was believed, transformed his genitalia into that of a female. After the change, he might dress in women's clothing and behave in feminine ways. He was then believed to "lose" masculine traits like hunting skill, and instead take on "feminine" traits, like healing and nurturing. Some of these shamans would take male lovers, and could even marry other men, and the shaman would take on a "wifely" role.

== Subsistence ==
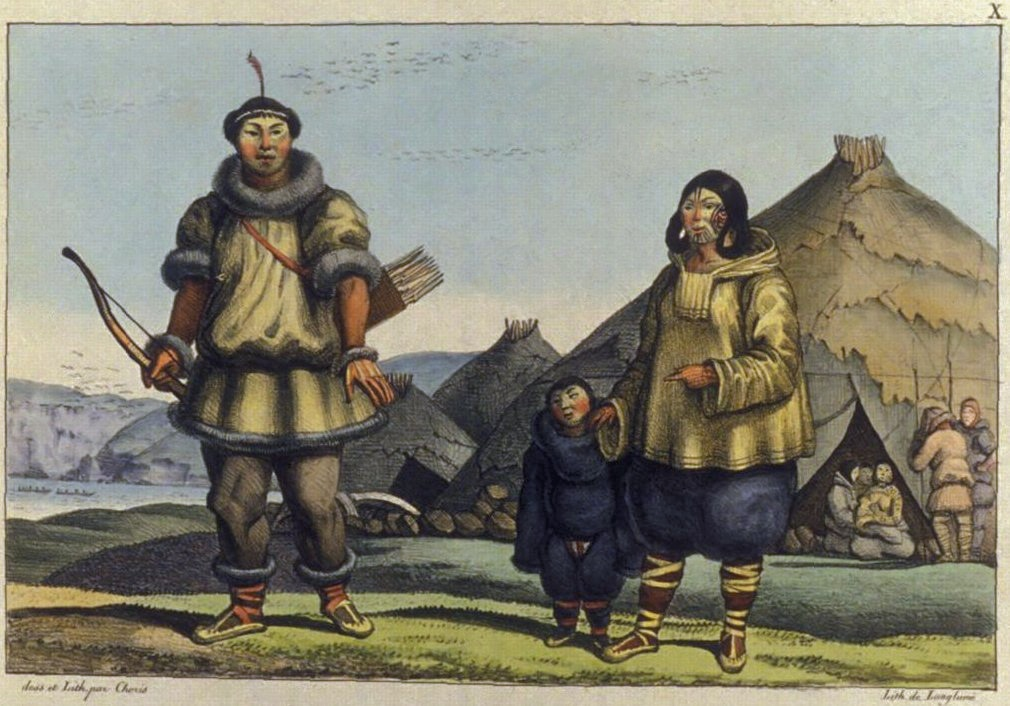
Representation of a Chukchi family by Louis Choris (1816)

In prehistoric times, the Chukchi engaged in nomadic hunter gatherer modes of existence. In current times, there continue to be some elements of subsistence hunting, including that of polar bears, seals, walruses, whales, and reindeer. There are some differences between the traditional lifestyles of the coastal and inland Chukchi. The coastal Chukchi were largely settled fishers and hunters, mainly of sea mammals. The inland Chukchi were partial reindeer herders.

Beginning in the 1920s, the Soviets organized the economic activities of both coastal and inland Chukchi and eventually established 28 collectively run, state-owned enterprises in Chukotka. All of these were based on reindeer herding, with the addition of sea mammal hunting and walrus ivory carving in the coastal areas. Chukchi were educated in Soviet schools and today are almost 100% literate and fluent in the Russian language. Only a portion of them today work directly in reindeer herding or sea mammal hunting, and continue to live a nomadic lifestyle in yaranga tents.

== History and warfare ==
The Chukchi engaged in frequent warfare with neighboring peoples, most notably the Koryaks, as well as with Eskimo communities on both sides of the Bering Strait.

=== Conflicts with Inuit peoples ===
Before sustained Russian and other European contact, the Chukchi, Siberian Yupik, and Alaskan Inupiat maintained long-standing relationships characterized by both trade and armed conflict. Intertribal warfare and cross-strait raiding expeditions were common among the indigenous populations of the region. Anthropological records note that during these ancient conflicts, coastal communities often forged alliances across the strait and constructed fortified settlements on high ground to defend against sudden sea raids.

=== Relations with Russians ===
Newlyweds Meet the Sun. Painting of Chukchi by Nikolai Getman

Russians first began contacting the Chukchi when they reached the Kolyma (1643) and the Anadyr (1649). The route from Nizhnekolymsk to the fort at Anadyrsk along the southwest of the main Chukchi area became a major trade route. The overland journey from Yakutsk to Anadyrsk took about six months.

The Chukchi were generally ignored for the next fifty years because they were warlike and did not provide furs or other valuable commodities to tax. Armed skirmishes flared up around 1700 when the Russians began operating in the Kamchatka Peninsula and needed to protect their communications from the Chukchi and Koryak. The first attempt to conquer them was made in 1701. Other expeditions were sent out in 1708, 1709 and 1711 with considerable bloodshed but little success and unable to eliminate the local population on the large territory. War was renewed in 1729, when the Chukchi defeated an expedition from Okhotsk and killed its commander. Command passed to Major Dmitry Pavlutsky, who adopted very destructive tactics, burning, driving off reindeer, killing men and capturing women and children.

In 1742, the government at Saint Petersburg ordered another war in which the Chukchi and Koryak were to be "totally extirpated". The war (1744–47) was conducted with similar brutality and ended when Pavlutsky was killed in March 1747. It is said that the Chukchi kept his head as a trophy for several years. The Russians waged war again in the 1750s, but some Chukchi did survive these extermination plans in the very far northeast.

In 1762, when Catherine the Great was crowned, Saint Petersburg adopted a different policy. Maintaining the fort at Anadyrsk had cost some 1,380,000 rubles, but the area had returned only 29,150 rubles in taxes, so the government abandoned Anadyrsk in 1764. The Chukchi, no longer attacked by the Russian Empire, began to trade peacefully with the Russians. From 1788, they participated in an annual trade fair on the lower Kolyma. Another was established in 1775 on the Angarka, a tributary of the Bolshoy Anyuy. This trade declined in the late 19th century when American whalers and others began landing goods on the coast.

The first Christian missions from the Eastern Orthodox Church entered Chukchi territory some time after 1815. The strategy worked, and trade flourished between the Cossacks and the Chukchi. As the annual trade fairs where goods were exchanged continued, a common language between the two peoples was spoken. The Native people, however, never paid yasak (a fur tribute), and their status as subjects was little more than a formality. The formal annexation of the Chukotka Peninsula did not happen until much later, during the time of the Soviet Union.

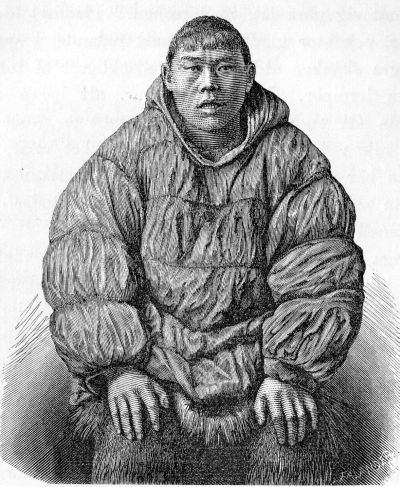
A Chukchi man

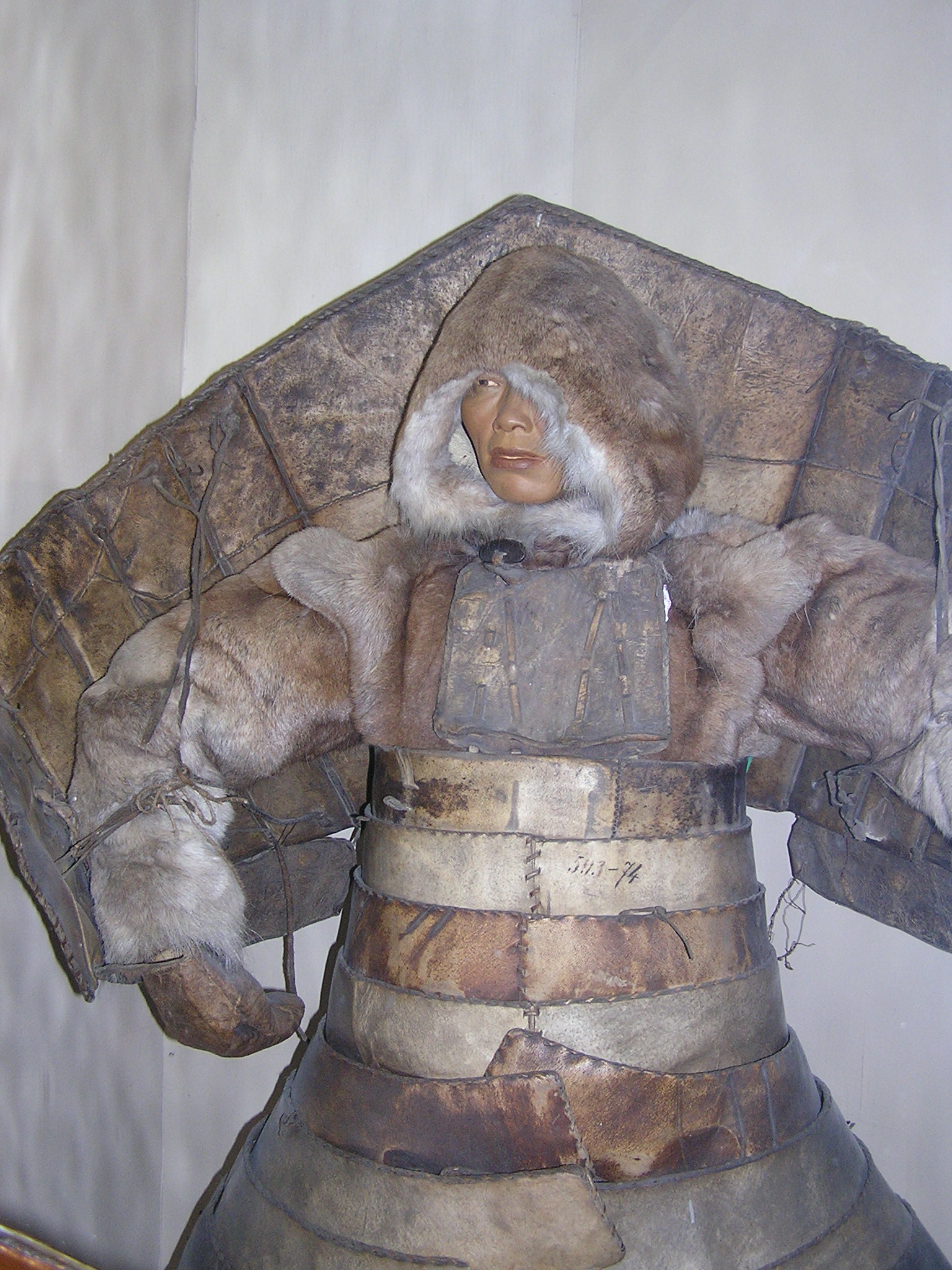
Laminar armor from hardened leather with pauldrons reinforced by wood, worn by Native Siberians

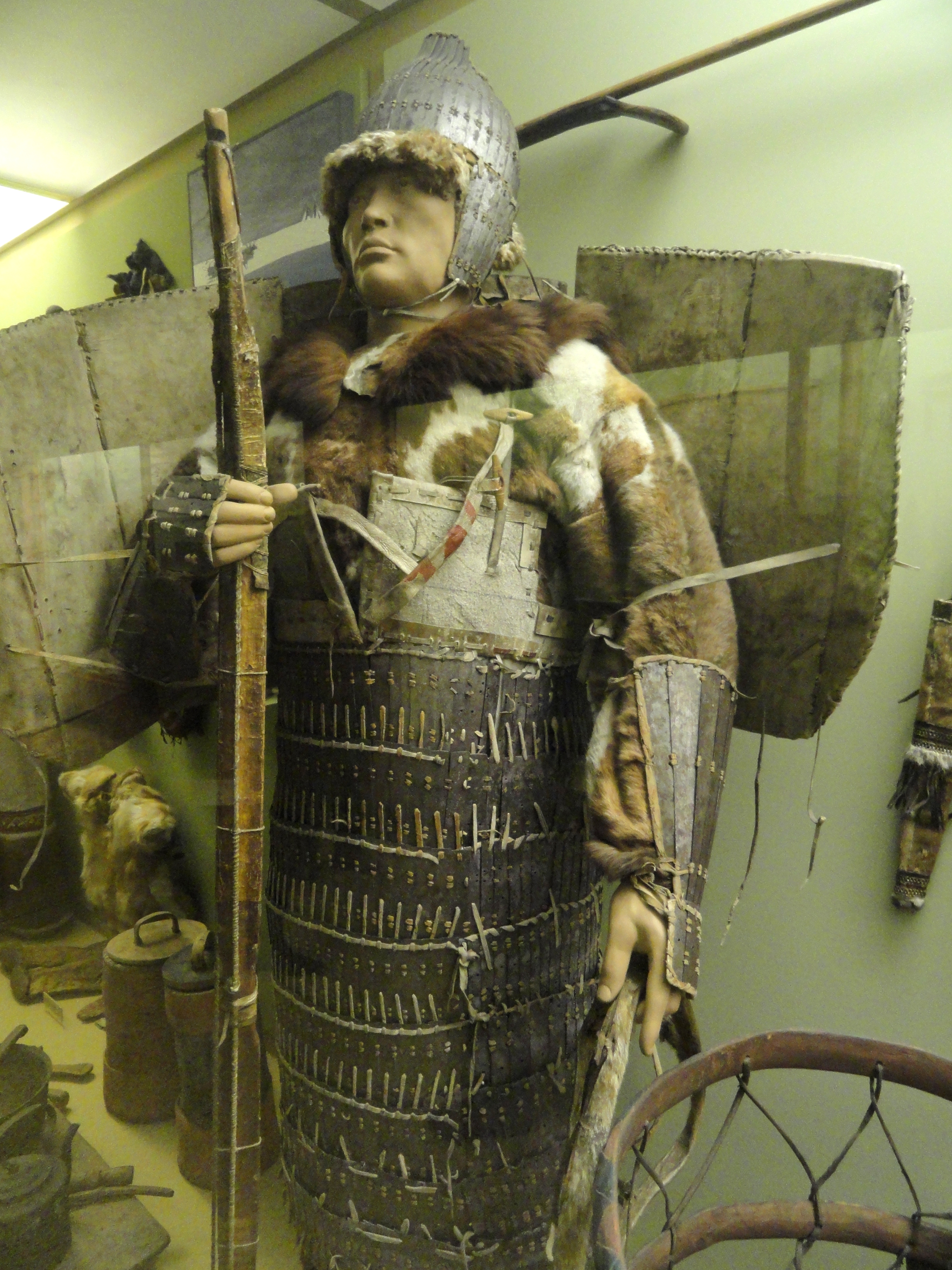
Warrior armor and sinew bow, 19th century

=== Soviet period ===
Resettlement of the Chukchi in the Far Eastern Federal District by urban and rural settlements in%, 2010 census

Apart from four Orthodox schools, there were no schools in the Chukchi land until the late 1920s. In 1926, there were 72 literate Chukchis. The Soviets introduced a Latin alphabet in 1932 to transcribe their language, replacing it with Cyrillic in 1937. In 1934, 71% of the Chukchis were nomadic. In 1941, 90% of the reindeer were still privately owned. So-called kulaks roamed with their private herds up into the 1950s.

Population estimates from Forsyth:

- 1700: 6,000
- 1800: 8,000–9,000
- 1926: 13,100
- 1930s: 12,000
- 1939: 13,900
- 1959: 11,700
- 1979: at least 13,169

Chukchi jokes are a staple of Soviet humor, where they are depicted as primitive, uncivilized, and simple-minded, but clever in their own way.

=== Post-Soviet period ===
After 1990 and the fall of the Soviet Union, there was a major exodus of Russians from the area because of the underfunding of the local industry.

After the collapse of the Soviet Union, the state-run farms were reorganized and nominally privatized. This process was ultimately destructive to the village-based economy in Chukotka. The region has still not fully recovered. Many rural Chukchi, as well as Russians in Chukotka's villages, have survived in recent years only with the help of direct humanitarian aid. Some Chukchi have attained university degrees, becoming poets, writers, politicians, teachers and doctors.

Since the beginning of the Russian invasion of Ukraine in 2022, the Chukchi have been reported to be among Russia's ethnic minority groups experiencing disproportionately high casualty rates among Russian forces.

== See also ==
- Tenevil, a Chukchi orthographic pioneer and reindeer herder
