= Enurmino =

Enurmino Энурмино (Russian) Иннурмин (Chukchi)
- Selo
- Interactive map of Enurmino
- Location of Enurmino Enurmino (Chukotka Autonomous Okrug)
- Coordinates: 66°57′N 171°49′W
- Country: Russia
- Federal subject: Chukotka Autonomous Okrug
- Administrative district: Chukotsky District

Population (2010 Census)
  - Total: 301
  - Estimate (January 2018): 277 (−8%)

Municipal status
  - Municipal district: Chukotsky Municipal District
  - Rural settlement: Enurmino Rural Settlement
  - Capital of: Enurmino Rural Settlement
- Time zone: UTC+12 (MSK+9)
- Postal code: 689320
- Dialing code: +7 42736
- OKTMO ID: 77633445101

Enurmino (Russian: Энурмино; Chukchi: Иннурмин, Innurmin; Yupik language: Анушпик and also known as Ennurmin (Russian: Эннурмин) and Enyurmin (Russian: Энюрмин)) is a rural locality (a selo) in Chukotsky District of Chukotka Autonomous Okrug, Russia. It is located on the Chukchi Sea near Cape Serdtse-Kamen. Population: 301 (2010 census); Municipally, Enurmino is subordinated to Chukotsky Municipal District and incorporated as Enurmino Rural Settlement.

== History ==
=== Pre-Soviet Period ===
The name of the village comes from the Chukchi I'nnurmin, meaning "a place behind the hills", as the village is located in a valley surrounded by hills. Nearby discoveries have revealed the site of an older village where the ancestors of those who live in Enurmino used to live, with the site of the village itself sitting on top of an ancient Chukchi settlement. Nearby the village is the abandoned settlement of Chegitun (Russian: Чегитун), occupied from about 500 AD to the twentieth century, until the village was closed and the population transferred to Inchoun.

=== Soviet Period ===
In 1926, the village had a population of 103, which grew to 275 by 1943, consisting of 259 Chukchi, 1 Yupik and 15 visitors. During the Soviet period, the people of Enurmino, in collaboration with the people of Neshkan further down the northern Chukotka coast, formed the Sovkhoz 50th Anniversary of the Great October (Russian: 50-летия Великого Октября). In addition to the Sovkhoz, there was also a polar station in the village called Netten, (Russian: Нэттэн). The staff at this polar station used to play chess games over the radio with scientists at polar stations in the Antarctic.

== Demographics ==
In 1926-27, Enurmino consisted of 19 households containing 103 Chukchi. This had risen to 275 people by 1943, including 259 Chukchi, 15 Yupik and one person classified as a "visitor" upon whose nationality the source does not elaborate, though these figures are combined totals for both Enurmino and the, now abandoned, nearby village of Pouten. The population had increased further to 290 by 1989, of whom 260 were Chukchi and the remaining 30 classified again as "visitors" and again, as of March 2003, to 297, of which 296 were indigenous peoples. The reported population as at the start of 2009 showed yet another increase to 311 people, but had fallen back to 301 (2010 census); for last official census, of whom 139 were male and 162 female.

== Culture ==
In 2008, a documentary was made on the lives of the inhabitants of Enurmino by Anadyr-born director, Alexey Vakhrushev, entitled Welcome to Enurmino!, which shows the villagers trying to preserve their traditional ways of life while making the most of the limited modern amenities available to them.

== Economy ==
The main activities of the villagers are Marine mammal harvest, hunting and fishing and 7-8% of the population are actively involved in hunting.

The village has a food store, an elementary school, a daycare center and a post-office.

== Transport ==
Enurmino is not connected to any other part of the world by permanent road and is 200 miles away from the district centre Lavrentiya. The only ways to travel the village are by sea, helicopter or winter road. There is, however, a very small network of roads within the village including:

- Улица Советская (Ulitsa Sovetskaya, lit. Soviet Street)
- Улица Южная (Ulitsa Yuzhnaya, lit. South Street)

== Climate ==
Enurmino has a Tundra climate (ET) because the warmest month has an average temperature between 0 °C (32 °F) and 10 °C (50 °F).

Climate data for Enurmino, 1955-1991
Month	Jan	Feb	Mar	Apr	May	Jun	Jul	Aug	Sep	Oct	Nov	Dec	Year
Record high °C (°F)	5.0 (41.0)	3.9 (39.0)	4.5 (40.1)	3.0 (37.4)	10.0 (50.0)	30.0 (86.0)	27.2 (81.0)	23.0 (73.4)	16.0 (60.8)	14.8 (58.6)	8.6 (47.5)	3.7 (38.7)	30.0 (86.0)
Mean daily maximum °C (°F)	−18.0 (−0.4)	−21.6 (−6.9)	−20.1 (−4.2)	−13.6 (7.5)	−3.3 (26.1)	6.5 (43.7)	10.8 (51.4)	9.2 (48.6)	4.3 (39.7)	−3.0 (26.6)	−10.0 (14.0)	−17.1 (1.2)	−7.6 (18.3)
Daily mean °C (°F)	−20.9 (−5.6)	−24.2 (−11.6)	−23 (−9)	−16.6 (2.1)	−5.2 (22.6)	3.6 (38.5)	7.3 (45.1)	6.5 (43.7)	2.6 (36.7)	−4.9 (23.2)	−12.4 (9.7)	−19.6 (−3.3)	−10.2 (13.6)
Mean daily minimum °C (°F)	−23.5 (−10.3)	−26.5 (−15.7)	−25.5 (−13.9)	−19.5 (−3.1)	−7.1 (19.2)	1.1 (34.0)	4.4 (39.9)	4.5 (40.1)	1.2 (34.2)	−6.5 (20.3)	−14.5 (5.9)	−22.0 (−7.6)	−12.5 (9.5)
Record low °C (°F)	−43.8 (−46.8)	−42.2 (−44.0)	−42.2 (−44.0)	−34.0 (−29.2)	−25.0 (−13.0)	−7.8 (18.0)	−5.0 (23.0)	−4.0 (24.8)	−8.9 (16.0)	−26.0 (−14.8)	−30.8 (−23.4)	−37.8 (−36.0)	−43.8 (−46.8)
Average rainfall mm (inches)	25.2 (0.99)	6.7 (0.26)	8.5 (0.33)	6.3 (0.25)	13.1 (0.52)	9.4 (0.37)	6.8 (0.27)	11.7 (0.46)	8.8 (0.35)	12.6 (0.50)	9.2 (0.36)	9.9 (0.39)	128.2 (5.05)
Average snowy days	15	10	10	14	14	4	0	1	6	18	20	13	125

== See also ==
- List of inhabited localities in Chukotsky District
