= Chegitun =

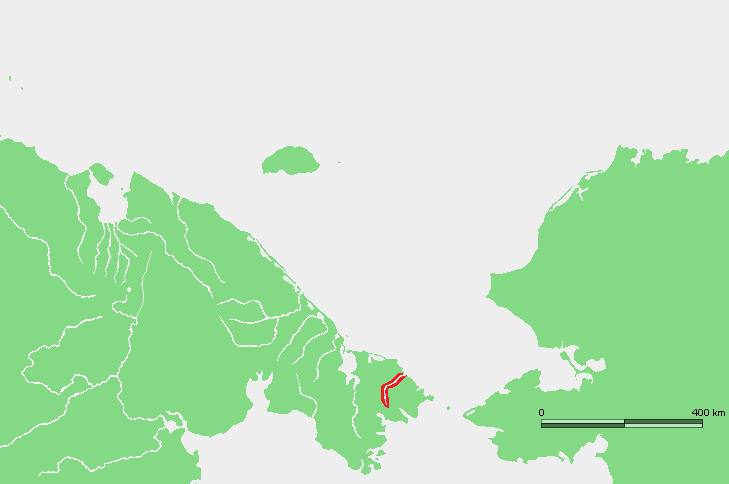
- Location of the Chegitun River course
- Native name: Чегитун (Russian)

Location
- Country: Chukotka, Russia

Physical characteristics
- Source
  - location: Ghenkanyi Range
  - coordinates: 66°1′5″N 171°38′24″W
- Mouth: Chukchi Sea
  - coordinates: 66.5576°N 171.0758°W
  - elevation: 0 m (0 ft)
- Length: 137 km (85 mi)
- Basin size: 4,120 km^{2} (1,590 sq mi)

Basin features
- Tributaries
  - left: Linkultveyem, Runliveyem, Kaatapveyem, Tanatap, Tagenkytop, Vetkhuvaam
  - right: Khrebetna, Runliveyem, Kelkhiuyem, Melyuluelkalveyem, Hesmymken, Keseteveyem, Putukuneyveyem, Gunguveem, Ikkiveyem

The Chegitun (Russian: Чегитун) is a river located in the Chukotka Peninsula in Far East Siberia. It is the easternmost river flowing into the Chukchi Sea from the Siberian side, which makes it the easternmost significant river of the Eurasian continent. It is 137 kilometres (85 mi) long, and has a drainage basin of 4,120 square kilometres (1,590 sq mi).

The name of the river is based in the Eskimo–Aleut term Sahtuk, meaning 'straightened', which became Чегтун in the Chukchi language.

The waters of the river are an important spawning ground for Arctic char, Taranets char, Siberian salmon, Pink salmon, Chum salmon, Sockeye salmon and Dolly Varden trout are common in its waters.

== Geography ==
The Chegitun flows in a roughly northeastern direction and crosses the Arctic Circle a few miles before it meets the sea in a 500 m wide estuary. Close to its mouth there is the small abandoned village of Chegitun; the villages of Inchoun and Uelen are located not far down the coast. The Chegitun is frozen from October to June.

This river and its basin belong to the Chukotka Autonomous Okrug administrative region of Russia. The lower part of the river is included in the Beringia National Park.

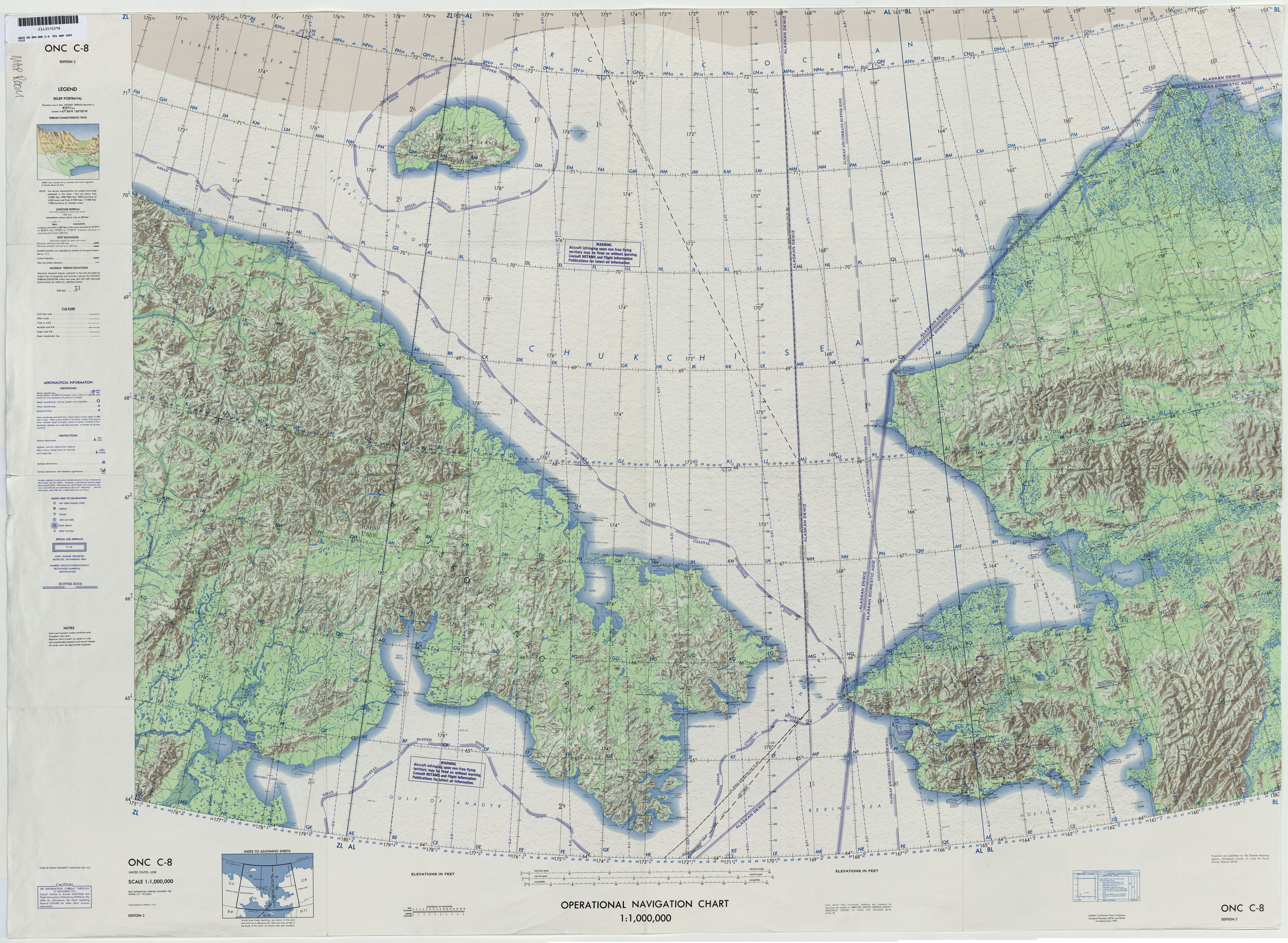
Defense Mapping Agency topographical map of the Chukchi Sea, 1973
