= Lorino =

Lorino may refer to:

- Lorino, Umbria, a place in Ferentillo, Italy
- Lorino, Chukotka Autonomous Okrug, a rural locality in Chukotsky District of Chukotka Autonomous Okrug
