= Lavrentiya Airport =

Airport

Lavrentiya
- IATA: none; ICAO: UHML; LID: ЗЛА

Summary
- Airport type: Public
- Location: Lavrentiya
- Elevation AMSL: 30 ft / 9 m
- Coordinates: 65°34′48″N 170°59′48″W

Map
- Location in Chukotka Autonomous Okrug

Runways
Direction	Length		Surface
Direction	ft	m	Surface
14/32	3,904	1,190	Gravel and sand

Lavrentiya Airport (ICAO: UHML) is an airport in Chukotsky District, Chukotka Autonomous Okrug, Russia, located 1 kilometre (0.6 mi) south of Lavrentiya. It consists of a small airstrip with a tarmac. It is the easternmost airport of continental Asia, and the easternmost airport on continental earth.

== Airlines and destinations ==
Airlines	Destinations
Chukotavia	Anadyr

== See also ==
- List of airports in Russia
