= Koolen (lake) =

Lake of Chukotsky District, Chukotka Autonomous Okrug, Russia

- Коолень (Russian); Koolёn (Chukot); Koglu (Eskimo–Aleut languages)
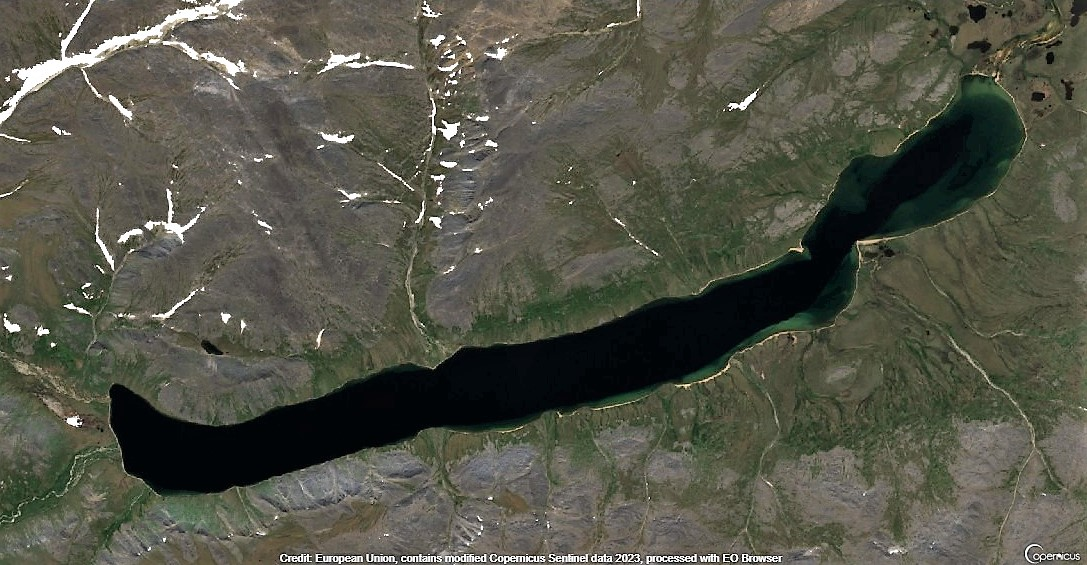
- Koolen Sentinel-2 image

- Location in Chukotka Autonomous Okrug, Russia
- Location: Chukotsky District, Chukotka Autonomous Okrug
- Coordinates: 65°56′N 171°6′W
- Primary inflows: Gytgykoymavaam, Endoyguem
- Primary outflows: Koolenveyem
- Basin countries: Russia
- Max. length: 15 km (9.3 mi)
- Max. width: 1.5 km (0.93 mi)
- Surface area: 264 km^{2} (102 sq mi)
- Max. depth: 100 m (330 ft)
- Surface elevation: 42 m (138 ft)
- Frozen: From October to June

Koolen (Eskimo–Aleut: Koglu) is a lake of Chukotsky District, Chukotka Autonomous Okrug, Russia. Its name originated in the Chukchi word Koolёn, a fault or deep chasm.

== Geography ==
Koolen is a long and narrow lake located in the Inan Range area of the Chukotka Mountains, at the eastern end of the Chukotka Peninsula, 13 km from the coast of the Chukchi Sea. The highest point near the lake is Mount Yttyvyt, a 939-metre-high (3,081 ft) mountain.

Koolen has a tectonic origin. Its water has a very weak content in minerals and is very transparent. The lake has a deep-blue tint and in the areas of greater depths the blue is so dark that it looks almost black. The area around the lake is uninhabited, the nearest town is Lavrentiya, located 44 km to the southwest.

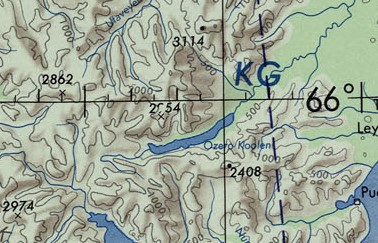
Koolen map section

== Fauna ==
Arctic char, least cisco and grayling are common in the waters of the lake.

== See also ==
- List of lakes of Russia
