= Uelen =

Uelen Уэлен Увэлен (Chukchi)
- Selo
- Interactive map of Uelen
- Location in Russia
- Coordinates: 66°09′34″N 169°48′33″W
- Country: Russia
- Federal subject: Chukotka Autonomous Okrug
- Administrative district: Chukotsky District
- Elevation: 3 m (9.8 ft)

Population (2010 Census)
  - Total: 720
  - Estimate (January 2018): 619 (−14%)

Municipal status
  - Municipal district: Chukotsky Municipal District
  - Rural settlement: Uelen Rural Settlement
  - Capital of: Uelen Rural Settlement
- Time zone: UTC+12 (MSK+9)
- Postal code: 689310
- Dialing code: +7 42736
- OKTMO ID: 77633440101

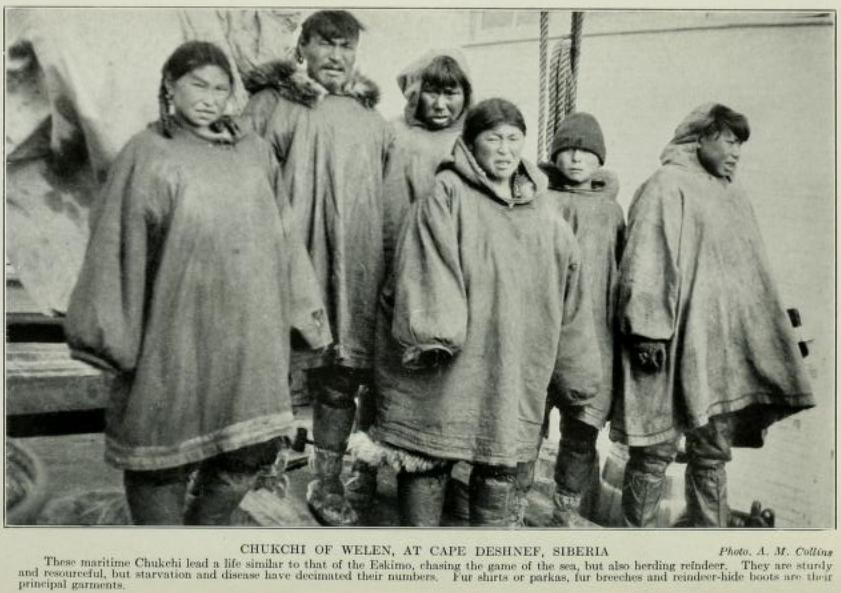
Residents of Uelen, 1913

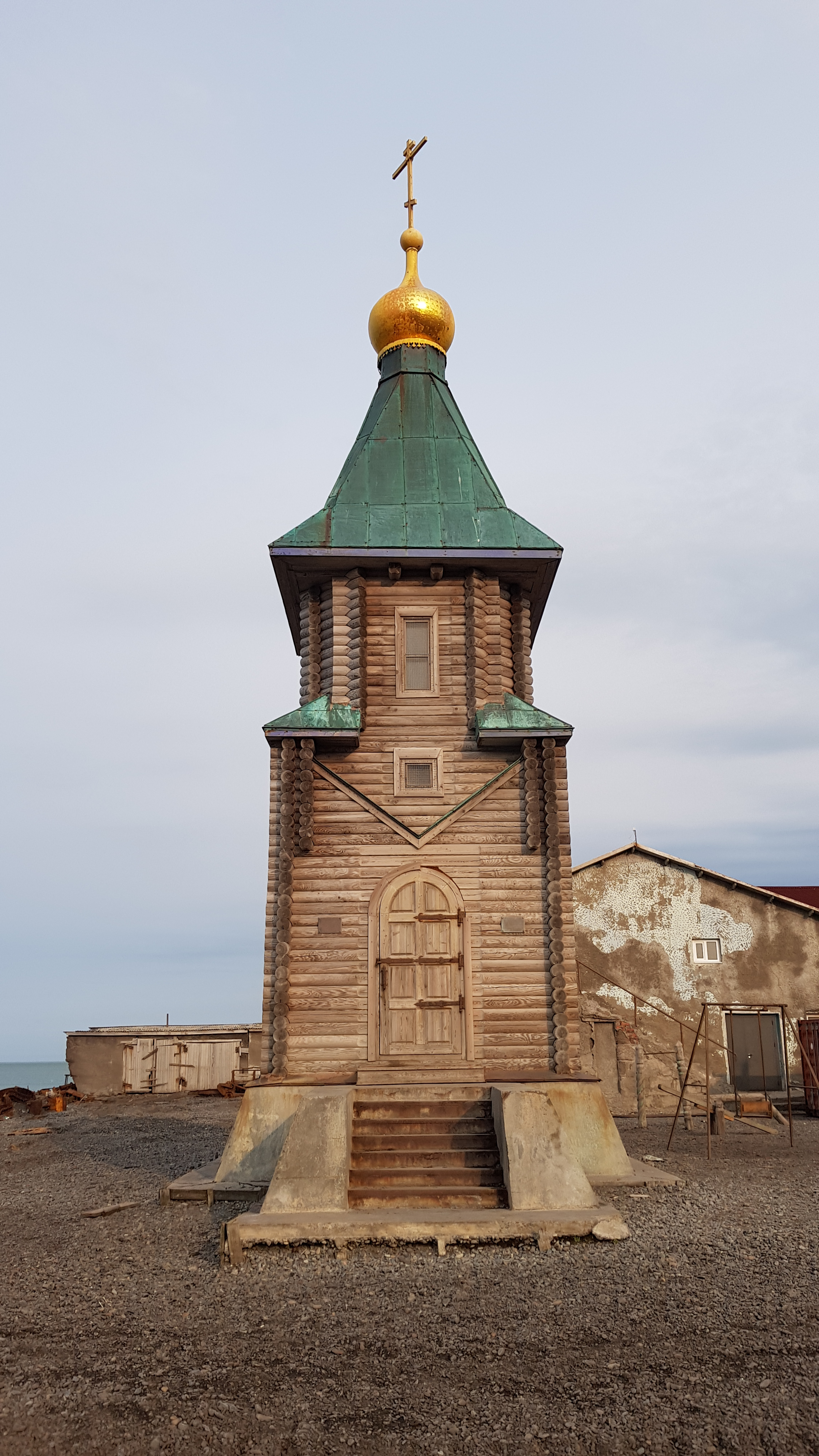
Uelen Orthodox church, August 2018

Uelen (Note: Russian: Уэлéн; Chukchi: Увэлен, Uvèlèn; Siberian Yupik: Улыӄ, Ulyḳ; Naukan Yupik: Олыӄ, Oleq; Iñupiaq: Ualeq; also known as Whalen in older English-language sources and Ugelen on United States Coast and Geodetic Survey charts) is a rural locality (a selo) in Chukotsky District, just south of the Arctic Circle in Chukotka Autonomous Okrug in the Russian Far East. As of the 2010 Census, its population was 720. Located near Cape Dezhnev where the Bering Sea meets the Chukchi Sea, it is the easternmost settlement in Russia and the whole of Asia. It is located in the Western Hemisphere, but the International Date Line curves around it, so it remains in a Russian time zone (UTC+12:00). Uelen is also the closest Asian settlement to North America. It is on the northeast corner of the Uelen Lagoon, a roughly 15 by 3 kilometres (9 by 2 miles) east-west lagoon separated from the ocean by a sandspit. Municipally, Uelen is subordinated to Chukotsky Municipal District and is incorporated as Uelen Rural Settlement.

== History ==
=== Origins of name ===
There are a number of competing ideas as to the origin of the name of the village. The name Uelen is thought by some sources to derive from the Chukchi "uvelen" meaning "black, thawed patch", since the village is found at the foot of a hill surrounded by black mounds which are visible throughout the year and were often used as a navigation aid in the region.

There is a local legend which offers a second explanation for the origin of the name. It describes the life of a strong local man called Uvelel'yn (literally translated as "slob"), named so because he was an orphan who was dressed solely in tattered rags. As he grew older, he used his strength to gain his revenge over the local people that bullied him during his childhood because of his background. In fear for their lives, the villagers killed Uvelel'yn. However they realised that in order to prevent these events repeating themselves in the future, they should take better care of their orphans and the village soon got its name to remind the villagers of their duty to those less fortunate than themselves.

Prior to being named Uelen, the village was called Ulyk (Russian: Улык, Olyk in Yupik and Pok’ytkyn in Chukchi), meaning land's end and flooded place respectively.

The first mention of the name Uelen appears on a map from the Billings-Sarychev expedition from 1792. The obsolete English name Whalen is an anglicisation of the local name, and has no relation to the surname Whalen.

=== Prehistory ===
Archeological investigation has revealed the existence of a settlement in and around the present day site of the village about 30 km (19 mi) from the village for at least 2,000 years, based on fishing and the hunting of marine mammals. The main site of archeological investigation is at the Ekven site, a site of importance comparable to that of the Ipiutak site across the Bering Strait on Point Hope.

=== Pre-Soviet ===
Prior to the Russian Revolution, Uelen was, in 1912, a settlement of around 300 individuals divided into four communes and the headquarters of the Russian administration in the Chukotka Region ("Uyezd") and was an important trading port with both local Russian people and America.

=== Soviet Union ===
Following the Russian Revolution of 1917, Uelen became one of the first trade co-operatives in Chukotka and a dedicated American trading post was established. The first school in Chukotka was established in Uelen in 1916.

In the first half of the 20th century, Uelen was the site of one of the first Russian arctic research stations.

In the 1950s, Uelen became a focal point in the region, along with Lavrentiya, Lorino and Inchoun (see diagram) for the relocation of indigenous peoples following the decision to close a large number of uneconomical villages. Uelen absorbed the population from the nearby village of Dezhnevo (named, like the neighbouring cape, after the explorer Semyon Dezhnev). This village, to the west of Cape Peek and called Keniskun by the local Chukchi was an important regional coastal trading centre in the late 19th and early 20th centuries, but was deemed unviable by the Soviet government and the villagers were moved to Uelen. The addition of Dezhnevo carvers to the existing artistic school in Uelen served to strengthen Uelen's cultural reputation not just in the region but across Russia with notable carvers such as Pyotr Penkok and Stepan Ettugi working in Uelen. In addition to absorbing the population of Dezhnevo, Uelen also absorbed the part of the population of the former village of Naukan, which itself had absorbed the population of a number of small villages from the Cape Dezhnev/Diomede Islands area.

=== Post-Soviet ===
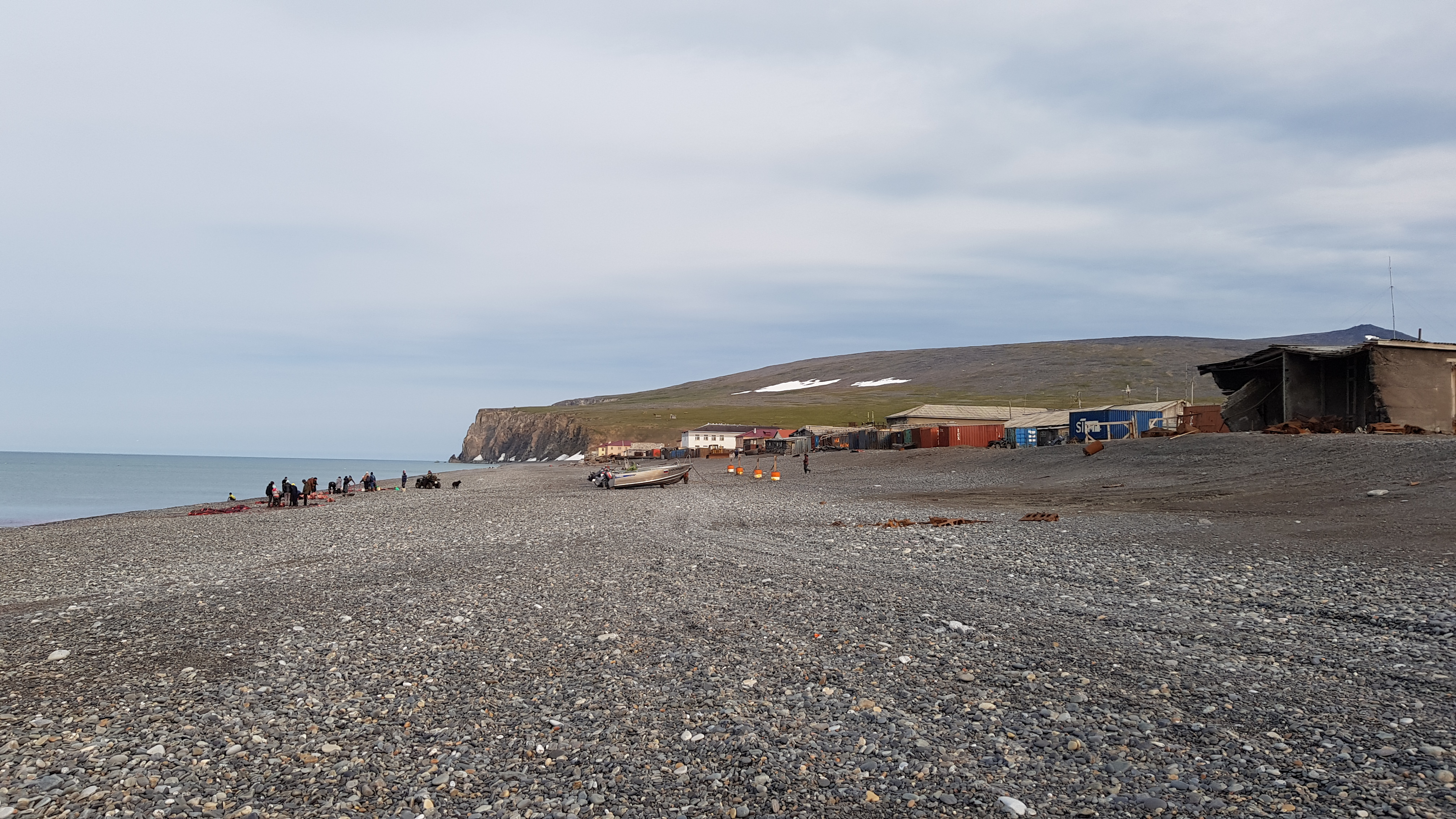
Uelen beach on Arctic Ocean, August 2018

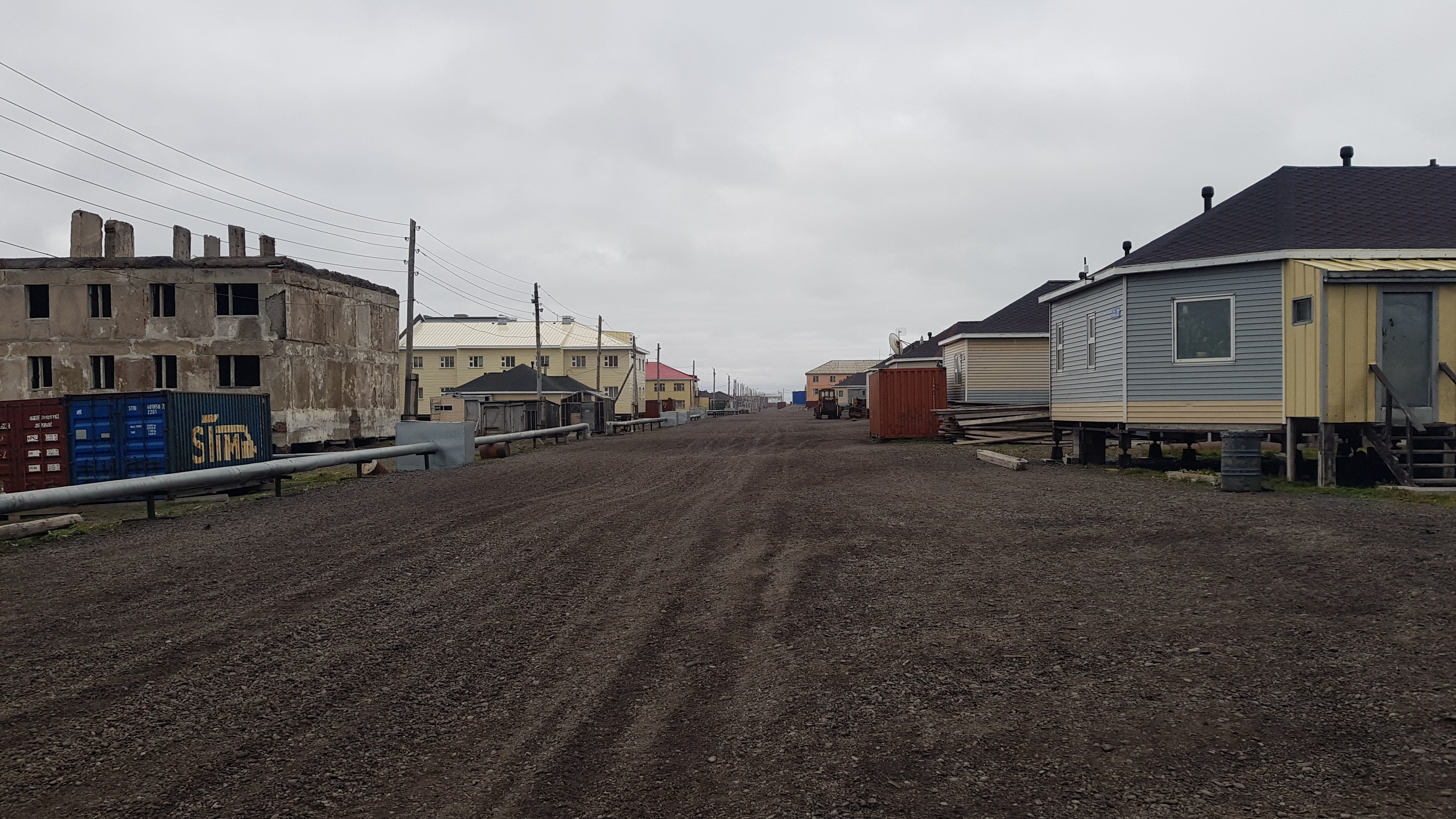
Lenin Street, Uelen, August 2018

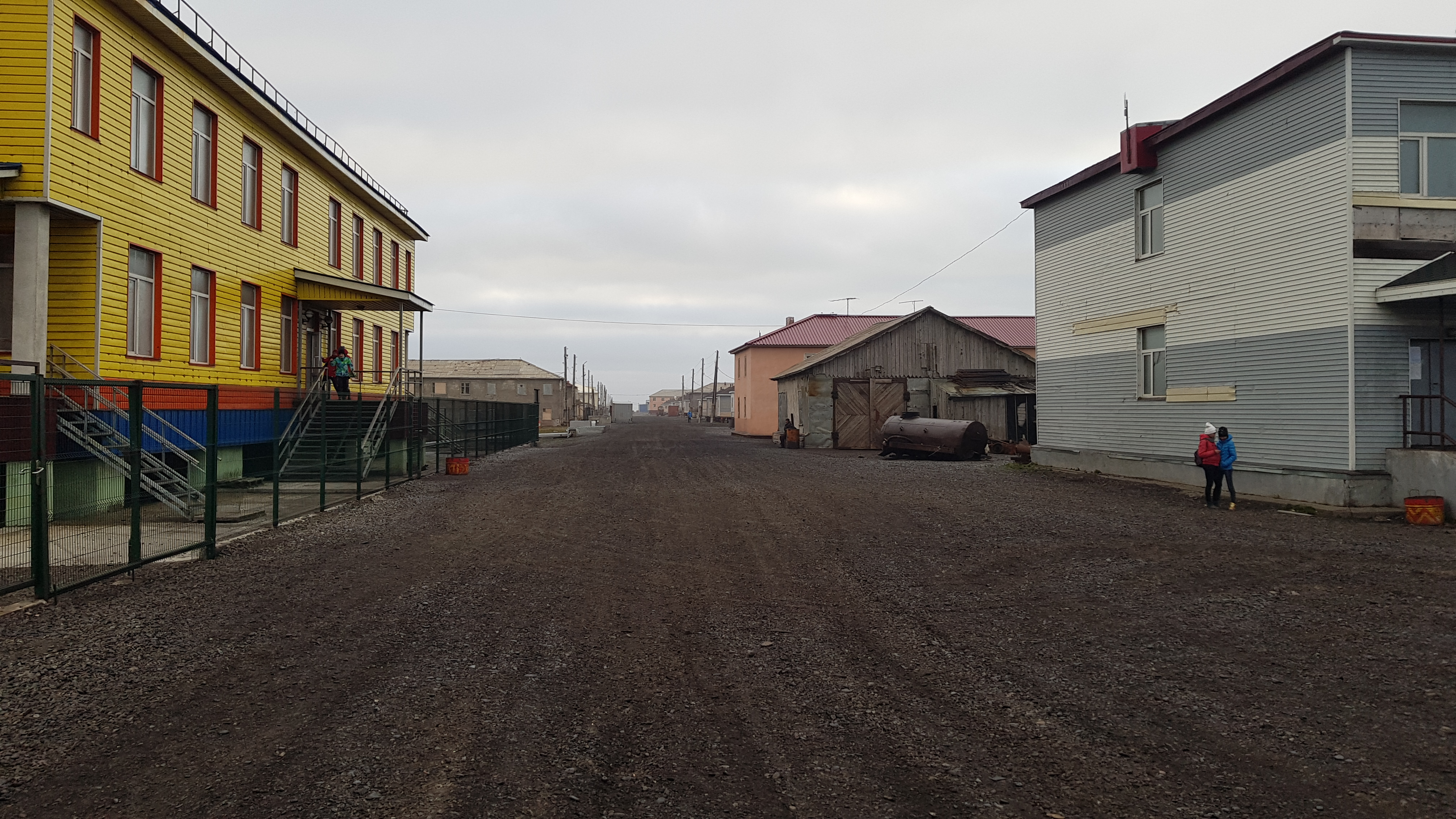
Uelen streets, August 2018

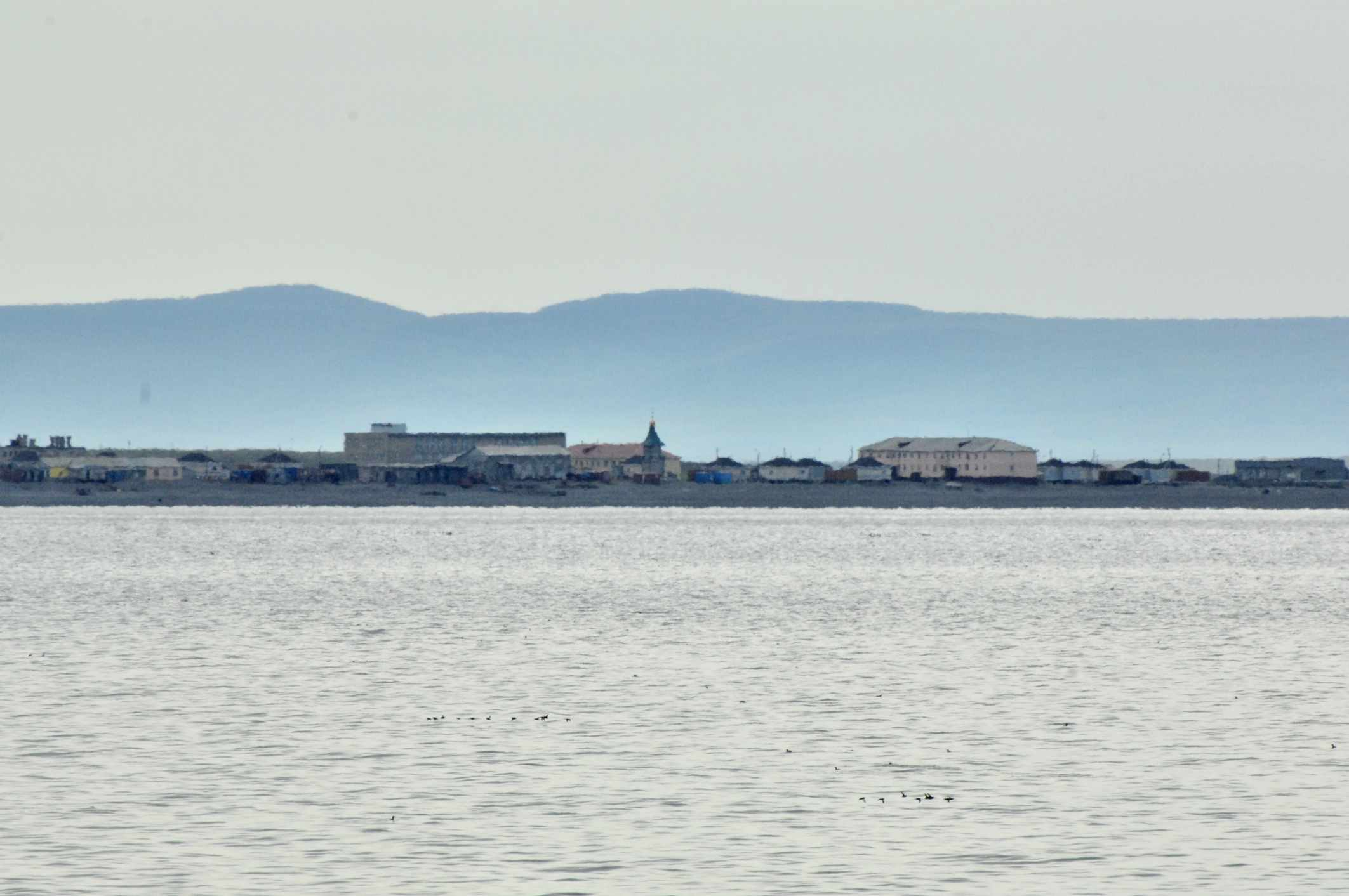
Uelen (Chukotka, Russia) 2013

Although Dezhnevo was officially abolished, the villagers in Uelen still use it as a base for their fishing and a handful of houses are still maintained for this purpose. As well as a fishing base, the site of the village is still used as an occasional port by Uelen. At the end of summer, storms in the Chukchi Sea can make it impossible for ships to dock at Uelen to unload their supplies. When this occurs, the ships dock at Dezhnevo and the cargo is carried across land to Uelen.

In more recent history, Uelen is where Dimitri Kieffer and Karl Bushby entered Russia during their Goliath Expedition after crossing the Bering Strait. The two were then arrested because they had failed to enter the country at a proper port of entry, but their journey was allowed to continue.

== Demographics ==
The population according to the most recent census results was 740, of whom 368 were male and 352 female. Uelen had a population of 740 at the start of 2009, down from 776 in 2003 (with 595 Chukchi and 72 Yupik.) Other villagers are Russian.

== Culture ==
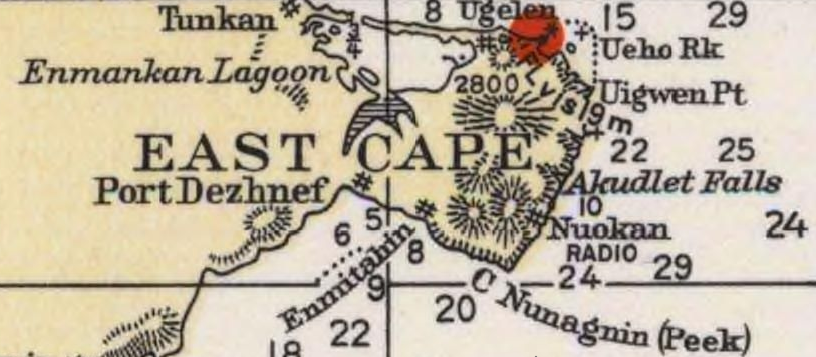
Detail of 1937 USCGS chart showing Cape Dezhnev (East Cape) with the historical villages Tunkan, Uelen (Ugelen), Naukan (Nuokan), Enmitahin, and Dezhnevo (Port Dezhnev) marked

The village is famous for its walrus ivory carvings. It has long been a major artistic centre in the region, with Several of the leading exponents of the craft, such as Vukvutagin, Vukvol, Tukkai and Khukhutan working out of Uelen. The Uelen Bone Carving Studio (Russian: Уэленская косторезная мастерская) contains the world's only museum of Walrus ivory carving. In 2004, a successful exhibition of their work was held in Bern, Switzerland, and carvers from Uelen took first place in the category Russian hunt: Tradition and Modernity at the third Moscow Exhibition of Russian Crafts.

It is also home to an indigenous choir which has a history of cultural collaboration with Inuit across the Bering Strait in Alaska.

The writer Yuri Rytkheu was born in Uelen on March 8, 1930, to a family of trappers and hunters. He was the first Chukchi author to achieve national prominence. His book A Dream in Polar Fog deals with the Chukchi people's efforts to adapt when a foreigner is shipwrecked on their shores.

The village also serves as a base for archaeology expeditions to the area, which have uncovered a burial ground containing more than 300 burials of Early Whale Hunter cultures, covering a time span from 500 BCE to 1000 CE. These excavations have shown that Uelen was a major settlement in the area in the first few centuries CE, as well as revealing the existence of a culture dependent on whale and walrus hunting, archeologists have also unearthed early examples of the indigenous peoples ivory carvings, a number of which are now held at the Peter the Great Museum of Anthropology and Ethnography in St. Petersburg.

== Transport ==
Uelen is not connected by road to any other part of the world and is 100 km from the district centre, Lavrentiya. However, there is a small network of roads in the village including:

- Улица Дежнева (Ulitsa Dezhneva, lit. Dezhnyov Street)
- Улица Ленина (Ulitsa Lenina, lit. Lenin Street)
- Улица Набережная (Ulitsa Naberezhnaya, lit. Quay Street)

== Climate ==
Uelen has a tundra climate (Köppen ET). Chukotsky district endures extreme Arctic weather, with an average winter low of −22 °C (−7.6 °F) in January, though Uelen's average January temperature is slightly higher at −19 °C (−2.2 °F). February is the coldest month. The average July temperature is slightly higher at +5.9 °C (42.6 °F) than the district average for the month of +5.4 °C (41.7 °F), and the overall annual average of −6.7 °C (19.9 °F) is also higher than the district average of −8.2 °C (17.2 °F). Snow storms in the winter from the north cause harsh frosts and drifting snow, whilst southerly blizzards bring large snowfalls and sudden thaws. The area is also very windy, reaching 35 m/s (68 kn) annually and 50 m/s (97 kn) every two decades. Spring weather is a little milder than winter weather if still below freezing. Due to the position of Uelen by the sea coast there are also many instances of fog and mist per year with the result that sunshine hours are very low especially when the adjacent ocean begins to thaw. The record high is +25.0 °C (77.0 °F) on July 16, 1960, and the record low is −44.1 °C (−47.4 °F) on January 29, 1989.

Climate data for Uelen (1991–2020 normals)
Month	Jan	Feb	Mar	Apr	May	Jun	Jul	Aug	Sep	Oct	Nov	Dec	Year
Record high °C (°F)	6.1 (43.0)	5.6 (42.1)	4.3 (39.7)	8.9 (48.0)	10.8 (51.4)	22.1 (71.8)	25.0 (77.0)	22.0 (71.6)	16.3 (61.3)	14.2 (57.6)	9.0 (48.2)	10.0 (50.0)	25.0 (77.0)
Mean daily maximum °C (°F)	−16.5 (2.3)	−16.0 (3.2)	−15.0 (5.0)	−8.6 (16.5)	−0.3 (31.5)	6.2 (43.2)	10.3 (50.5)	9.3 (48.7)	5.9 (42.6)	1.6 (34.9)	−3.6 (25.5)	−11.7 (10.9)	−3.2 (26.2)
Daily mean °C (°F)	−19.5 (−3.1)	−19.2 (−2.6)	−18.5 (−1.3)	−11.8 (10.8)	−2.5 (27.5)	3.3 (37.9)	7.1 (44.8)	6.9 (44.4)	4.2 (39.6)	−0.1 (31.8)	−6.0 (21.2)	−14.3 (6.3)	−5.9 (21.4)
Mean daily minimum °C (°F)	−22.6 (−8.7)	−22.4 (−8.3)	−21.9 (−7.4)	−15.0 (5.0)	−4.5 (23.9)	1.2 (34.2)	4.6 (40.3)	4.9 (40.8)	2.6 (36.7)	−1.8 (28.8)	−8.7 (16.3)	−17.2 (1.0)	−8.4 (16.9)
Record low °C (°F)	−44.1 (−47.4)	−43.2 (−45.8)	−43.6 (−46.5)	−37.2 (−35.0)	−25.0 (−13.0)	−10.0 (14.0)	−1.6 (29.1)	−2.2 (28.0)	−7.8 (18.0)	−22.0 (−7.6)	−34.0 (−29.2)	−41.1 (−42.0)	−44.1 (−47.4)
Average precipitation mm (inches)	18.6 (0.73)	18.2 (0.72)	12.3 (0.48)	15.2 (0.60)	13.9 (0.55)	14.2 (0.56)	31.7 (1.25)	42.5 (1.67)	36.1 (1.42)	43.3 (1.70)	22.9 (0.90)	19.5 (0.77)	288.4 (11.35)
Average rainy days	0.03	1	0.1	1	4	10	15	18	18	9	2	1	59.13
Average snowy days	16	15	18	14	16	5	1	1	7	21	23	18	155
Average relative humidity (%)	82	80	81	83	88	89	89	90	88	86	84	84	85
Mean monthly sunshine hours	3.1	62.1	161.2	186.0	148.8	204.0	201.5	117.8	66.0	24.8	15.0	0.0	1,190.3
Source 1: Roshydromet
Source 2: allmetsat.com (sunshine hours)

== See also ==
- List of inhabited localities in Chukotsky District
