= Inchoun =

Inchoun Инчоун И’нчувин (Chukchi)
- Selo
- Interactive map of Inchoun
- Location in Russia
- Coordinates: 66°18′N 170°17′W
- Country: Russia
- Federal subject: Chukotka Autonomous Okrug
- Administrative district: Chukotsky District

Population (2010 Census)
  - Total: 387
  - Estimate (January 2018): 365 (−5.7%)

Municipal status
  - Municipal district: Chukotsky Municipal District
  - Rural settlement: Inchoun Rural Settlement
  - Capital of: Inchoun Rural Settlement
- Time zone: UTC+12 (MSK+9)
- Postal code: 689313
- Dialing code: +7 42736
- OKTMO ID: 77633410101

Inchoun (Russian: Инчоун, Chukchi: И’нчувин, I’nčuvin; Yupik: Инсиг’вик) is a rural locality (a selo) in Chukotsky District of Chukotka Autonomous Okrug, Russia. It is located on the shores of the Chukchi Sea, about 25 kilometers (16 mi) west of Uelen. Population: 387 (2010 census); Municipally Inchoun is subordinated to Chukotsky Municipal District and is incorporated as Inchoun Rural Settlement.

== History ==
=== Pre-history ===
The name of the village comes from the Chukchi word I'nchuvin, meaning "a cut-off nose tip". This strange appellation is derived from a nearby cliff with a large rock at its base that is said to look like a nose cut from a face. There is a Chukchi dancing troupe in the village called Vyrykvyn.

Excavations carried out by the Museum of Chukotka Heritage Centre and the State Museum of Northern Art at the Palpeygak (Russian: Пальпейгак) site (named after a nearby eponymous creek) revealed finds indicating that the area had been inhabited for the last 3000 years

=== Twentieth century ===
In the 1950s, construction began on wooden houses in the village and by 1957, the first nine families moved out of their Yaranga and into these new houses.

== Demographics ==
The population of the village as of 2009 was 398 an increase on the estimate in 2008 of 365, which itself was down from the figure given in March 2003 of 373 (of which 353 were indigenous peoples). The official census results indicate a slight reduction on the 2009 estimate to 387, of whom 185 were male and 202 female.

== Transport ==
Inchoun is 150 miles from the district centre Lavrentiya and is not connected to any other part of the world by permanent road. However, there is a small network of roads within the settlement including:

- Улица Ачиргина (Ulitsa Achyrgyna)
- Улица Коммунистическая (Ulitsa Kommunisticheskaya, lit. Communist Street)
- Улица Морзверобоев (Ulitsa Morzveroboyev, li. Walrus-hunting Brigade Street)
- Улица Тенетегина (Ulitsa Tenetegina)
- Улица Центральная (Ulitsa Tsentralnaya, lit. Central Street)
- Улица Шипина (Ulitsa Shipina)
- Улица Школьная (Ulitsa Shkolnaya, lit. School Street)

== Climate ==
Inchoun has a Tundra climate (ET) because the warmest month has an average temperature between 0 °C (32 °F) and 10 °C (50 °F).

Climate data for Inchoun
Month	Jan	Feb	Mar	Apr	May	Jun	Jul	Aug	Sep	Oct	Nov	Dec	Year
Record high °C (°F)	4.7 (40.5)	5.5 (41.9)	3.9 (39.0)	6.4 (43.5)	10.5 (50.9)	18.4 (65.1)	22.7 (72.9)	22 (72)	16.3 (61.3)	12 (54)	8.7 (47.7)	10 (50)	22.7 (72.9)
Mean daily maximum °C (°F)	−17.9 (−0.2)	−16.7 (1.9)	−15.8 (3.6)	−9.1 (15.6)	−0.7 (30.7)	5.6 (42.1)	10 (50)	9.2 (48.6)	5.4 (41.7)	0.5 (32.9)	−4.7 (23.5)	−13.9 (7.0)	−4 (25)
Mean daily minimum °C (°F)	−23.9 (−11.0)	−22.8 (−9.0)	−22.3 (−8.1)	−15.2 (4.6)	−4.6 (23.7)	1 (34)	4.8 (40.6)	4.8 (40.6)	2.2 (36.0)	−3 (27)	−9.8 (14.4)	−19 (−2)	−9 (16)
Record low °C (°F)	−44.1 (−47.4)	−41.5 (−42.7)	−41.4 (−42.5)	−31.1 (−24.0)	−24.5 (−12.1)	−5.6 (21.9)	−4.7 (23.5)	−2.7 (27.1)	−6.1 (21.0)	−19.9 (−3.8)	−33.6 (−28.5)	−41.2 (−42.2)	−44.1 (−47.4)
Average rainfall mm (inches)	19 (0.7)	20 (0.8)	13.8 (0.54)	18.1 (0.71)	18.8 (0.74)	15.1 (0.59)	40.4 (1.59)	46.2 (1.82)	35.9 (1.41)	45.4 (1.79)	28.8 (1.13)	18.4 (0.72)	319.9 (12.59)
Average snowy days	14	12	11	15	13	3	0	0	4	17	20	15	124

== Photo gallery ==
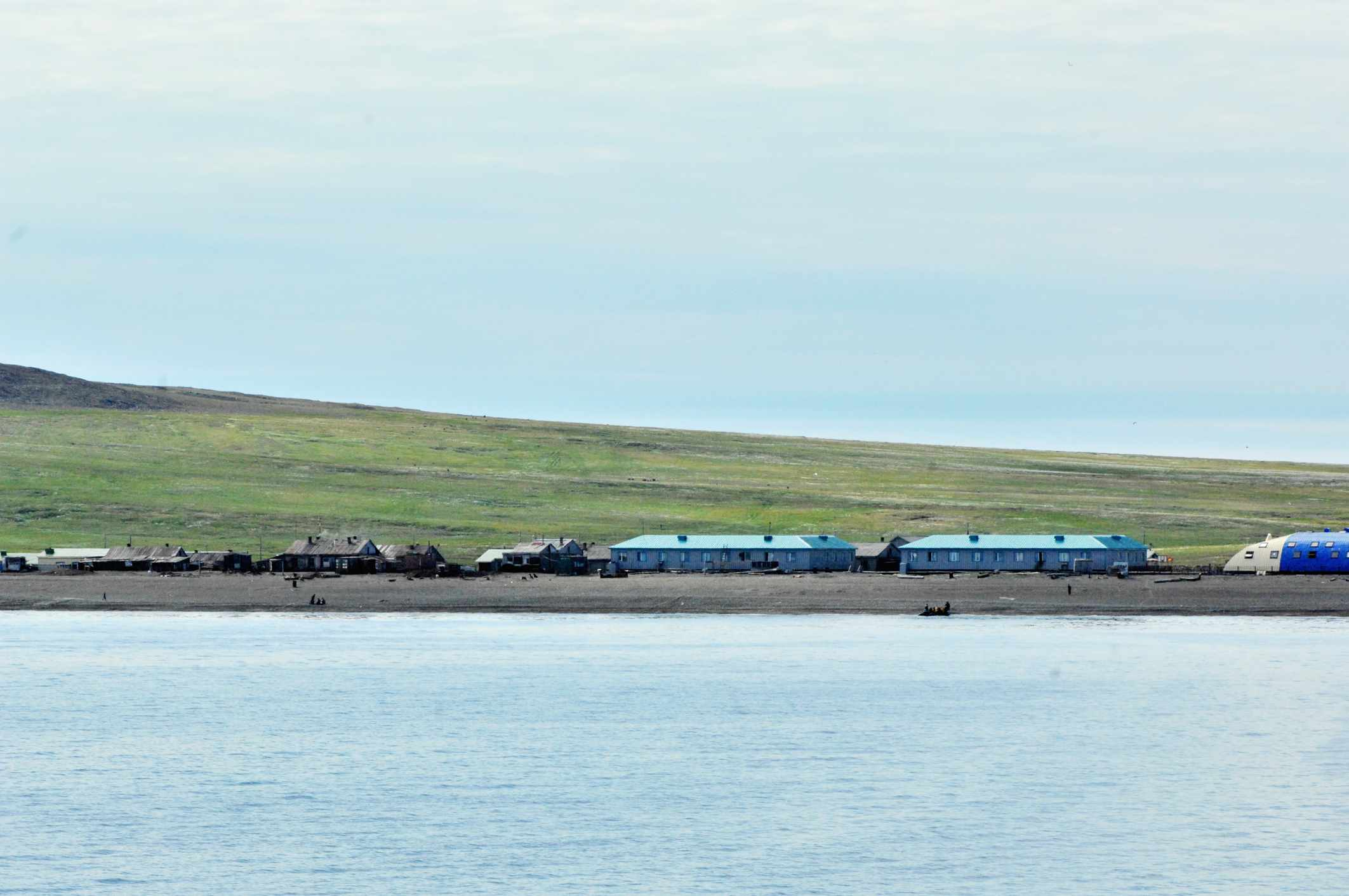
Inchoun Village (Chukchi Sea, Russia;
66°17’56‘‘N, 170°17‘6‘‘W)

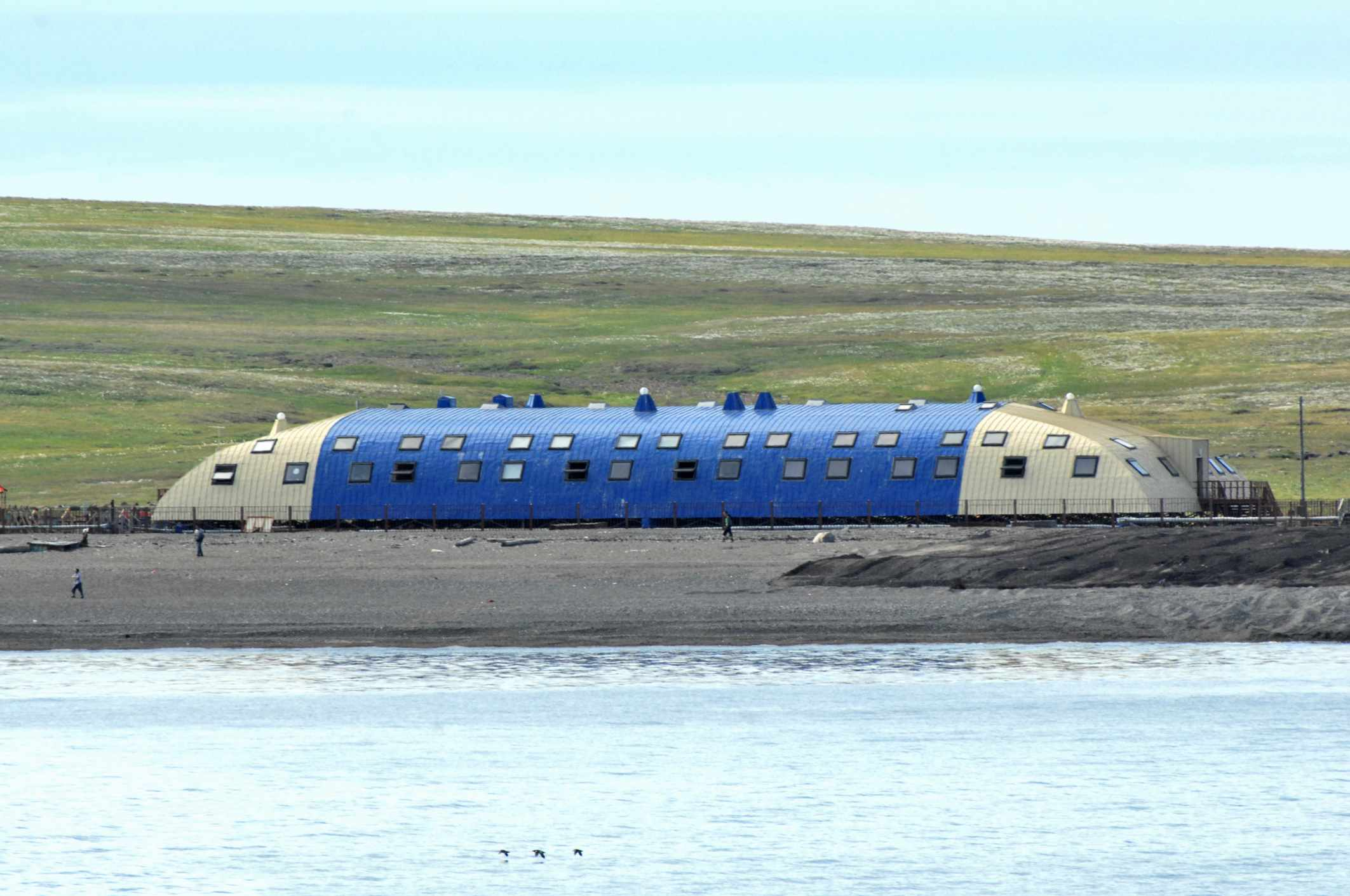
Inchoun Village, schoolhouse

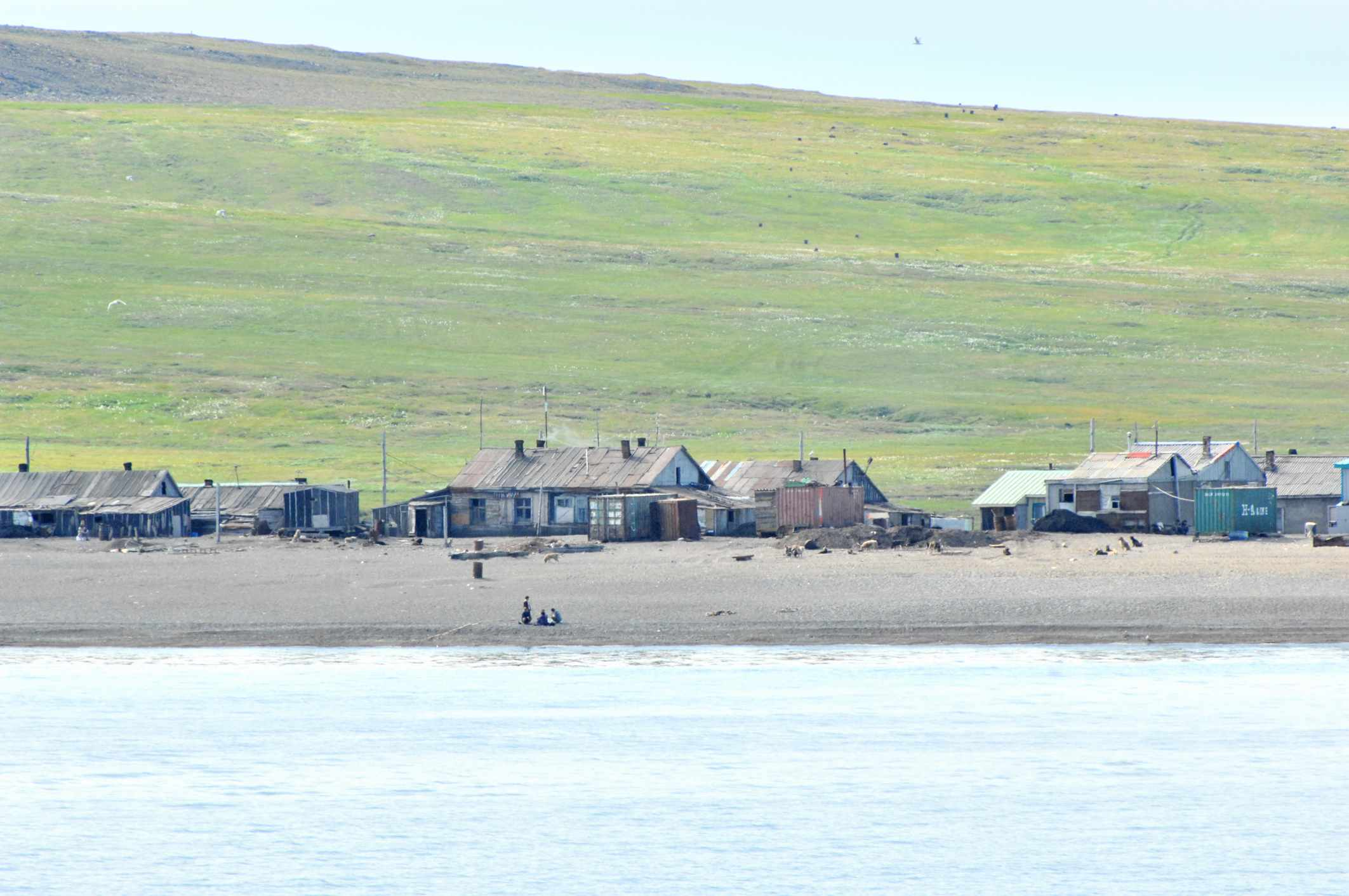
Inchoun Village

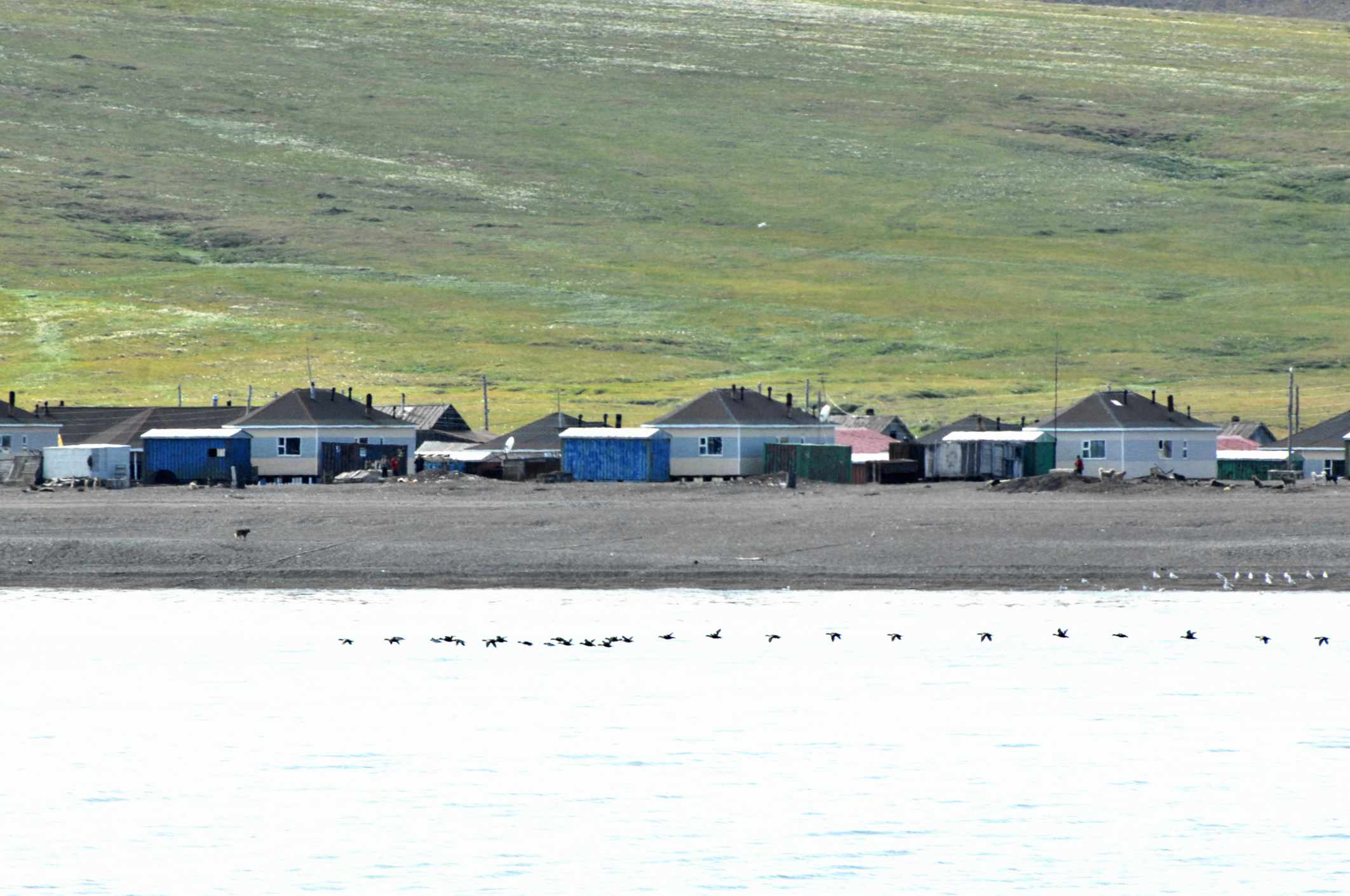
Inchoun Village

== See also ==
- List of inhabited localities in Chukotsky District
