= Lorino, Chukotka Autonomous Okrug =

Lorino Лорино Ԓьурэн (Chukchi)
- Selo
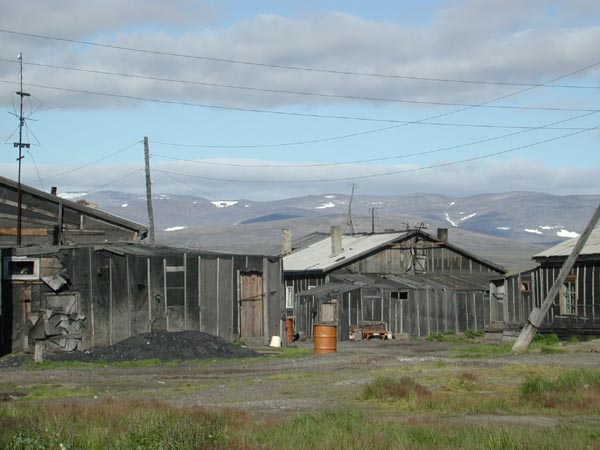
- A typical family home in Lorino
- Interactive map of Lorino
- Location of Lorino Lorino (Chukotka Autonomous Okrug)
- Coordinates: 65°30′15″N 171°42′15″W
- Country: Russia
- Federal subject: Chukotka Autonomous Okrug
- Administrative district: Chukotsky District

Population (2010 Census)
  - Total: 1,267
  - Estimate (January 2018): 998 (−21.2%)

Municipal status
  - Municipal district: Chukotsky Municipal District
  - Rural settlement: Lorino Rural Settlement
  - Capital of: Lorino Rural Settlement
- Time zone: UTC+12 (MSK+9)
- Postal code: 689315
- Dialing code: +7 42736
- OKTMO ID: 77633423101

Lorino (Russian: Лорино; Chukchi: Ԓьурэн, Ḷ'urèn, lit. found camp; Naukan: Lluughraq) is a rural locality (a selo) in Chukotsky District of Chukotka Autonomous Okrug, Russia. It is located on the boundary of the Chukchi Sea and the Bering Sea. Population: 1,267 (2010 census); Municipally, Lorino is subordinated to Chukotsky Municipal District and incorporated as Lorino Rural Settlement.

== Geography ==
Lorino is the largest indigenous village in the whole autonomous okrug and larger even than Lavrentiya, the administrative centre of the district, which is found to the north-east. The village is located on the shores of the Bering Sea, on the Mechigmen spit. it is 40.5 km to the district centre. Near the village are the Lorinski (Kukunyskie) hot springs.

== History ==
The name "Lorino" comes from the Chukchi "льурэн" (lyuren), meaning "found camp". The first mention of Lorino comes from the 18th century, with the modern Chukchi village located on the site of the former Eskimo settlement of Nukak [6]. The main occupations of the inhabitants are sea mammal hunting, reindeer herding and fishing and the village is the base for the municipal agricultural enterprise "Keper" (Russian: Кэпэр). A fox farm was established in the village in 1955 and a processing factory for seafood and meat canning was opened in 2009.

== Culture ==
The area around the village was used as the setting for the film The Chief of Chukotka. The Lorino hot springs are located 15 kilometers (9.3 mi) from the village.

The village has a high school, a daycare center, a boarding school, a cultural center, a food store, a hospital, a post-office, and a breeding farm with more than 300 Arctic foxes. The Lorino Dawns native ensemble under the guidance of N. Ginuntegin is based in the village.

== Demographics ==
The population as of the official 2010 census results was 1267, of whom 628 were male and 639 female. This is a reduction on a 2003 estimate by Red Cross Chukotka as 1,419, of which 1,288 were indigenous peoples.

== Transport ==
The village of Lorino is linked to Lavrentiya by a 40 kilometers (25 mi) unpaved road. There is, however, a small number of roads within the settlement including:

- Улица Гагарина (Ulitsa Gagarina, lit. Gagarin Street)
- Улица Енок (Ulitsa Yenok)
- Улица Ленина (Ulitsa Lenina, lit. Lenin Street)
- Улица Челюскинцев (Ulitsa Chelyuskintsev, lit Chelyuskin Street)
- Улица Чукотская (Ulitsa Chukotskaya, lit. Chukotka Street)

== Climate ==
Lorino has a Tundra climate (ET) because the warmest month has an average temperature between 0 °C (32 °F) and 10 °C (50 °F).

Climate data for Lorino
| Month | Jan | Feb | Mar | Apr | May | Jun | Jul | Aug | Sep | Oct | Nov | Dec | Year |
|---|---|---|---|---|---|---|---|---|---|---|---|---|---|
| Record high °C (°F) | 4.7 (40.5) | 5.5 (41.9) | 3.9 (39.0) | 6.4 (43.5) | 10.5 (50.9) | 18.4 (65.1) | 22.7 (72.9) | 22.0 (71.6) | 16.3 (61.3) | 12.0 (53.6) | 8.7 (47.7) | 10.0 (50.0) | 22.7 (72.9) |
| Mean daily maximum °C (°F) | −17.9 (−0.2) | −16.7 (1.9) | −15.8 (3.6) | −9.1 (15.6) | −0.7 (30.7) | 5.6 (42.1) | 10.0 (50.0) | 9.2 (48.6) | 5.4 (41.7) | 0.5 (32.9) | −4.7 (23.5) | −13.9 (7.0) | −4.0 (24.8) |
| Mean daily minimum °C (°F) | −23.9 (−11.0) | −22.8 (−9.0) | −22.3 (−8.1) | −15.2 (4.6) | −4.6 (23.7) | 1.0 (33.8) | 4.8 (40.6) | 4.8 (40.6) | 2.2 (36.0) | −3.0 (26.6) | −9.8 (14.4) | −19.0 (−2.2) | −9.0 (15.8) |
| Record low °C (°F) | −44.1 (−47.4) | −41.5 (−42.7) | −41.4 (−42.5) | −31.1 (−24.0) | −24.5 (−12.1) | −5.6 (21.9) | −4.7 (23.5) | −2.7 (27.1) | −6.1 (21.0) | −19.9 (−3.8) | −33.6 (−28.5) | −41.2 (−42.2) | −44.1 (−47.4) |
| Average rainfall mm (inches) | 19.0 (0.75) | 20.0 (0.79) | 13.8 (0.54) | 18.1 (0.71) | 18.8 (0.74) | 15.1 (0.59) | 40.4 (1.59) | 46.2 (1.82) | 35.9 (1.41) | 45.4 (1.79) | 28.8 (1.13) | 18.4 (0.72) | 319.9 (12.59) |
| Average snowy days | 14 | 12 | 11 | 15 | 13 | 3 | 0 | 0 | 4 | 17 | 20 | 15 | 124 |

== Gallery ==
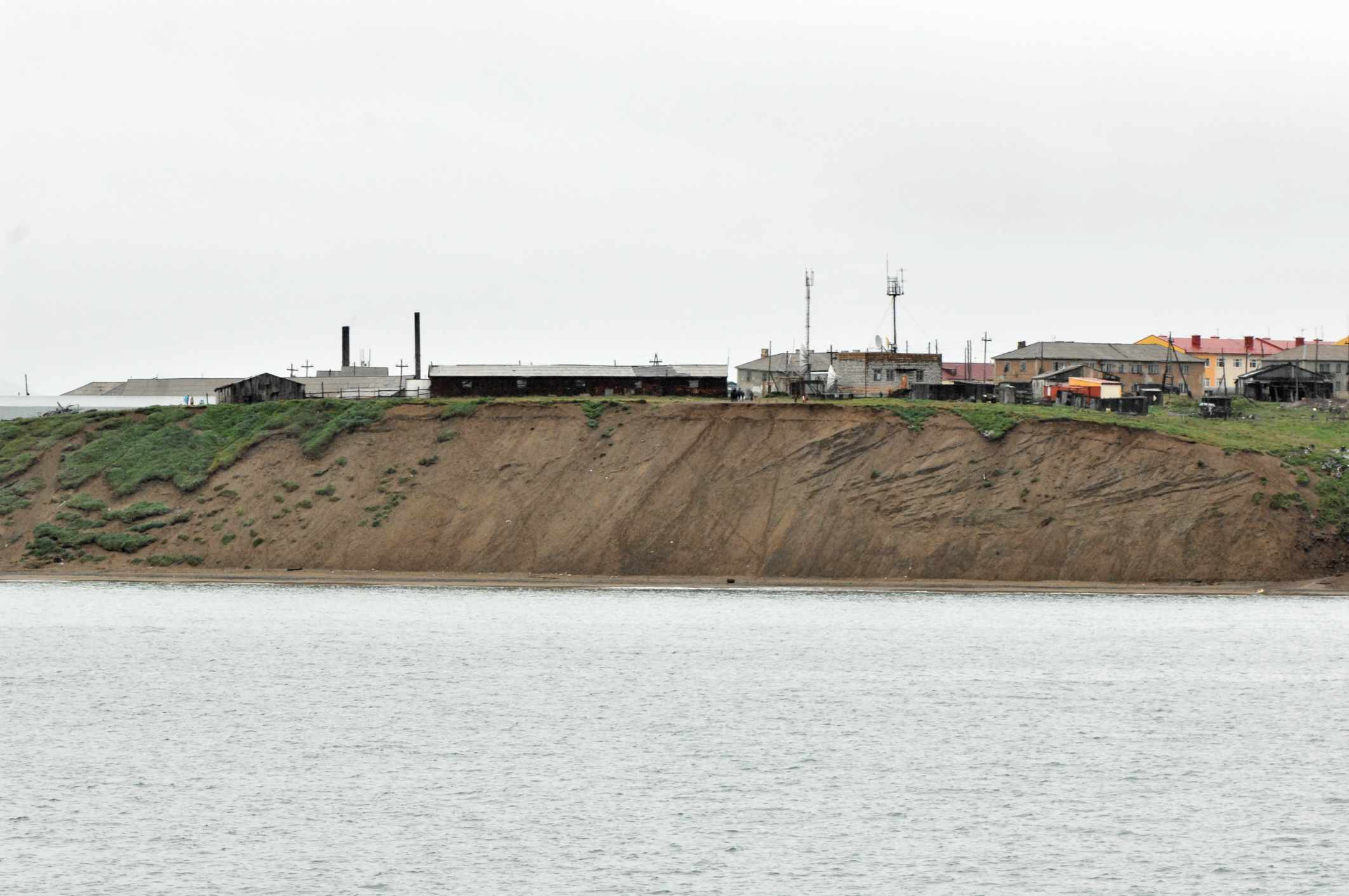
Lorino (Bering Sea, Russia, 65°30’N, 171°42’W)

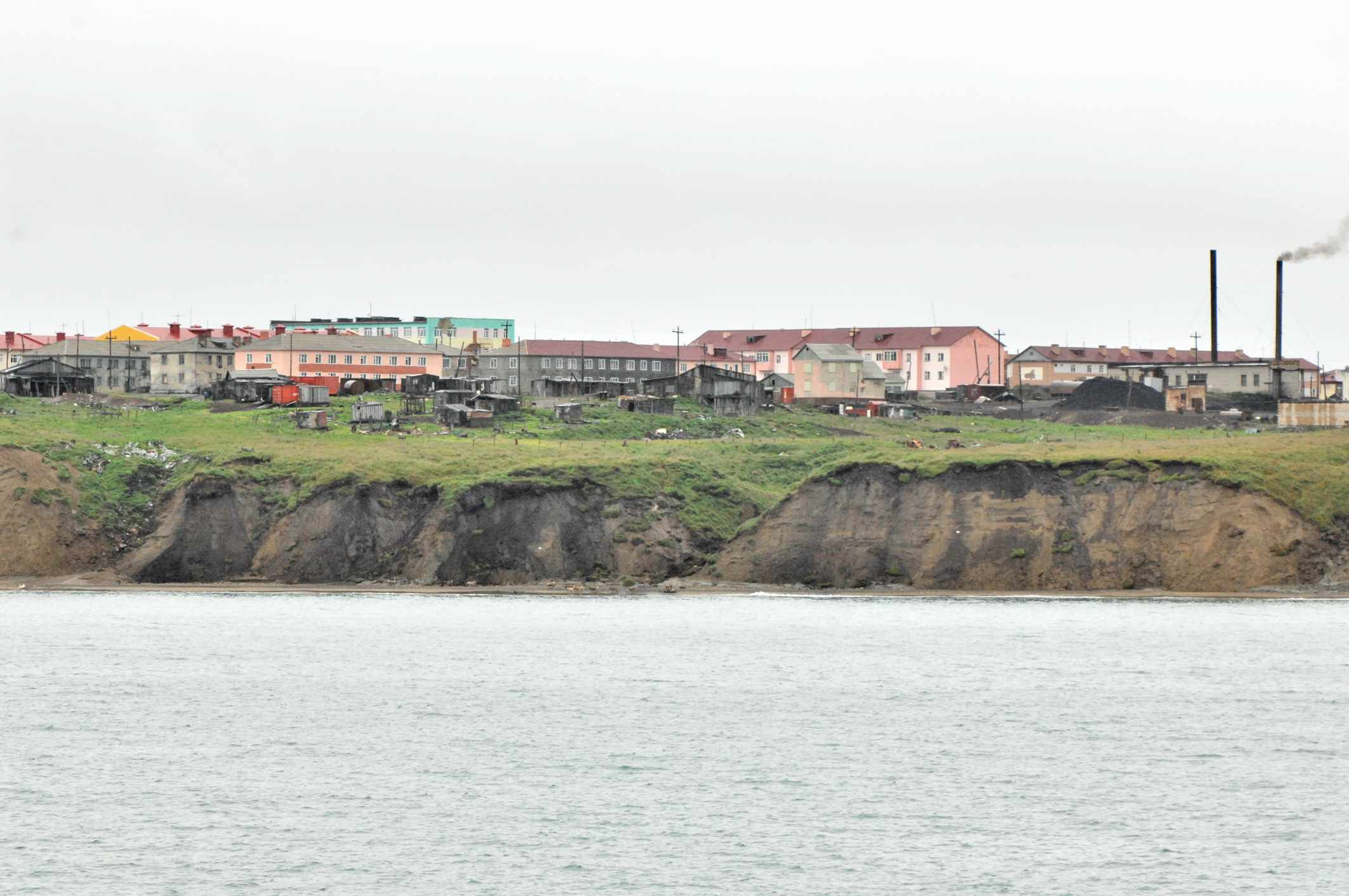
Lorino

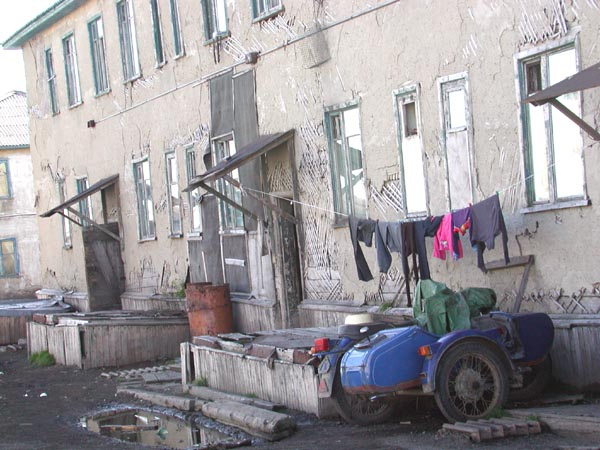
Soviet era apartments
in Lorino

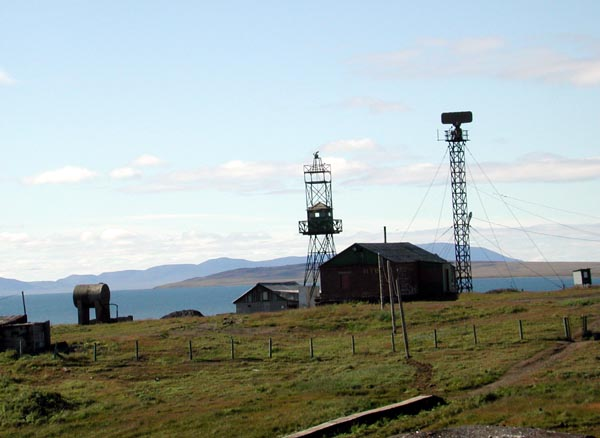
Soviet era guard tower

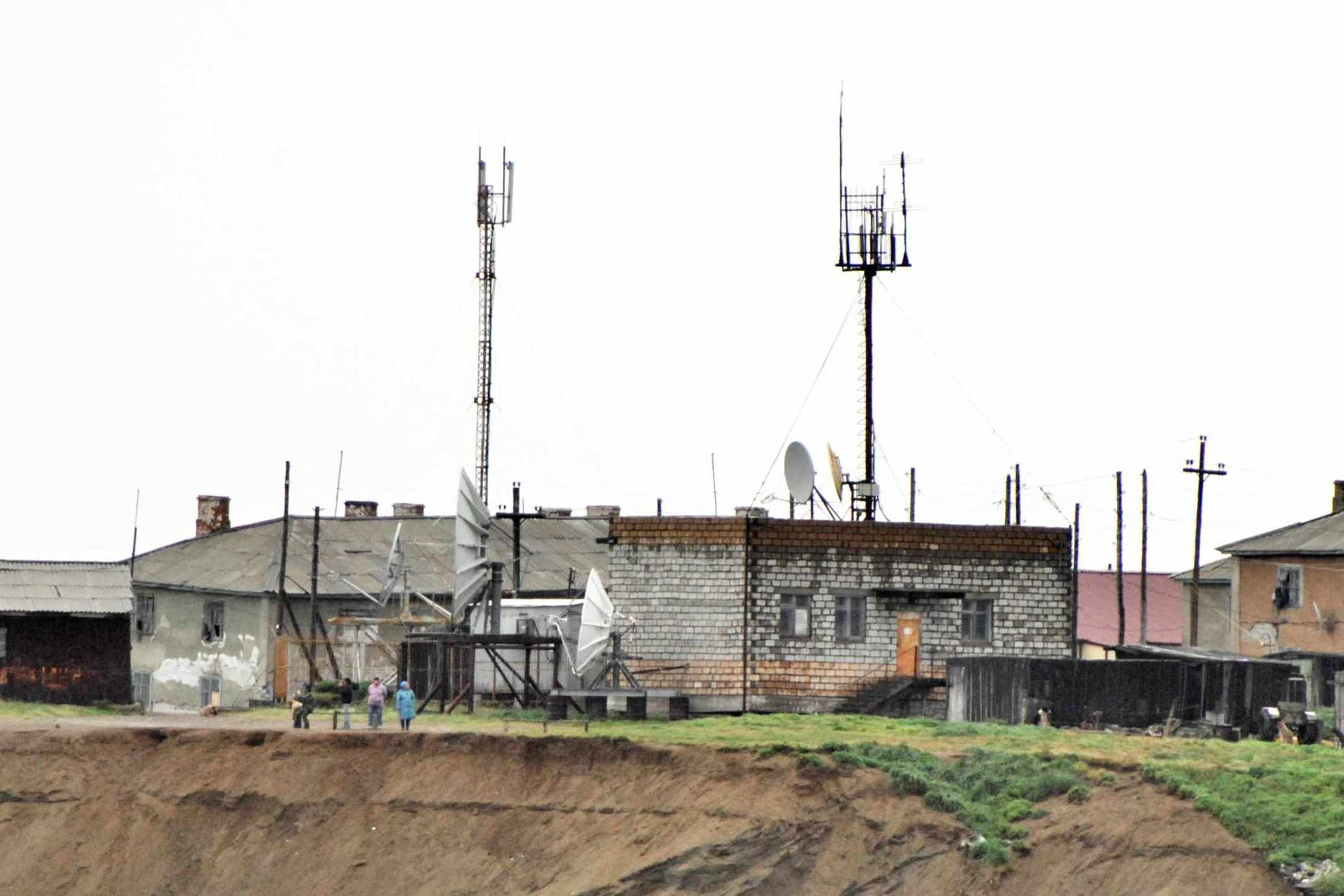
Lorino,
Telecommunication station

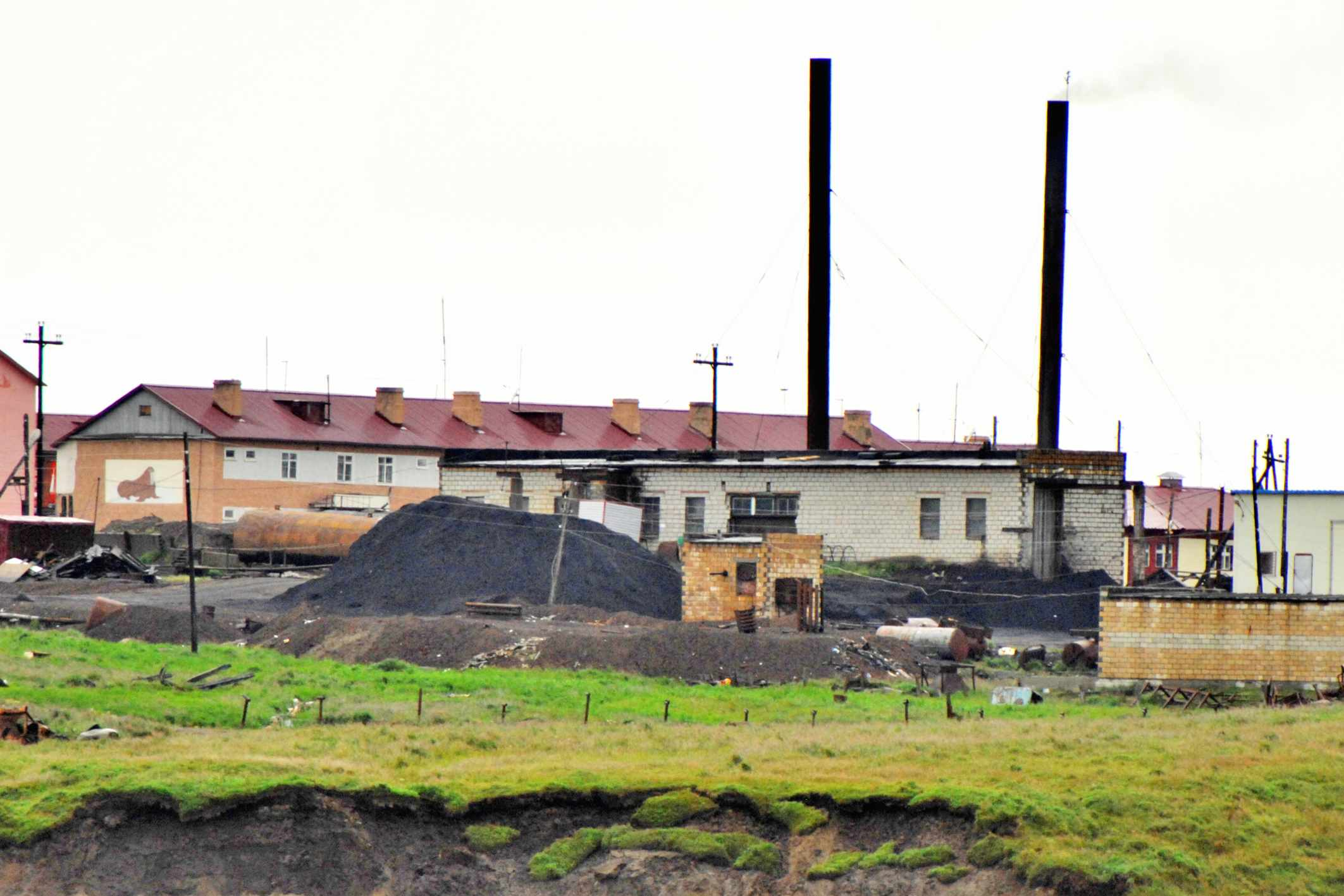
Lorino,
Power station

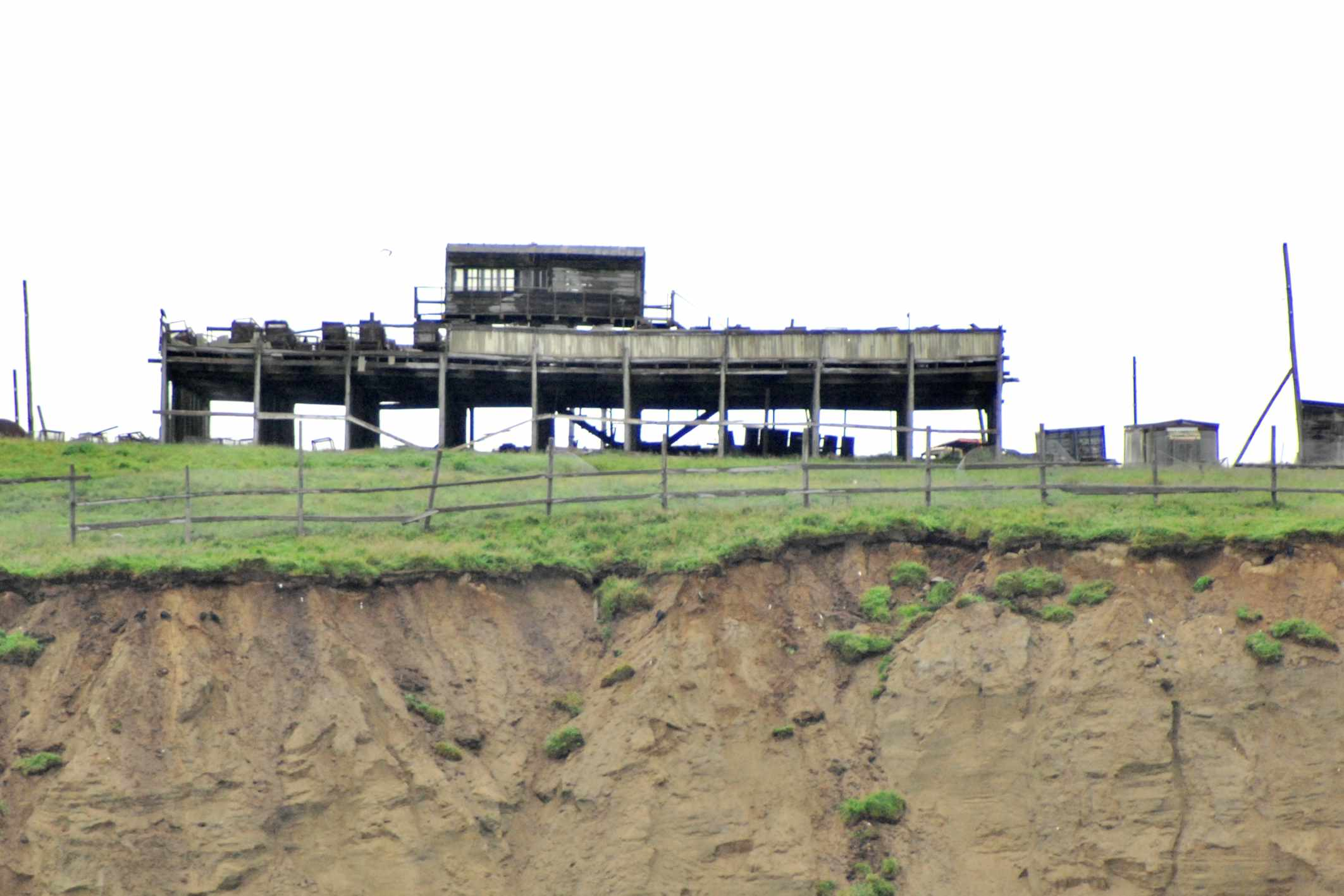
Lorino,
former fox farm

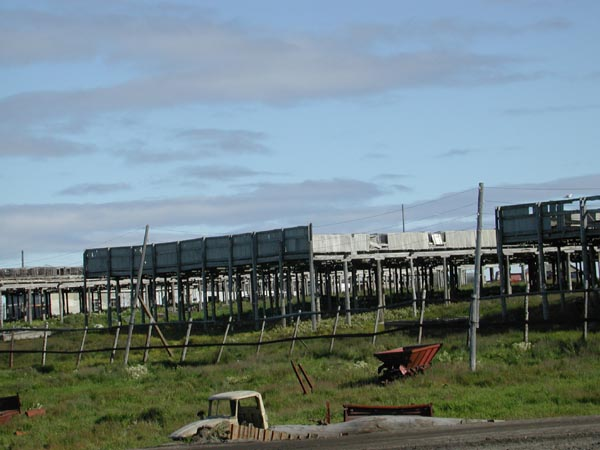
Fox farm (details)

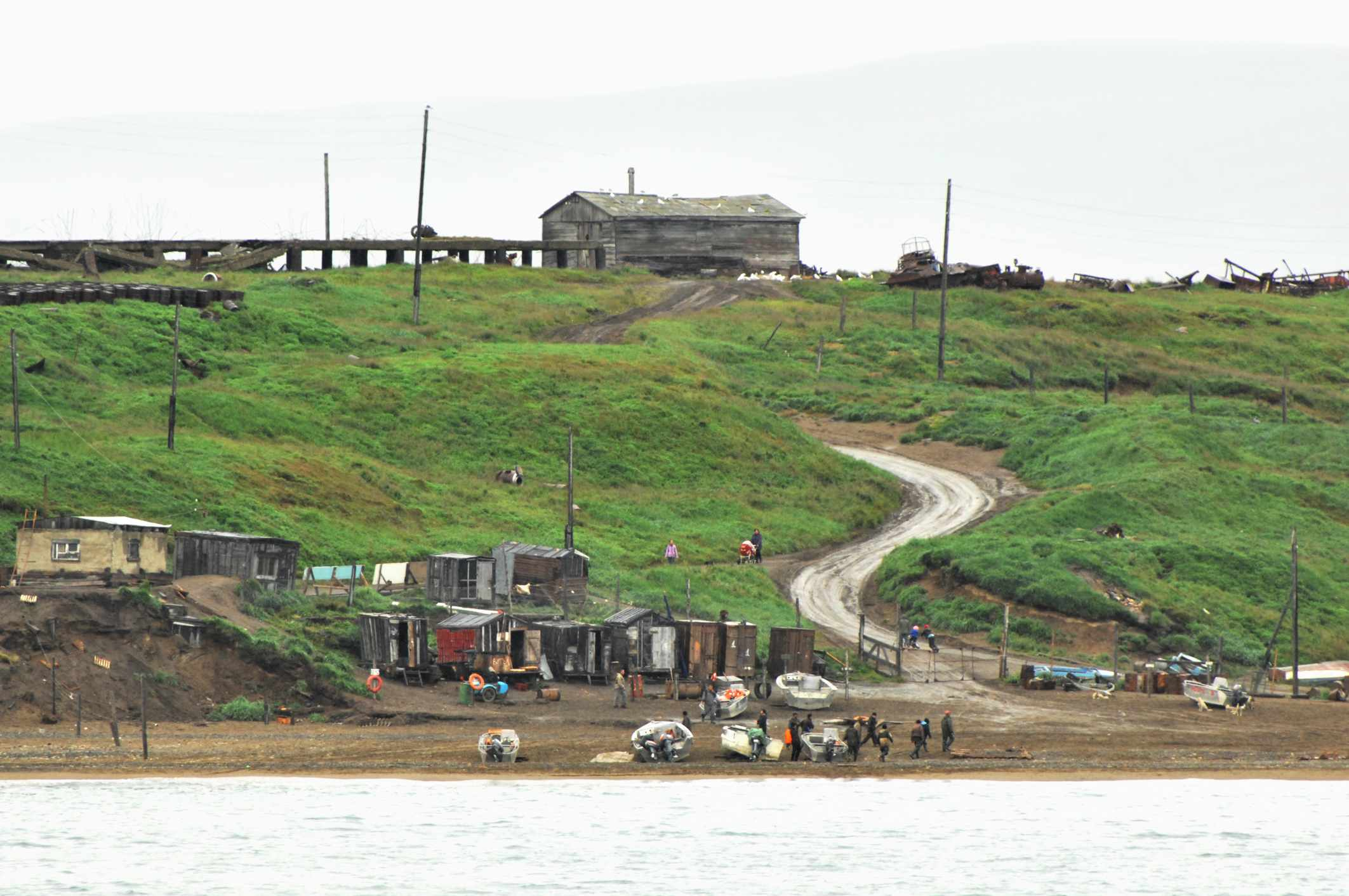
Lorino,
boat landing pad with road to community center

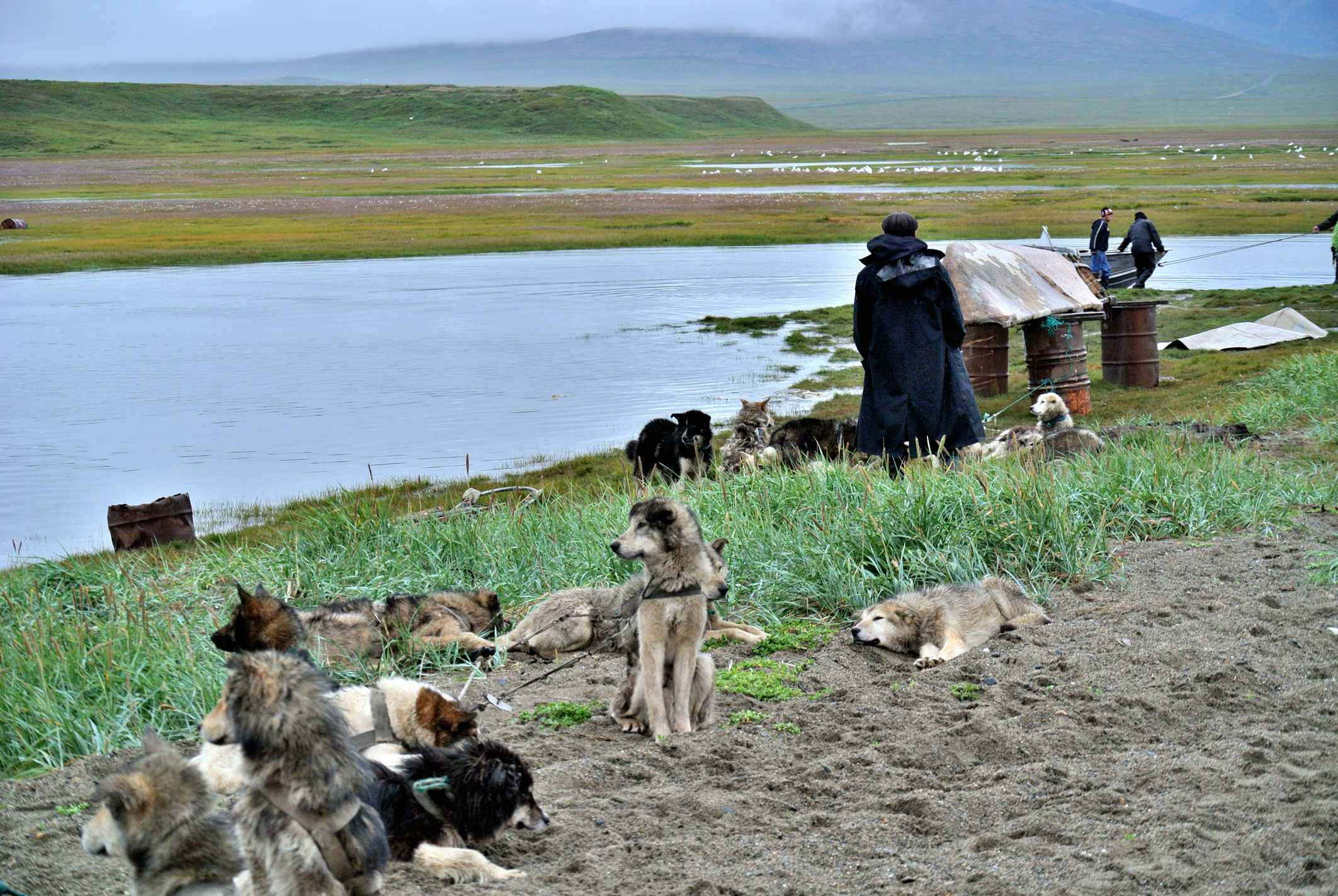
Lorino,
sled dogs teams at the beach

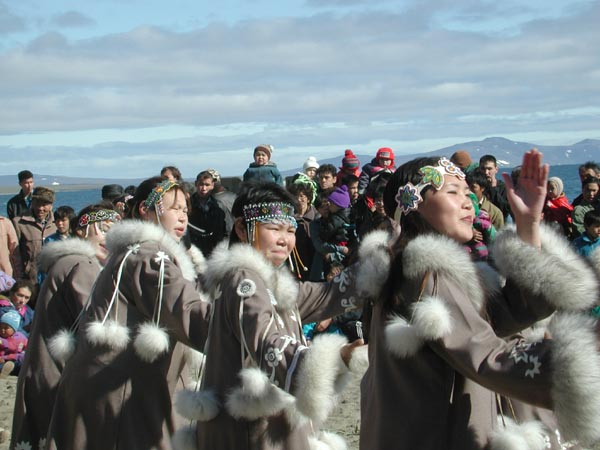
Female dancers

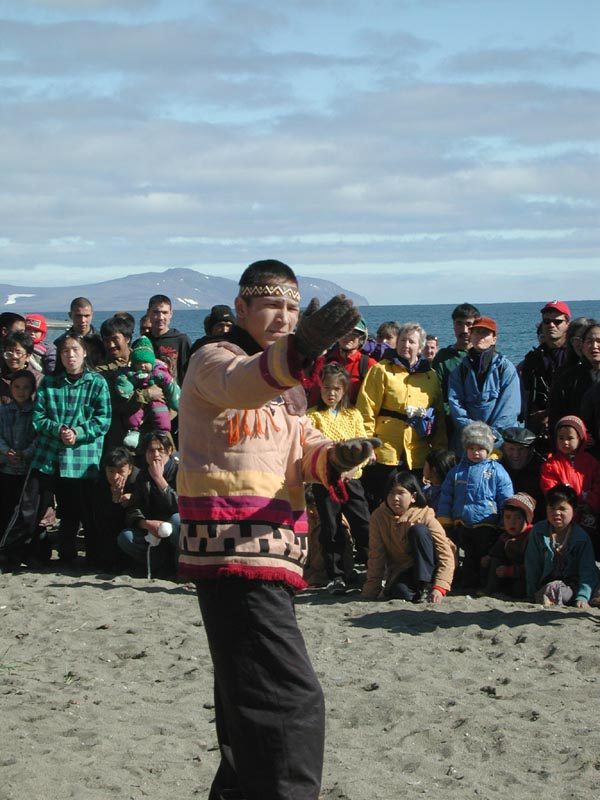
Boy in traditional costume

== See also ==
- List of inhabited localities in Chukotsky District
