= Lavrentiya =

Lavrentiya Лаврентия Ӄышы (Yupik)
- Selo
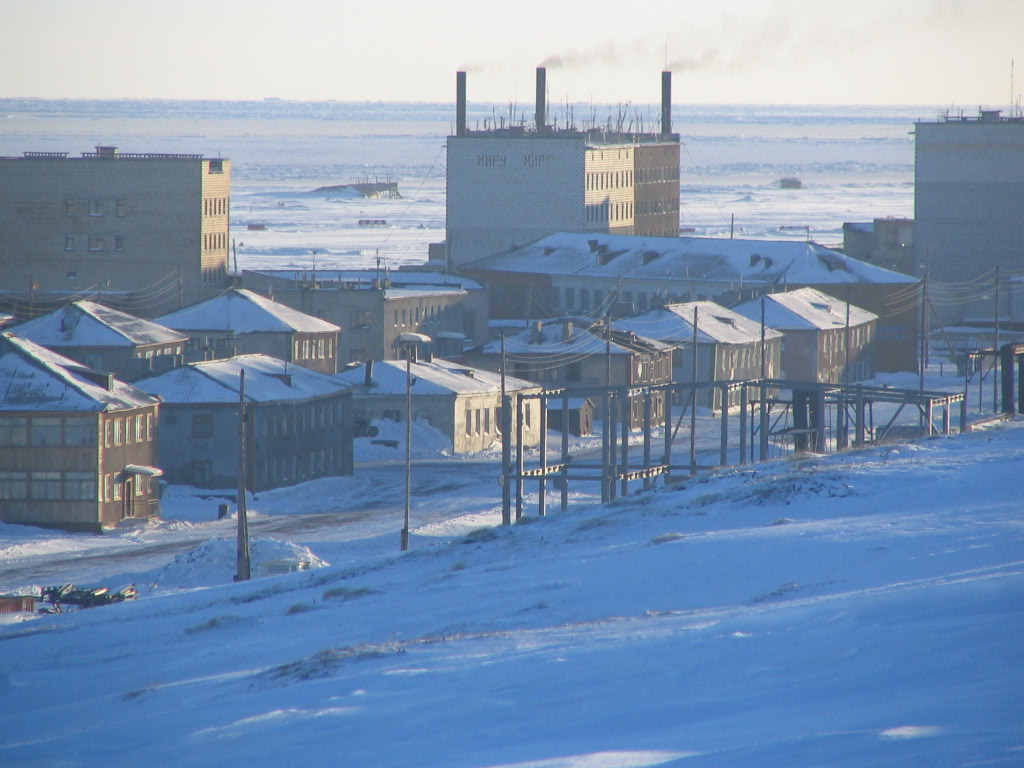
- Lavrentiya, Chukotsky District

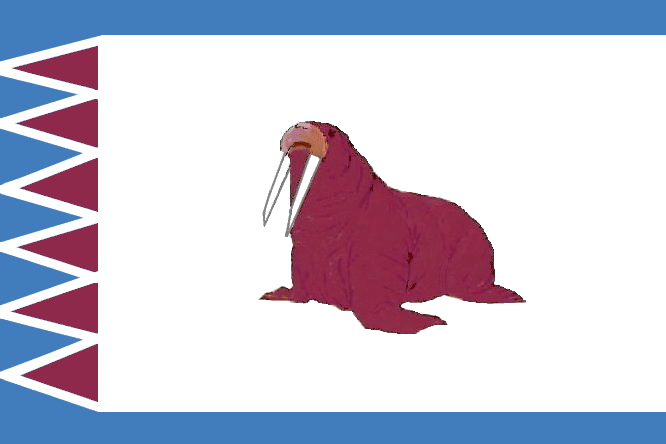
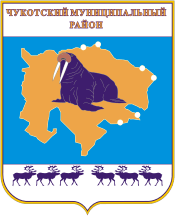
- Flag Coat of arms
- Interactive map of Lavrentiya
- Location of Lavrentiya Lavrentiya (Chukotka Autonomous Okrug)
- Coordinates: 65°35′03″N 170°59′20″W
- Country: Russia
- Federal subject: Chukotka Autonomous Okrug
- Administrative district: Chukotsky District
- Founded: 1927

Population (2010 Census)
  - Total: 1,459
  - Estimate (January 2018): 1,185 (−18.8%)

Administrative status
  - Capital of: Chukotsky District

Municipal status
  - Municipal district: Chukotsky Municipal District
  - Rural settlement: Lavrentiya Rural Settlement
  - Capital of: Chukotsky Municipal District
- Time zone: UTC+12 (MSK+9)
- Postal code: 689300
- Dialing code: +7 42736
- OKTMO ID: 77633420101

Lavrentiya (Russian: Лавре́нтия, Yupik: Ӄышы; Chukchi: Ӄытрын, Ḳytryn; Naukan: Qerre; Inupiaq: Kesrreq or Kisrriq) is a rural locality (a selo) and the administrative center of Chukotsky District of Chukotka Autonomous Okrug, Russia, located on Lavrentiya Bay, close to the Bering Strait. Population: 1,459 (2010 census); 1,333 (2002 census); 3,012 (1989 Soviet census). Lavrentiya is the only district administrative center in the whole autonomous okrug that does not have urban status; it accounts for 30.2% of the district's total population. Located in Lavrentiya is the easternmost airport on the world map, the Lavrentiya Airport, UHML.

== History ==
It is situated on Lavrentiya Bay, named by Captain James Cook who arrived in the bay on the feast day of Saint Lawrence in 1778. The village itself was founded in 1928 (although some sources suggest 1927). By 1928 a Kultbaza (a semi-permanent cultural base established by the Soviet Union in rural areas to ensure the ideological education of local indigenous inhabitants) had been established in the area and by 1930 the settlement was sufficient that it was appointed as the administrative centre of Chukotsky District. This appointment was later transferred to Uelen but administrative responsibilities returned to Lavrentiya in 1942.^{,}

Lavrentiya was founded as a village in 1928, when a Chukchi Kultbaza, a communist run cultural and political base was established. The Chukchi Kultbaza connected the various administrative and economic institutions of the region to promote the consolidation of Soviet power. A steamer with timber for the construction of houses and other buildings entered the Gulf of Lawrence in August 1927 with workers on board. By the autumn of 1928 Kultbaza consisted of a series of buildings: a veterinary station, repair shop for motor vehicles and appliances, hospital, warehouse, homes, factories, boarding schools and three residential houses. Following the formation of the village, in December 1930 the Kultbaza in Lavrentiya became the administrative centre for the Chukotka National District (not to be confused with the current Chukotsky District), though in April 1932, this was switched to Anadyr. In December 1933, at a meeting of the District CPSU, the question was raised in Lavrentiya concerning the potential transfer of district institutions for what is now Chukotsky District to Lavrentiya from their current position in Uelen. Transfer ultimately took place but was slow. A final decision was not made until late in 1940. The first institutions did not actually move until 1942 and, because of World War 2, were not completed until 1946. With the shift in district administration to Lavrentiya, a new airfield was built and during World War 2 this was used for Lend-Lease flights.

In 1955, a regular air route was established between Lavrentiya and Uelen, and in 1958, a number of Yupik who lived at Naukan were relocated to the village following the closure of Naukan.

== Administrative and municipal status ==
Within the framework of municipal divisions, Lavrentiya is subordinated to Chukotsky Municipal District and incorporated as Lavrentiya Rural Settlement.

== Culture ==
There is an annual Whale and Skin Boat Regatta held in the village every year.

The museum in the village, dedicated to indigenous history and culture, achieved national status in 1994 and contains exhibits from Uelen and Ekven, including a number of "winged objects", butterfly-shaped instruments carved from walrus tusk, which initially provoked confusion over their original purpose. Initial opinion was divided, with some thinking they were part of a staff, others that they had religious significance and others still thinking that they were purely aesthetic. However, investigation into the aerodynamics of the objects found that their shape had much in common with modern aircraft wings and it was proposed that these objects were in fact to assist in the flight of harpoons, thinking confirmed by the discovery of a harpoon with a "winged object" still attached to it. It is not clear why such a useful tool fell out of use amongst the indigenous peoples.

Historically, one of the most significant cultural exports from the village was the indigenous ensemble Yeti (Russian: Етти) which was led in 1976 by the Yupik woman M. S. Glukhikh, who now leads the national ensemble White Sail (Russian: Белый парус).

The village also contains the Church of the Archangel Michael.

== Economy ==
Lavrentiya, as the administrative centre of the district contains the majority of the key district facilities including a branch of the district court and public prosecutor, hospital, post office, school, telecomms, pharmacy and is the regional headquarters for the airline Chukotavia.

== Transport ==
Lavrentiya is 650 kilometres (404 mi) from Anadyr.

=== Air ===
The village is served by Lavrentiya Airport.

=== Roadways ===
The village of Lorino is linked to Lavrentiya by a 40 kilometers (25 mi) unpaved road. Other than this short road, Lavrentiya, despite being the administrative centre of the district, is not linked to any other part of the world by road. However, the settlement has a small number of roads within it.

== Climate ==
Lavrentiya has an arctic tundra climate (Köppen climate classification ET) because the warmest month has an average temperature between 0 and +10 °C (32 and 50 °F).

Climate data for Lavrentiya
Month	Jan	Feb	Mar	Apr	May	Jun	Jul	Aug	Sep	Oct	Nov	Dec	Year
Mean daily maximum °C (°F)	−13.2 (8.2)	−15.6 (3.9)	−14.2 (6.4)	−7.9 (17.8)	−0.1 (31.8)	5.5 (41.9)	9.4 (48.9)	9.0 (48.2)	5.7 (42.3)	0.5 (32.9)	−4.7 (23.5)	−12.1 (10.2)	−3.1 (26.4)
Daily mean °C (°F)	−16.9 (1.6)	−19.2 (−2.6)	−18.1 (−0.6)	−11.7 (10.9)	−2.8 (27.0)	2.7 (36.9)	6.6 (43.9)	6.5 (43.7)	3.6 (38.5)	−1.6 (29.1)	−7.6 (18.3)	−15.4 (4.3)	−6.2 (20.8)
Mean daily minimum °C (°F)	−20.5 (−4.9)	−22.8 (−9.0)	−21.9 (−7.4)	−15.5 (4.1)	−5.5 (22.1)	−0.1 (31.8)	3.9 (39.0)	4.1 (39.4)	1.5 (34.7)	−3.7 (25.3)	−10.4 (13.3)	−18.7 (−1.7)	−9.1 (15.6)
Average precipitation mm (inches)	23 (0.9)	17 (0.7)	17 (0.7)	17 (0.7)	16 (0.6)	21 (0.8)	38 (1.5)	57 (2.2)	47 (1.9)	35 (1.4)	29 (1.1)	24 (0.9)	341 (13.4)

== See also ==
- List of inhabited localities in Chukotsky District
- Koolen
