= Chukotsky District =

Chukotsky District Чукотский район (Russian)
- District
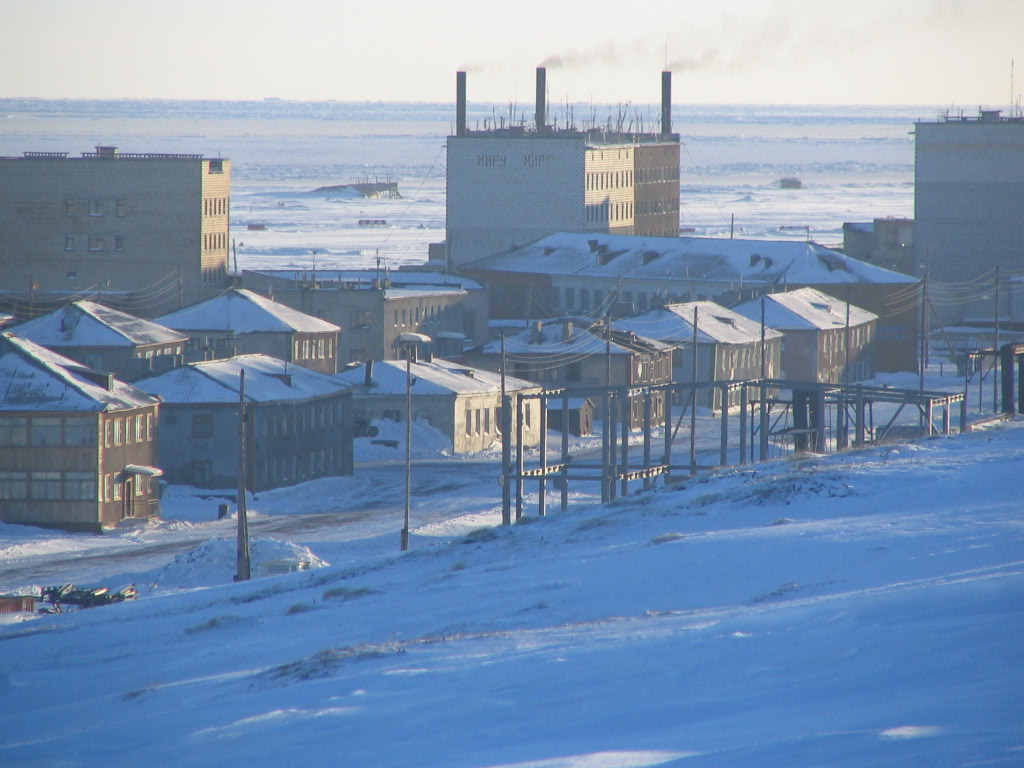
- Lavrentiya, Chukotsky District

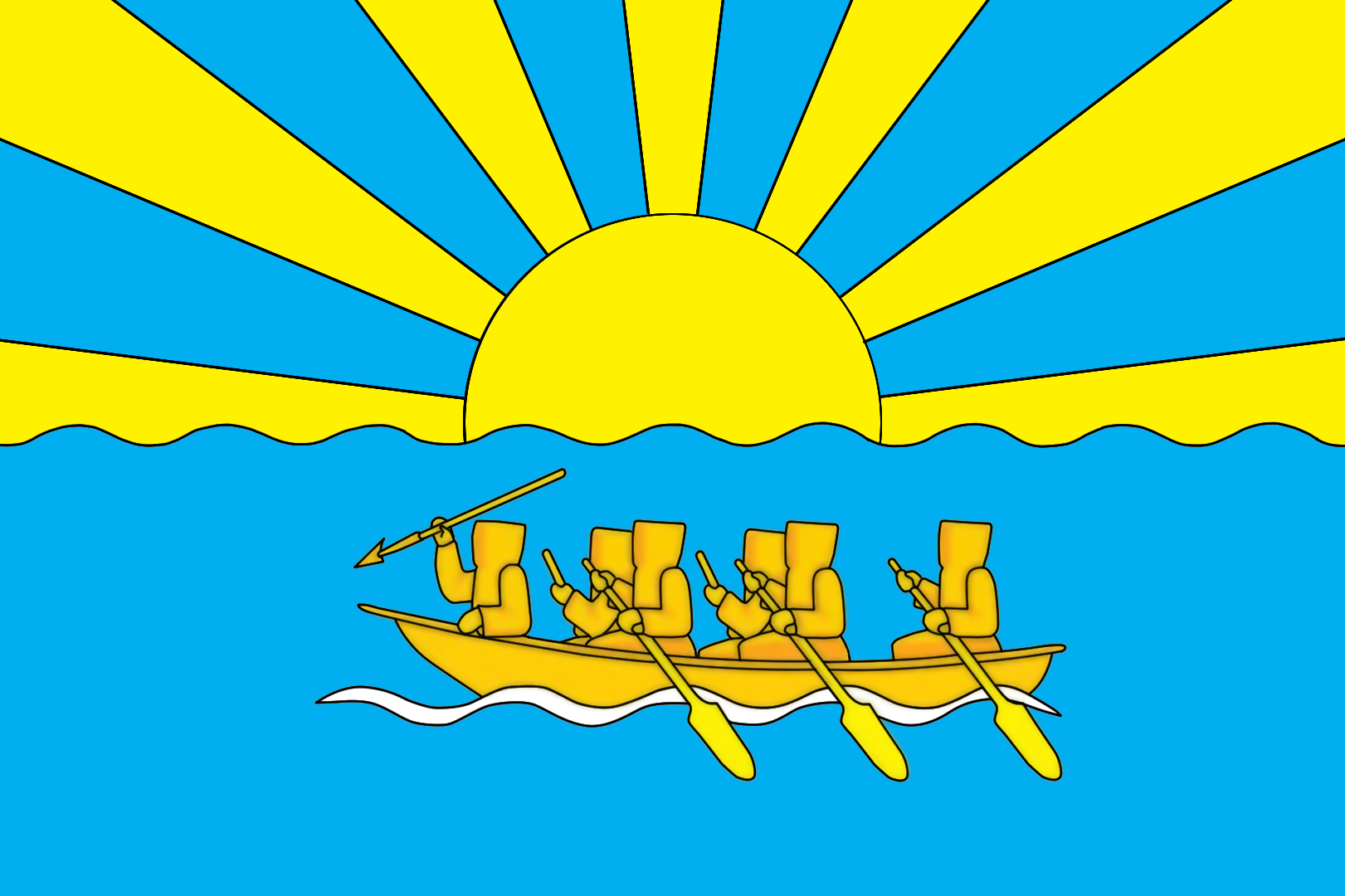
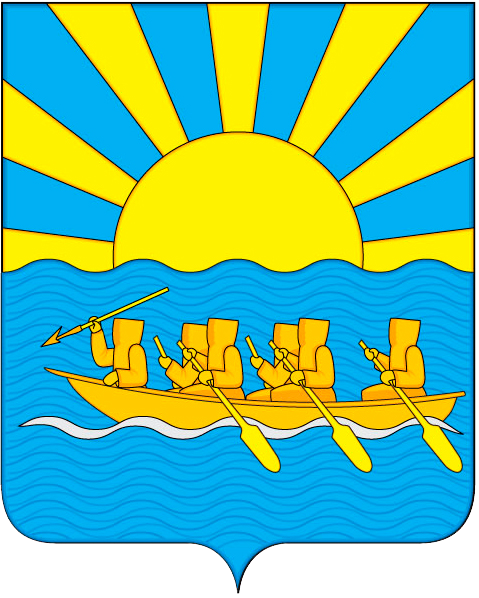
- Flag Coat of arms
- Location of Chukotsky District in Chukotka Autonomous Okrug
- Coordinates: 66°18′46″N 172°25′04″W
- Country: Russia
- Federal subject: Chukotka Autonomous Okrug
- Established: 1927----MISCELLANEA----
- Administrative center: Lavrentiya

Government
  - Type: Local government
  - Body: Council of Deputies
  - Head: Mikhail Zelensky

Area
  - Total: 30,700 km^{2} (11,900 sq mi)

Population (2010 Census)
  - Total: 4,838
  - Estimate (January 2016): 4,344
  - Density: 0.158/km^{2} (0.408/sq mi)
  - Urban: 0%
  - Rural: 100%

Administrative structure
  - Inhabited localities: 6 rural localities

Municipal structure
  - Municipally incorporated as: Chukotsky Municipal District
  - Municipal divisions: 0 urban settlements, 6 rural settlements
- Time zone: UTC+12 (MSK+9)
- OKTMO ID: 77633000
- Holiday: ----ADMINISTRATIVE STATUS----
- Website: http://www.chukotraion.ru

Chukotsky District (Russian: Чуко́тский райо́н, Čukótskiy rayón; Chukchi: Чукоткакэн район, Čukotkakèn rajon) is an administrative and municipal district (raion), one of the six in Chukotka Autonomous Okrug, Russia. It is the easternmost district of the autonomous okrug and Russia, and the closest part of Russia to the United States. It borders with the Chukchi Sea in the north, the Bering Sea in the east, Providensky District in the south, and the Kolyuchinskaya Bay in the west. The area of the district is 30,700 square kilometers (11,900 sq mi). Its administrative center is the rural locality (a selo) of Lavrentiya. Population: 4,995 (2021 census); 4,838 (2010 census); 4,541 (2002 census); 6,878 (1989 Soviet census). The population of Lavrentiya accounts for 30.2% of the district's total population.

The district is populated mainly by indigenous peoples, the majority being either Chukchi or Yupik. The sparse nature of the population means that this is the only district in the autonomous okrug without any urban localities. The selo of Uelen is located in the district, which is a focal point for indigenous artwork of the region as a whole and the birthplace of Yuri Rytkheu, the first internationally recognized Chukchi writer.

== Geography ==
Chukotsky District covers the northern half of the Chukchi Peninsula, at the northeastern tip of Eurasia. Prior to 1957, the district was substantially larger, as its territory covered not only present-day Chukotsky District, but also present-day Providensky District, as well as a substantial territory now included in Iultinsky District.

Uelen—the easternmost settlement on the Eurasian landmass and famous for its whale bone carving—is located on the district's territory. It also features the most easterly point on the Eurasian landmass: Cape Dezhnev, named after Russian navigator Semyon Dezhnyov. It was formerly the setting for a Dalstroy gulag site and the alleged starting point for Clemens Forell's epic journey in the novel As Far as My Feet Will Carry Me.

The district also includes Big Diomede Island, sometimes called Tomorrow Island since it is twenty-one hours ahead of its partner Little Diomede, despite being only 1 kilometer (0.62 mi) away across the sea.

Lakes Koolen and Ioni are located in the district.

== History ==
For the indigenous peoples, life has been rather static for the last few millennia, judging from archaeological excavations. The region contains about eighty archaeological and historical sites, many of which are in the vicinity of present-day villages.

From the view of non-indigenous people, the area now known as Chukotsky District was a formidable place and was only gradually and tentatively explored in comparison with other areas of Chukotka. Semyon Dezhnyov and his Cossacks nearly had their entire fleet destroyed as they attempted to sail around the cape that would ultimately bear his name on their way to the Anadyr River in the mid-17th century. Eighty years later, Vitus Bering sailed through the strait which now bears his name, and five years later, the first maps of the coastline were drawn by the Second Kamchatka Expedition. However, it was not for a further fifty-five years that the coast of the region was visited by James Cook, and a permanent Russian presence in the form of trading posts in any of the villages was not established until the early 1900s.

Prior to the establishment of the current administrative arrangement (with Chukotsky District as it is now being founded in 1927), Chukotsky Uyezd was founded with its seat in Provideniya Bay in 1909, and in 1912, the seat was moved to Uelen with one of the first schools in the area opening there four years later.

== Historical sites in Chukotsky District ==
There were once many indigenous Yupik settlements throughout Chukotsky District; however, at the end of the 1950s, the Soviet government began a substantial program of relocation, closing a large number of indigenous settlements and relocating their inhabitants to a small number of villages. These settlements were destined to become local hubs and model Soviet villages Following the dissolution of the Soviet Union, local indigenous people rely more heavily on their traditional hunting skills and are considering the resettling a number of these villages due to the lack of centralized relocation. The table below outlines some of the more important historical localities within the district.

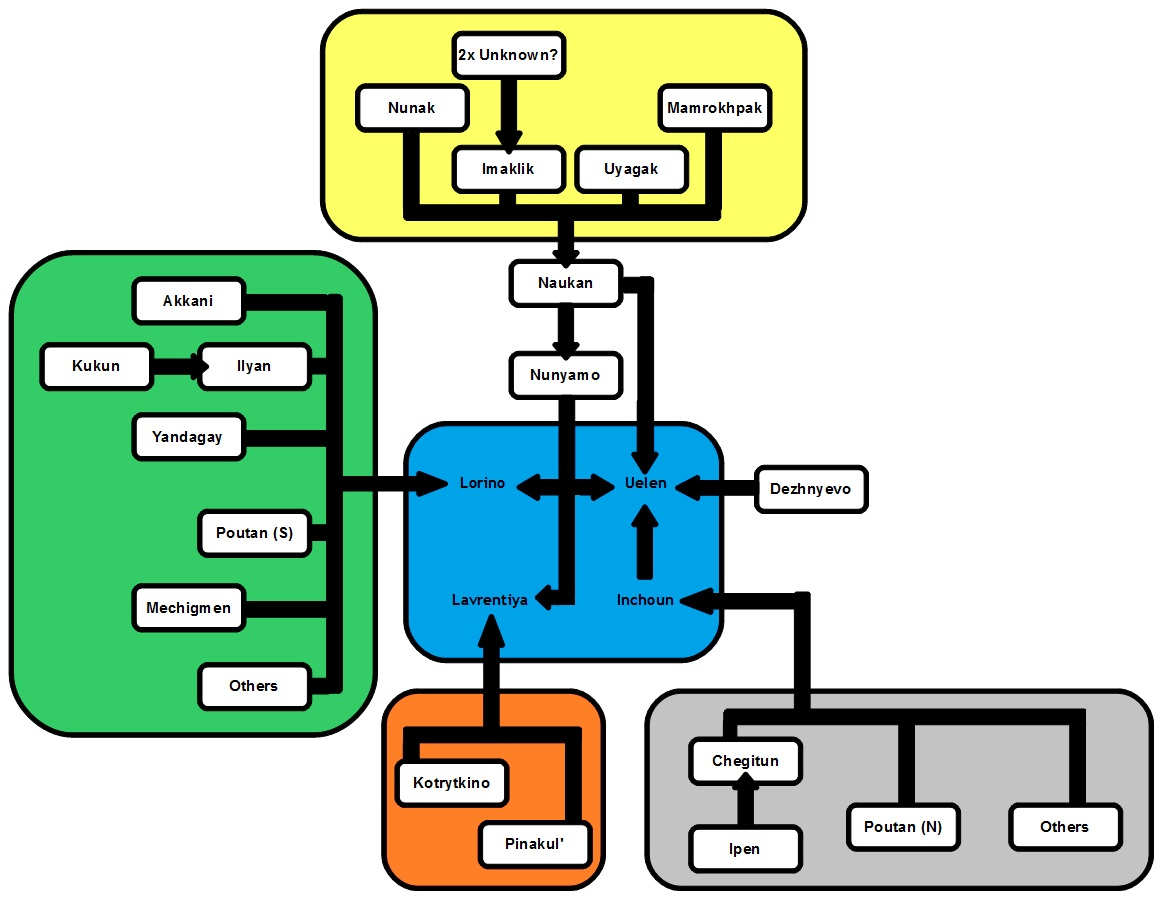
Chukotsky District Relocations. This diagram illustrates localities with indigenous population which were closed in the Soviet era and shows the destinations where the residents moved upon abandonment. This chart summarizes information given by Lyudmila Bogoslovskaya in Beringia Notes 2.2, bar Imaklik (Big Diomede), which is from Michael Krauss. The diagram is not exhaustive, it merely outlines those moves noted by the sources.

List of abolished localities in Chukotsky District
Locality name	Comments
Аккани/Akkani (Russian)	Also known as Ыӄынин/Yqynin (Chukchi) and Ыӄыт/Yqyt (Yupik) (lit. seven yurts in Yupik & cold/chilly in Chukchi). In 1927, it had a population of eighty-four. This had grown to 165 by 1943 and shrunk to 153 by 1950. In the 1960s, it was abolished and its population moved to Lorino. The hunting camp of Akkani (two houses, 6 cabins) has been temporarily inhabited by hunters and their families from Lorino since the closure of the Akkani settlement in the 1960s; mostly used during the spring and summer hunting season. Sea mammal hunting site: Protected cove for boat landing; bluff at a cape overlooking two bays; the surroundings of the Akkani cape are ice free early and late in the season; close to a preferred walrus watch-out west of Cape Kriguygu; close to berry and plant gathering areas.
Чегитун/Chegitun (Russian)	Also known as Чегтун/Chegtun (Chukchi) and Сахтуӄ/Sahtuq (Yupik) (lit. straighten in Yupik, from сахтуӄ "straightening up", сахтаӄа "straightens"). Its population grew from 73 in 1927 to 124 (including four non-native people) in 1943. It was abolished by 1957 at the earliest, when the inhabitants were moved to Inchoun.
Дежнёво/Dezhnyovo (Russian)	Also called Каӈисӄаӄ/Kaṇisqaq (Yupik; from каӈиӄ "bay") and Кэӈисӄун/Kėṇisqun (Chukchi), old Chukchi Valkatlian, Enmytagin, and Mikhaylovsky throughout its history. During Soviet times, until its closure in 1951, Dezhnyovo was an important outpost of the Uelen state farm (linked by tractor transport). It was used as a border guard station until 1994. Several remaining cabins are occasionally used by hunting parties. The sheltered bay presents an excellent sea mammal hunting location. The village was formed in 1902 around a trading post run by Olaf Svenson (North-East Siberia Co.) and the Karayev Brothers (Churin & Co.) until 1931, renamed 'Red Star' but closed 1951 with the population moved to Uelen.
Катрыткино/Katrytkino (Russian)	Also known as Ӄытрыткын/Qytrytkyn (Chukchi), Kytryn, and Ӄытжын/Qytžyn (Yupik). It was extremely close to Lorino and was eventually absorbed by it.
Ильян/Ilyan (Russian)	Also known as Йиԓен/Yiḷen (Chukchi; from йиԓьэйиԓ "arctic ground squirrel"). Another village in the Mechigmen Bay area Like Mechigmen, it was established in order to hunt Gray whales.
Кукуни/Kukuni (Russian)	Also known as Кукъун/Kukʺun (Chukchi; from кукъу/кокъо "edible plant") and Кукун/Kukun. Kukun is a village analogous to Ilyan.
Мечигмен/Mechigmen (Russian)	Also known as Мэчивмэн/Mėchivmėn (Chukchi; lit. "bay bar", "bay"). A small locality on the north shore of the Mechigmen Bay. In 1927, it had a population of twenty-seven, though it is not certain whether this count is of the population of Mechgmen proper or of Raupelian (also known as Rawpialaane and Ravpelian) a village on the northern spit of the Mechigmen Bay, across the water from the village of Masik in Providensky District. By 1950, it was under the jurisdiction of Lorinsky Selsoviet.
Мыткувԓен/Mytkuvḷen (Chukchi)	Also called Мытӄуӷлаӄ/Mytquǥlaq (Yupik) and Миткулино/Mitkulino (Russian) it was a small locality of 27 residents in 1927. Its name derives from the Chukchi word "Mytkuvḷen", meaning "much oil/blubber" (from мыт- "grease", кув- "many"), due to the fact that the coast here has a concave bend where the current washes ashore dead whales and walrus which were used for oil and dog food.
Наукан/Naukan (Russian)	Also known as Нууӄан/Nuuqan (Chukchi) and Нывуӄаӄ/Nyvuqaq (Yupik). Its name derives from the Naukan Yupik word "Nyvuqaq", meaning "cespitose" (from нывуӄ "turf, sod"). This village was a cultural center of the Naukan Yupik and developed its own branch of the language (Naukan Yupik). Naukan, situated on the easternmost point of the Chukotsky Peninsula, was a key trading post linking those Chukchi who engaged in reindeer herding in the tundra and American sea hunters. The Chukchi herders provided meat and skins, while their Alaskan partners provided blubber and American goods. In 1947, Naukan received the families resettled from Ratmanov (Big Diomede). In 2004 an orthodox cross was erected next to Deshnov’s monument. Warm micro-climate: People from Uelen occasionally go to Naukan to gather wild onions. It was a major center of Eskimo culture until closed in 1958 by Soviet authorities, people moved to Nunyamo, Pinakul, Lavrentiya, Uelen.
Нунямо/Nunyamo (Russian)	Also known as Нунама/Nunama (Yupik) and Нунъэмун/Nunʺėmun (Chukchi), this locality was populated solely by Chukchi until 1958, having been previously a Yupik village in the 18th century as evidenced by old ruins and archeological finds. In 1958, following the closure of Naukan, the village became a mixed Chukchi/Yupik settlement until 1970, when the population were moved to Lorino, Lavrentiya, and Uelen.
Поутэн/Pouten (Russian)	Also known as Пиӽтуӄ/Piḥtuq (Yupik) and Пуʼутэн/Puʼutėn (Chukchi). Its name derives from the Chukchi word пуэʼпуй or пуйъэпуй (puėʼpuy/puyʺėpuy), meaning "soot". This is a site of two villages (Pouten North and Pouten South) and was occasionally used as a border guard station. In pre-Soviet times, American geologists extracted graphite from shaft mines in the surrounding mountains and the pigments extracted were used by the indigenous population for decoration and ritual activity The site is still used by local people as a stopping point and a shelter on fishing trips. The southern village's population was moved to Lorino, while the northern village's population was moved to Uelen. People from these settlements still use the site as a temporary camp.
Сешан/Seshan (Russian)	Also known as Чечаӈэн/Čečaṇėn (Chukchi) and Сисаӈиӄ/Sisaṇiq (Yupik). Seshan had 114 residents in 1940, all bar one of whom were indigenous. Assumed to have been closed in the 1950s.
Тойгунен/Toygunen (Russian)	Also known as Тойгуӈынӷуӄ/Toyguṇynǥuq (Yupik) and Тойвыӈынвын/Toyvyṇynvyn (Chukchi). A locality of 89 residents between 1946 and 1950 that had grown from just 13 in 1927. It was located five miles east of Cape Dzhenretlen and was established in the early 20th century by American gold prospectors based there who built wooden houses. Its name derives from the Chukchi word Toyvyngynvyn, meaning "new fortress/wooden house".
Яндагай/Yandagay (Russian)	Also known as Яндагай/Yandagay (Russian), Янраӈай/Yanraṇay (Chukchi) and Янраӈаӄ/Yanraṇaq (Yupik) (not to be confused with Yanranay in Chaunsky District), and Yanranak. This was a locality on the southwest entrance to Saint Lawrence Bay between Akkani and Kotrytkino. In 1927, it had a population of 169, falling to 117 in 1950. In the 1950s, it was abolished and its population moved to Lorino.

== Demographics ==
Chukotsky District has the highest percentage of indigenous peoples in the whole of Chukotka, with 85% of people being of native origin. The native peoples are primarily Chukchi, but there are also small populations of Evens, Koryaks, and Yupik.

The remaining 15% of the population is of non-indigenous origin, mainly Russian. These people either migrated to the Far East or are the descendants of those who did, enticed by the higher pay, large pensions, and more generous allowances permitted to those prepared to endure the cold and the isolation, as well as those who were exiled here as a result of Stalin's purges or after having been released from the gulag.

== Economy ==
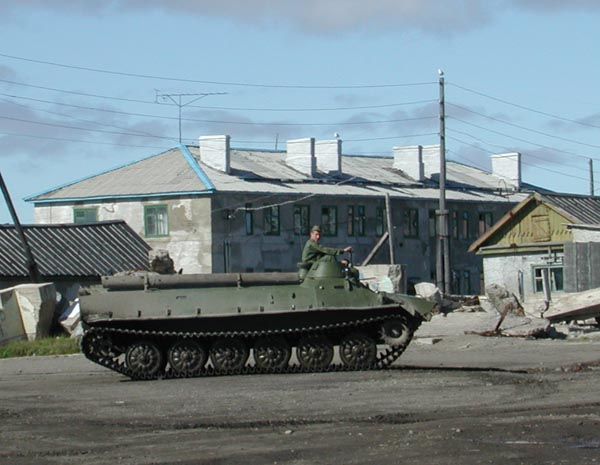
Transport in Lorino

Unlike with most other districts of Chukotka Autonomous Okrug, Chukotsky District's economy is much more focused on traditional marine hunting and reindeer herding. This is in part because, at around 85%, Chukotsky District has the highest percentage of indigenous peoples in the autonomous okrug. There is next to no industrial activity in this district, with the population mainly involved in reindeer herding, fishing, and seal hunting, with an administrative program in place to ensure that local indigenous peoples receive material incentives to continue with their traditional way of life.

== Culture ==
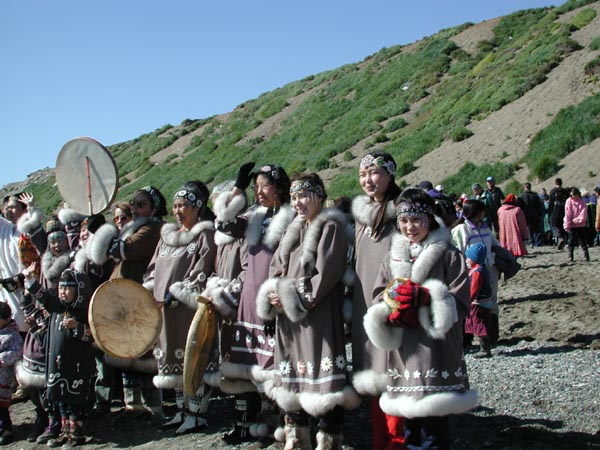
Dancers in Lorino

Although many native rural localities in the autonomous okrug have historical museums documenting the culture of the indigenous peoples, Chukotsky District has a particularly strong cultural tradition, with Uelen being a notable hub, particularly for whale bone carving. Famous for its walrus ivory carvings, Uelen has long been a major artistic center in the region, with several of the leading exponents of the craft, such as Vukvutagin, Vukvol, Tukkay, and Khukhutan, working out of Uelen. It is also home to an indigenous choir which has a history of cultural collaboration with their Inuit cousins across the Bering Strait in Alaska.

The village also serves as the base for archaeological expeditions to the area, which have uncovered a burial ground containing over three hundred burials of early Whale Hunter cultures, covering a time span from 500 BCE to 1000 CE. These excavations have shown that Uelen was a major settlement in the first centuries CE. In addition to revealing the existence of a culture dependent on whale and walrus hunting, archeologists also unearthed early examples of the indigenous peoples ivory carvings, a number of which are now held at the Peter the Great Museum of Anthropology and Ethnography in St. Petersburg.

The writer Yuri Rytkheu was born in Uelen in 1930 to a family of trappers and hunters and was the first Chukchi author to achieve national prominence. His book A Dream in Polar Fog deals with the Chukchi people's efforts to adapt when a foreigner is shipwrecked on their shores.

The district hosts the dog sled race "Hope" and the sea hunters' "Beringiya" festival.

== Administrative and municipal status ==
Within the framework of administrative divisions, Chukotsky District is one of the six in the autonomous okrug. The selo of Lavrentiya serves as its administrative center. The district does not have any lower-level administrative divisions and has administrative jurisdiction over six rural localities.

As a municipal division, the district is incorporated as Chukotsky Municipal District and is divided into six rural settlements.

=== Inhabited localities ===
The six rural localities in Chukotsky District

Municipal composition
Rural settlements	Population	Male	Female	Rural localities in jurisdiction*
Enurmino (Энурмино)	301	139 (46.2%)	162 (53.8%)	**selo of Enurmino**
Inchoun (Инчоун)	387	185 (47.8%)	202 (52.2%)	**selo of Inchoun**
Lavrentiya (Лаврентия)	1459	703 (48.2%)	756 (51.8%)	**selo of Lavrentiya** (administrative center of the district)
Lorino (Лорино)	1267	628 (49.6%)	639 (50.4%)	**selo of Lorino**
Neshkan (Нешкан)	704	352 (50.0%)	352 (50.0%)	**selo of Neshkan**
Uelen (Уэлен)	720	368 (51.1%)	352 (48.9%)	**selo of Uelen**

Divisional source:
Population source:
*Administrative centers are shown in bold

== Gallery ==
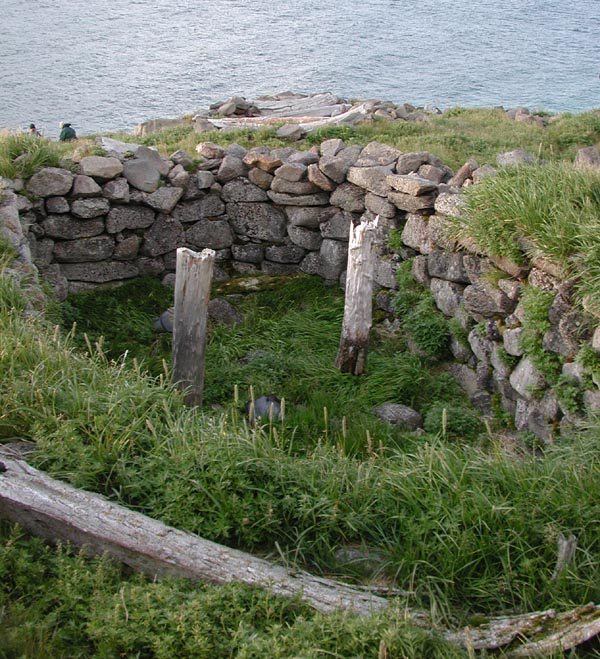
Ruined semi-subterranean house, Naukan, near Cape Dezhnev

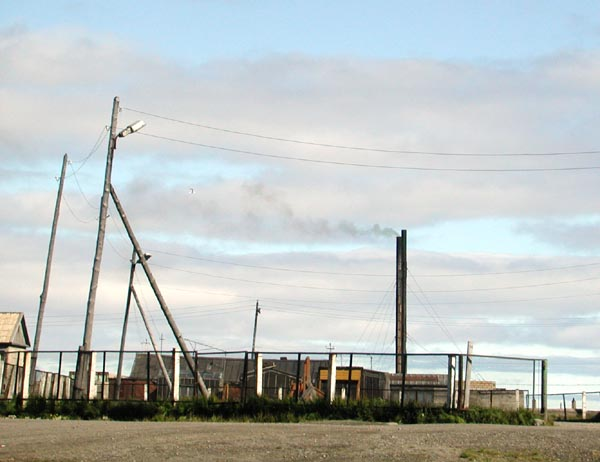
Power generation, Lorino

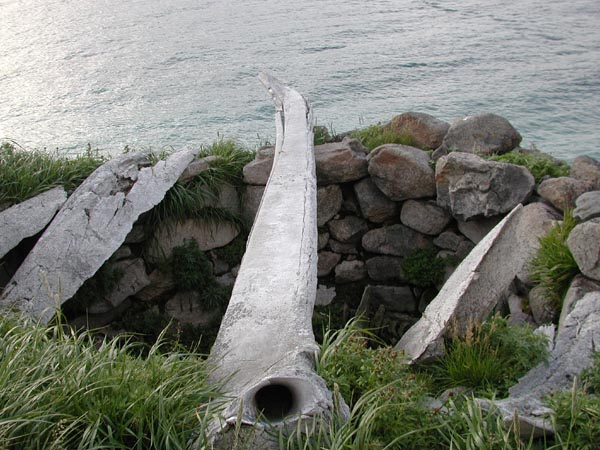
Meat storage pit, Naukan. Whale ribs cover the pit.

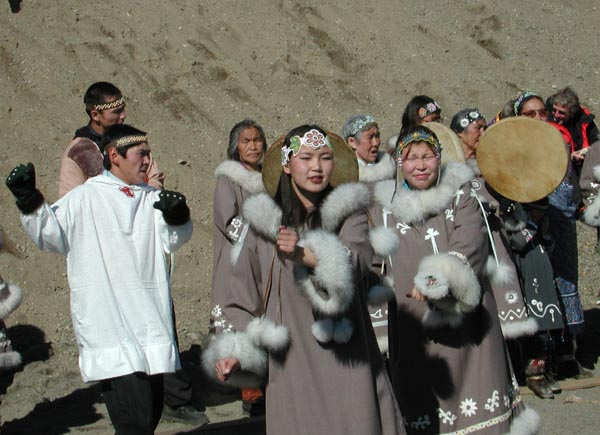
Female dancers, Lorino

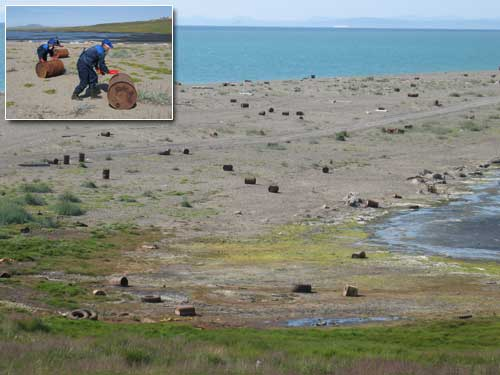
Abandoned Barrels near Lavrentiya

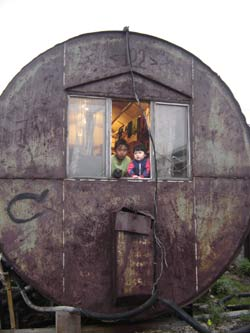
Family living in abandoned barrel
