= List of accidents and incidents involving the DC-3 (1970–1974) =

This is a list of accidents and incidents involving the Douglas DC-3 (Note: Military versions of the DC-3 were known as C-47 Skytrain, C-48, C-49, C-50, C-51, C-52, C-53 Skytrooper, C-68, C-84, C-117 Super Dakota and YC-129 by the United States Army Air Forces and as the R4D by the United States Navy. In Royal Air Force (and other British Commonwealth air forces') service, these aircraft were known as Dakotas.) that occurred in the early to mid 1970s, including aircraft based on the DC-3 airframe such as the Douglas C-47 Skytrain and Lisunov Li-2. Military accidents are included; and hijackings and incidents of terrorism are covered, although acts of war involving military aircraft are outside the scope of this list.

== 1970 ==
Date	Type	Registration/ Military serial/ Call sign	Fatalities	Info
2 January	Douglas C-47	XW-PGJ	4	A DC-3 conversion of a C-47 operated by Xieng Khouang Air Transport crashed into a mountain near Long Cheng in Laos, killing all four people on board.
9 January	Douglas C-47	—N/a	1	An attempt was made to hijack a Douglas C-47 of RAPSA at Enrique Malek International Airport, David City, Panama. The hijacker was overpowered and arrested, but there was one fatality. The aircraft was due to operate a domestic flight to Bocas del Toro Airport.
13 January	Douglas C-47B	5W-FAC	32	Polynesian Airlines Flight 208B, operated by Douglas C-47B 5W-FAC crashed into the sea shortly after take-off from Samoa's Faleolo International Airport on an international non-scheduled passenger flight to Pago Pago International Airport in American Samoa. All 32 people on board were killed.
13 January	Douglas C-47A	L2-17/00	1	The Royal Thai Air Force C-47 crashed on take-off from Chiang Klang Airport in far northern Thailand near the Thai-Lao border.
12 February	Douglas DC-3	TAM-11	None	Crashed while attempting an emergency landing at a small airfield in Laja Municipality near La Paz, Bolivia. The aircraft was operated by Transporte Aéreo Militar, a quasi-airline of the Bolivian Air Force, on a non-scheduled passenger flight. All five people on board survived.
12 February	Douglas C-47B	CC-CBT	None	Ditched off Puerto Montt in Chile following the failure of both engines. The aircraft was operated by Aero Aysen on a cargo flight, both crew survived.
12 February	Douglas C-47	HK-1270	14	Crashed near Puerto López in central Colombia while attempting to return to La Vanguardia Airport in Villavicencio following an engine overspeed. The aircraft was operated by Aéreas La Urraca on a scheduled passenger flight from Villavicencio to César Gaviria Trujillo Airport in Inírida in far-eastern Colombia. Thirteen of the fourteen people on board were killed in the crash and the lone survivor died a few days later.
15 February	Douglas C-47A	9Q-CUP	—N/a	The Air Congo aircraft was reported to have been written off at N'djili International Airport in Kinshasa, Democratic Republic of the Congo.
20 February	Douglas DC-3	B-243	2	Crashed into a mountain shortly after take-off from Songshan Airport in Taipei, the capital of the Republic of China. The aircraft was operating a cargo flight, both crew were killed.
5 March	Lisunov Li-2	CCCP-58340	None	The Aeroflot aircraft was damaged beyond economic repair when it departed the runway on take-off from Ust-Kut Airport in the Russian Socialist Republic of the Soviet Union.
21 March	Douglas C-47A	N163J	2	Operated by Aircraft Charter Inc., the aircraft crashed at Melchor Ocampo, Zacatecas in Mexico killing both crew. The aircraft was operating an international cargo flight from Laredo International Airport, Texas to Fresnillo in Mexico, which does not have an airport; smuggling is suspected.
22 March	Douglas DC-3	XC-CFE	—N/a	The DC-3 of the Comisión Federal de Electricidad (Federal Elecricity Commission, the Mexican government-owned electricity provider) was written off at Ciudad Miguel Alemán in northeastern Mexico near the country’s border with the US state of Texas.
19 April	Douglas C-47B	EP-AGZ	None	Stalled on take-off from Ahwaz Airport in Iran and crashed. The aircraft was destroyed by the subsequent fire. It was operated by Air Taxi Company on a non-scheduled passenger flight. All 25 people on board survived.
22 April	Douglas C-47A	B-308	None	The Winner Airways aircraft overran the runway on landing at Tuy Hoa Air Base in South Vietnam and was damaged beyond repair.
9 May	Douglas DC-3D	OO-AUX	None	The aircraft of Belgian airline Delta Air Transport was substantially damaged in a collision with a ground power unit at Amsterdam's Schiphol Airport in the Netherlands. After temporary repairs it was ferried to Antwerp Airport on 1 June but never flew again; the aircraft was subsequently used as a clubhouse. It was scrapped in September 1973.
21 May	Douglas C-47	N75430	None	The privately owned Douglas DC-3C conversion from a C-47 was damaged beyond repair in a forced landing near Barrow, Alaska. The aircraft was on an executive flight from Pingo Airstrip to Fairbanks International Airport when an engine failed due to loss of oil after an engine breather tube was blocked with ice prior to take-off. All three people on board survived.
21 May	Douglas DC-3	—N/a	None	The Douglas DC-3 of Colombia's national airline Avianca was hijacked to Yariguíes Airport, Barrancabermeja whilst on a domestic flight from El Alcaraván Airport, Yopal to Alberto Lleras Camargo Airport, Sogamoso. The hijackers had demanded that they be taken to Cuba.
19 June	Douglas C-47A	CF-AAC	None	The Austin Airways aircraft was written off in an accident on takeoff at Val-d'Or Airport, Quebec on a domestic charter flight.
3 July	Douglas C-47	N154R	7	The aircraft operated by Reeder Flying Service crashed on take-off from McGrath Airport, Alaska on a domestic passenger flight to Galena Airport, Alaska. Seven of the 27 people on board were killed.
6 July	Douglas VC-47A	T.3–43	—N/a	The aircraft of the Ejército del Aire (Spanish Air Force) was reported to have been written off in an accident at an unknown location.
14 July	Douglas DC-3	TAM-17	—N/a	Operated by Transporte Aéreo Militar, a quasi-airline of the Bolivian Air Force, the aircraft was damaged beyond repair in an accident at El Alto International Airport, La Paz.
23 July	Douglas C-47B	XW-TDC	—N/a	Operated by Xieng Khouang Air Transport, the aircraft was damaged beyond repair in a landing accident during inclement weather at an airstrip near Long Cheng in Laos.
23 July	Douglas C-47B	XW-TDO	—N/a	The Lao Airlines aircraft is reported to have been damaged beyond repair in an accident at an unknown location in Laos.
22 August	Douglas C-47A	PP-CCL	—N/a	Operated by the Brazilian airline Serviços Aéreos Cruzeiro do Sul, the aircraft was written off in an accident at Cruzeiro do Sul in the Brazilian state of Acre.
30 August	Douglas C-47	CF-JRY	—N/a	The D.G. Harris Productions aircraft was damaged beyond economic repair in a storm while parked at Toronto International Airport.
3 September	Douglas DC-3	G-AVPW	None	The aircraft of British aerial survey company Hunting Surveys was substantially damaged when it was subjected to ground fire on take-off from Nova Lisboa Airport in Angola. Hydraulic lines were damaged and the fuel tanks ruptured. A successful emergency landing was made at Luanda Airport. The aircraft was repaired and returned to service.
30 September	Douglas DST	B-305	3	The Republic of China-registered Douglas Sleeper Transport of South Vietnamese airline Air Vietnam crashed into a hill near Da Nang in South Vietnam while attempting to divert to Da Nang Airport due to weather conditions at its intended destination of Phu Bai Airport, Huế. Three of the 38 people on board were killed.
1 October	Douglas R4D-6	N47	2	Part of the US Federal Aviation Administration's fleet of aircraft, the DC-3 conversion of a US Navy R4D stalled and crashed shortly after take-off from Anchorage International Airport in Alaska and was destroyed in the subsequent fire. The aircraft was operating a local training flight. Both crew were killed.
October 6	Douglas C-47B	ZS-DKR	3	Crashed near Germiston following the failure of the port engine shortly after take-off from Rand Airport on an executive flight. Three of the 11 people on board were killed.
October 7	Douglas C-47	CF-TAR	—N/a	This Transair aircraft was reported to have been written off.
October 16	Lisunov Li-2	CCCP-84777	—N/a	Crashed on take-off from Leshukonskoye Airport, Arkhangelsk. The aircraft was overloaded and its centre of gravity was beyond the aft limit.
6 November	Douglas C-47B	ZK-AXS	None	The aircraft of the New Zealand government's Ministry of Transport was damaged beyond economic repair at Paraparaumu Airport in the North Island of New Zealand during a simulated downwind takeoff, when the undercarriage collapsed. The aircraft was operating a training flight. The fuselage was subsequently used for fire training purposes, and was last reported to be at Wellington.
November 9	Douglas C-47	—N/a	—N/a	Hijacked and diverted to Doha Airport, Baghdad.
November 10	Douglas DC-3	—N/a	—N/a	This flight from Amman Civil Airport, Jordan to King Khalid International Airport, Riyadh Saudi Arabia was hijacked and diverted to Damascus Airport, Syria.
19 November	Douglas C-47A	PI-C9	—N/a	All three aircraft were damaged beyond repair by Typhoon Patsy while parked at Manila International Airport. PI-C9 and PI-C15 were part of the Philippine Airlines fleet, while PI-C944 belonged to Filipinas Orient Airways. A fourth aircraft, a Handley Page Dart Herald of Air Manila, was also damaged beyond repair when the hangar it was in collapsed.
19 November	Douglas C-47A	PI-C15	—N/a	All three aircraft were damaged beyond repair by Typhoon Patsy while parked at Manila International Airport. PI-C9 and PI-C15 were part of the Philippine Airlines fleet, while PI-C944 belonged to Filipinas Orient Airways. A fourth aircraft, a Handley Page Dart Herald of Air Manila, was also damaged beyond repair when the hangar it was in collapsed.
19 November	Douglas DC-3D	PI-C944	—N/a	All three aircraft were damaged beyond repair by Typhoon Patsy while parked at Manila International Airport. PI-C9 and PI-C15 were part of the Philippine Airlines fleet, while PI-C944 belonged to Filipinas Orient Airways. A fourth aircraft, a Handley Page Dart Herald of Air Manila, was also damaged beyond repair when the hangar it was in collapsed.
December 4	Douglas C-53D	FAN-411	6	Crashed near the Turrialba Volcano whilst on a flight from Managua International Airport, Nicaragua to a destination in Panama City killing all 6 on board.
December 5	Douglas C-47A	VT-CZC	5	Crashed shortly after take-off from Safdarjung Airport, New Delhi following an engine failure. The aircraft was operating a non-scheduled passenger flight. Five of the sixteen people on board were killed.
December 6	Douglas C-53D	PP-CDH	—N/a	Crashed near the Turrialba Volcano whilst on a flight from Mexico City International Airport, Mexico to a destination in Chile.

== 1971 ==
Date	Type	Registration/ Military serial/ Call sign	Fatalities	Info
January 4	Douglas C-47A	N7	None	Crashed on approach to La Guardia Airport, New York. The aircraft was on a flight from Johnstown-Cambria County Airport, Johnstown, Pennsylvania. The cause of the accident was windshear.
January 22	Douglas DC-3	—N/a	None	This Ethiopian Airlines flight was hijacked en route from Bahir Dar Airport to Gondar Airport by four Eritrean hijackers. The aircraft was forced to land at Benghazi Airport.
February 14	Douglas C-47	N14273	None	Crashed on approach to Shawnee Municipal Airport, Shawnee, Oklahoma following the failure of the port engine. All 29 people on board survived. The aircraft was on a local sightseeing flight.
February 19	Douglas C-47B	N99H	None	Damaged beyond economic repair in a take-off accident at an airport in Houston, Texas. The cause was a maintenance error which cause the starboard brakes to bind.
February 25	Douglas DC-3	LV-JTC	—N/a	Damaged beyond economic repair in an accident at Teniente General Benjamín Matienzo International Airport.
March 2	Douglas C-47	HC-ALC	—N/a	Damaged beyond economic repair.
March 24	Douglas C-47B	N49319	None	Damaged beyond economic repair in a landing accident at Red Devil Airport, Alaska. The aircraft was on an executive flight from Bethel Airport.
March 26	Douglas C-47A	VT-ATT	15	Crashed into a hill near Hashimara whilst on a flight from Guwahati Airport to Bagdogra Airport. All 15 people on board were killed.
April 5	Douglas C-47A	N57372	None	Damaged beyond economic repair in a landing accident at Beef Island Airport. The aircraft was operating an international cargo flight from San Juan, Puerto Rico.
April 6	Douglas R4D-6	5Y-DCA	—N/a	Damaged beyond economic repair in an accident at an airport in Nairobi.
April 15	Douglas C-47A	293246	40	Crashed shortly after take-off from Floridablanca Airfield following the failure of the starboard engine. All 40 people on board were killed. The aircraft was operating a military flight to Manila Airport. The accident was the second-worst involving the DC-3 at the time, and is the 3rd worst as of 2010.
May 4	Douglas C-47	TAM-22	None	Crashed shortly after take-off from El Alto Airport, La Paz on a cargo flight operated by Transporte Aéreo Militar, a quasi-airline of the Bolivian Air Force, to El Jovi Airport.
June 3	Douglas DC-3	PH-MOA	None	Crashed on landing at Southend Airport. The aircraft was operating an international non-scheduled passenger flight to the Netherlands carrying supporters of Ajax Football Club when an oil leak was discovered shortly after take-off and it was decided to return to Southend. The aircraft overran the runway on landing and landed up alongside the railway line beyond the airport boundary.
June 13	Lisunov Li-2	—N/a	None	Crashed in thick fog on Big Diomede Island on the Soviet side of the Bering Strait. All crew members (likely four) were injured. The hull remains visible at 65.7783°N 169.0666°W as of January 2020.
June 15	Douglas C-47A	EP-ADG	—N/a	Damaged beyond economic repair in an accident at Shiraz Airport.
June 28	Douglas C-47	N90627	17	Crashed on take-off from Shelter Cove Airport, California on a domestic non-scheduled passenger flight to San Jose International Airport. Seventeen of the 24 people on board were killed. The cause of the accident was that flight was attempted with the rudder and elevator gust locks in place. Inadequate pre-flight inspection was a contributory factor.
June 30	Douglas C-47B	XW-TDI	3	Written off in an accident at Ban Huoeisay Airport.
July 16	Douglas C-47B	N74844	None	Crashed on approach to Bradley International Airport, Connecticut. The aircraft was on a ferry flight to Beverly Municipal Airport, Massachusetts when an engine lost power shortly after take-off due to water in the fuel. At the time of the accident, the aircraft was attempting to return to Bradley Airport.
July 24	Douglas C-47A	6V-AAP	6	Crashed into a hill shortly after take-off from Bamako Airport. The aircraft was operating a scheduled passenger flight. All six people on board were killed.
August 22	Douglas DC-3A	B-304	—N/a	Written off at Kampot Airport.
September 6	Douglas C-47B	A65-73	—N/a	The Royal Australian Air Force Dakota was damaged beyond economic repair in an accident at Townsville Airport in Queensland, Australia. The aircraft subsequently went on static display as part of the Beck Collection in Mareeba, Queensland. It is now at the Far North Queensland Aviation Museum at Mareeba Airfield.
September 9	Douglas R4D-6	8P-AAC	2	Crashed into a mountain in Guadeloupe.
September 12	Douglas C-47A	HC-AUX	—N/a	Crashed at Cerro de Hojas.
September 16	Douglas C-47A	4W-ABI	5	Crashed at Preševo. The aircraft was operating a non-scheduled passenger flight which had departed from Beograd Airport. All five people on board were killed.
September 28	Douglas DC-3A	PP-CBV	32	Crashed on approach to Sena Madureira Airport killing all 32 people on board. The aircraft was operating a domestic non-scheduled passenger flight to President Médici Airport when an engine failed shortly after take-off from Sena Madureira.
October 2	Douglas DC-3A	N1981W	None	Ditched 20 miles (32 km) off Sint Maarten. The aircraft was operating a ferry flight from Alexander Hamilton International Airport to Princess Juliana International Airport when it ran out of fuel. All three people on board survived.
October 17	Douglas C-47A	HK-595	19	Crashed on take-off from Eduardo Falla Solano Airport, San Vicente del Caguán, killing all 19 people on board. The aircraft was operating a domestic non-scheduled passenger flight although it was only certified to carry freight and three crew. It was also overloaded by 311 kilograms (686 lb).
November 2	Douglas CC-129 Dakota	12930	8	A Douglas Dakota from 440 Transport and Rescue Squadron of the Air Command of the Canadian Armed Forces was on a mission as Rescue 930 to drop supplies to a stranded pilot 110 kilometres (68 mi) southeast of Paulatuk, Northwest Territories, Canada in Tuktut Nogait National Park. All eight aircrew died when the aircraft crashed as a result of inflight icing.
November 3	Douglas C-47B	HC-ANJ	3	Crashed into a hill at Nevado Santo Isabel, killing all three people on board. The aircraft was being ferried to El Dorado International Airport, Bogotá. The wreckage was not discovered until 6 January 1972.
November 10	Douglas EC-47Q	43-48009	—N/a	Damaged in a take-off accident at Kamphaeng Saen Air Base, Nakhon Pathom. The aircraft was repaired and returned to service.
December 15	Douglas C-47A	BJ622	—N/a	Written off at an unknown location.
December 17	Douglas C-47A	BJ662	5	Written off in an accident at Machuka, killing all five people on board.
December 17	Douglas C-47	HJ244	—N/a	Damaged beyond economic repair in an accident at Machuka.
December 21	Douglas DC-3	XW-TFC	2	Crashed at Ban Boum. Both crew were killed, but the single passenger survived.

== 1972 ==
Date	Type	Registration/ Military serial/ Call sign	Fatalities	Info
January 5, 1972	Douglas C-47B	CF-KAH	—N/a	Damaged beyond economic repair at Norman Wells Airport.
January 21, 1972	Douglas DC-3	FAC-661	39	Crashed at San Nicolas whilst operating a domestic non-scheduled passenger flight from Enrique Olaya Herrera Airport, Medellín to Gerardo Tobar López Airport, Buenaventurea.
February 10, 1972	Douglas DC-3	—N/a	5	Written off near Dhaka, killing all five people on board. The aircraft was on a training flight.
March 14, 1972	Douglas C-47	HC-SJE	6	Damaged beyond economic repair in an accident at Sangai.
April 11, 1972	Douglas C-47	VH-PNB	None	Overran the runway on landing at Madang Airport, ending up in the sea damaged beyond economic repair.
April 20, 1972	Douglas C-47D	OB-R-653	6	Crashed into Mount Killukichu near Moyobamba. The aircraft was operating a domestic cargo flight from FAP Captain José Abelardo Quiñones González International Airport to Tarapoto Airport via Moyobamba Airport. All six people on board were killed.
May 8, 1972	Douglas VC-47J	YV-C-GAI	7	Crashed into a mountain whilst on a domestic scheduled passenger flight from Tomás de Heres Airport, Ciudad Bolívar to La Centella Airport. All seven people on board were killed.
July 2, 1972	Douglas C-47B	F-WSGU	—N/a	Damaged beyond economic repair in an accident at Kulusuk Airport.
July 7, 1972	Douglas DC-3	XW-PHW	None	Overran the runway on landing at Kompong Som Airport and was damaged beyond economic repair.
July 11, 1972	Douglas C-47B	HZ-AAK	—N/a	Damaged beyond economic repair in an accident at Tabuk Airport.
July 17, 1972	Douglas C-47A	VH-MAE	None	Damaged beyond economic repair when the starboard undercarriage collapsed on landing at Madang Airport. The aircraft was operating a domestic cargo flight from Wapenamanda Airport.
July 21, 1972	Douglas C-53	N39393	None	Overran the runway on landing at Pivijai Airport and was damaged beyond economic repair. The aircraft was on a flight from Tocumen International Airport, Panama City, Panama to Queen Beatrix International Airport, Oranjestad, Aruba when a smell of burning was detected in the cockpit and the pilot decided to divert to Pivijai.
July 29, 1972	Douglas DC-3A	HK-107	21	On 29 July, Douglas DC-3As HK-107 and HK-1341 of Avianca were involved in a mid-air collision over the Las Palomas Mountains. Both aircraft crashed, killing 21 people on HK-107 and 17 people on HK-1341. Both aircraft were operating domestic scheduled passenger flights from La Vanguardia Airport, Villavicencio to El Yopal Airport.
August 4, 1972	Douglas DC-3	N31538	None	Suffered an in-flight engine fire shortly after take-off from NAS Point Mugu, California on a cargo flight to Hollywood-Burbank Airport. The aircraft departed the runway in the emergency landing and was destroyed by the subsequent fire. All three people on board survived.
August 4, 1972	Douglas C-47B	6850	—N/a	Written off in an accident at Snake Valley, near AFB Swartkop.
August 16, 1972	Douglas C-47B	XY-ACM	28	Crashed shortly after take-off from Thandwe Airport on a scheduled passenger flight. 28 out of 31 people on board were killed.
August 20, 1972	Douglas DC-3A	PK-ZDD	—N/a	Written off in an accident at Sumbawa Besar.
August 27, 1972	Douglas C-47	YV-C-AKE	34	Suffered a failure of the port engine shortly after take-off from Canaima Airport on a domestic scheduled passenger flight to Tomás de Heres Airport, Ciudad Bolivar. The aircraft crashed whilst attempting to return to Canaima, killing all 34 people on board. The aircraft, c/n 4705, is preserved at the Museo Aeronaútico de Maracay.
September 10, 1972	Douglas C-47	ET-ABQ	11	Crashed near Gondar following the in-flight separation of the starboard wing. The aircraft was operating a domestic scheduled passenger flight from Axum Airport to Gondar Airport. All 11 people on board were killed.
September 13, 1972	Douglas C-47A	9N-RF10	31	Crashed near Panchkhal after hitting electricity supply lines. The aircraft was engaged in parachuting activity, based at Tribhuvan International Airport, Kathmandu.
September 17, 1972	Douglas C-47A	CP-565	None	Crashed on take-off from El Alto International Airport, La Paz. The aircraft was operating a non-scheduled passenger flight. All four people on board survived.
September 25, 1972	Douglas C-47A	TAM-24	None	Damaged beyond economic repair in an accident at Caranavi Airport while being operated by Transporte Aéreo Militar, a quasi-airline of the Bolivian Air Force. A photograph taken in 1981 shows the hulk of the aircraft was at El Alto International Airport, La Paz.
September 30, 1972	Douglas C-47B	EC-AQE	1	Crashed on take-off from Madrid-Barajas Airport. The aircraft was being used for training duties and the student pilot over-rotated and stalled. One of the six people on board was killed.
October 2, 1972	Douglas C-47	XW-TDA	9	Shot down on approach to Kampot Airport. The aircraft was operating a passenger flight, all nine people on board were killed.
October 30, 1972	Douglas C-47B	VH-PNA	—N/a	Overran the runway on landing at Madang Airport. The aircraft was subsequently withdrawn from use and used for fire practice, eventually being scrapped in 1978.
November 1, 1972	Douglas DC-3	4W-ABJ	—N/a	Damaged beyond economic repair in a landing accident at Beihan Airport.
November 17, 1972	Douglas C-47A	CF-FOL	3	Ditched east of St John's following fuel exhaustion. The aircraft was operating an international non-scheduled passenger flight from Keflavík International Airport to St. John's International Airport. All three people on board were killed.
November 21, 1972	Douglas EC-47Q	43-49771	2	Crashed at Nakhon Phanom Royal Thai Navy Base, killing two of the 10 people on board. The aircraft was operated by the 361st Tactical Electronic Warfare Squadron, United States Air Force.
December 1, 1972	Douglas C-47A	CF-TQW	2	Crashed into a mountain west of Norman Wells, Northwest Territories. The aircraft was operating a cargo flight which had departed from Norman Wells Airport. Both crew were killed.
December 6, 1972	Douglas C-47B	CF-AUQ	None	Crashed 11.9 miles (19 km) south of Lake Randall, Quebec. All three people on board survived.
December 26, 1972	Douglas C-47	—N/a	—N/a	Damaged beyond economic repair in an accident at Tonquil Island.

== 1973 ==
Date	Type	Registration/ Military serial/ Call sign	Fatalities	Info
January 19, 1973	Douglas C-47B	PK-EHC	None	Crashed on landing at Supadio Airport, Pontianak and was destroyed in the subsequent fire. All four people on board escaped.
January 29, 1973	Douglas C-47	PP-SQA	—N/a	Crashed on landing at Rondonópolis Airport.
February 3, 1973	Douglas C-47	IJ341	—N/a	Damaged beyond economic repair.
February 6, 1973	Douglas C-47B	CF-HTH	—N/a	Damaged beyond economic repair when it was hit by a vehicle at an airport in Montreal.
February 12, 1973	Douglas C-47A	CF-OOV	None	Crashed on approach to Iqaluit Airport. The aircraft was on a ferry flight to Resolute Bay Airport when power was lost shortly after take-off from Iqaluit and the decision was made to return. All three people on board survived.
February 21, 1973	Douglas C-47A	HP-560	22	Crashed into Cerro Horqueta mountain killing 22 of the 28 people on board. The aircraft was operating a domestic non-scheduled passenger flight from Enrique Malek Airport, David to Changuinola "Capitan Manuel Niño" International Airport.
February 23, 1973	Douglas DC-3F	ZK-AOI	1	Crashed at Seddon following the in-flight structural failure of the starboard wing between the engine nacelle and the fuselage, killing the pilot. The aircraft had been modified for aerial topdressing after being retired from Royal New Zealand Air Force service in 1966 and was owned by topdressing company Southern Air Super at the time of the crash, based at Woodbourne Airport, Blenheim. The accident investigation found that the wing failure had been caused by overstressing of the structure due to the aircraft operating from rough airstrips and that the aircraft was overloaded on its last flight.
March 2, 1973	Douglas C-47	N6574	None	Overran the runway on landing at San Salvador Airport and was damaged beyond economic repair. The cause was pilot error in that a downwind landing was made. The aircraft was operating an international non-scheduled passenger flight from Miami International Airport, United States.
March 31, 1973	Douglas DC-3D	6169	—N/a	Crash landed at Cuito Cuanavale after being hit by small arms fire from the ground. The aircraft was operating a military flight from Quatro de Fevereiro Airport, Luanda to Henrique de Carvalho Airport.
April 11, 1973	Douglas C-47	T.3-37	—N/a	Involved in an accident and was subsequently withdrawn from use.
May 3, 1973	Lisunov Li-2	CCCP-04244	None	Fell through the ice in Antarctica at 82°15′S 125°00′W whilst taxiing. The aircraft was subsequently deliberately destroyed for security reasons.
May 4, 1973	Douglas DC-3	—N/a	3	Destroyed on the ground at Kampot Airport.
May 19, 1973	Douglas C-47A	XW-TDM	11	Crashed shortly after take-off from Svay Rieng Airport. All eleven people on board were killed.
May 29, 1973	Douglas C-47A	CF-QBB	4	Crashed on approach to Rimouski Airport, killing all four people on board.
June 1, 1973	Douglas DC-3	HI-117	—N/a	Crashed at Santiago de los Caballeros.
July 5, 1973	Douglas C-47B	5H-AAK	—N/a	Crashed at Mbeya Airport.
August 7, 1973	Douglas C-47	HJ916	—N/a	Written off following an accident.
August 22, 1973	Douglas DC-3A	HK-111	16	Crashed into a hill near Casanare killing 16 of the 17 people on board. The aircraft was operating a domestic scheduled passenger flight from La Vanguardia Airport, Villavicencio to El Alcaraván Airport, Yopal.
September 12, 1973	Douglas DC-3	XW-PKD	None	Damaged beyond economic repair at Kampot Airport.
September 30, 1973	Douglas C-47A	PT-CEV	9	Crashed shortly after take-off from Miritituba Airport, killing all nine people on board.
October 2, 1973	Douglas C-47	T.3-25	—N/a	Involved in an accident and was subsequently withdrawn from use.
October 10, 1973	Lisunov Li-2	CCCP-71209	5	Crashed on take-off from Tashauz Airport, Turkmenistan on a cargo flight to Darvaza Airport following double engine failure. All five people on board were killed. Aeroflot retired all civil Li-2s following this accident.
November 17, 1973	Douglas C-47B	XV-NIE	27	Crashed 20 kilometres (11 nmi) north north west of Quảng Ngãi killing all 27 people on board. The aircraft was operating a domestic scheduled passenger flight from Tan Son Nhat International Airport, Saigon to Quảng Ngãi Airport.
November 21, 1973	Douglas R4D-8	17171	None	Made a forced landing on a sandur in Vestur-Skaftafellssýsla and was abandoned. As of 2020, the fuselage of the aircraft remains at the site and has become a tourist attraction.
November 23, 1973	Douglas C-47	MM61832	4	Crashed at Porto Marghera killing four people.
December 3, 1973	Douglas DC-3	XW-PHV	—N/a	Crashed shortly after take-off from Phnom Penh International Airport.
December 13, 1973	Douglas DC-3	4W-ABR	—N/a	Damaged beyond economic repair at Ta'izz International Airport.
December 27, 1973	Douglas DC-3A	N19428	None	Damaged beyond economic repair when it was landed next to a road in West Palm Beach, Florida following fuel exhaustion. The aircraft was operating a domestic passenger flight for Shawnee Airlines from Orlando International Airport to Palm Beach International Airport.
December 28, 1973	Douglas C-49E	ZS-DAK	1	Ditched off Umbogintwini Beach, south of Durban following loss of power to both engines. The aircraft was operating a passenger flight to Louis Botha Airport. One passenger drowned. An engine from this aircraft is displayed in the South African Air Force Museum.
December 29, 1973	Douglas C-49D	EM-3	None	Overran the runway on landing at Dalat Airport. The aircraft was substantially damaged and was not salvaged due to the presence of land mines in the area. It was operating a non-scheduled passenger flight. All nine people on board survived.

== 1974 ==
Date	Type	Registration/ Military serial/ Call sign	Fatalities	Info
January 8, 1974	Douglas VC-47B	6161	—N/a	Crashed at Vila Cabral Airport and was damaged beyond economic repair. The aircraft was on a military flight from Mueda Airport and it is reported that it was hit by small arms fire on approach to Vila Cabral.
January 17, 1974	Douglas DC-3A	HK-1216	14	Crashed near Chigorodó killing all 14 people on board. The aircraft was on a scheduled passenger flight which had originated at Gonzalo Mejía Airport.
January 19, 1974	Douglas DC-3	TAM-30	—N/a	Operated by Transporte Aéreo Militar, a quasi-airline of the Bolivian Air Force, the aircraft was damaged beyond economic repair in a wheels-up landing at Laia.
January 21, 1974	Douglas C-47A	PK-GDC	None	Damaged beyond economic repair in an accident at Broome Airport.
January 24, 1974	Douglas C-47A	5V-MAG	4	Damaged beyond economic repair in an accident at Lama Kara.
January 28, 1974	Douglas C-47B	CF-TVK	—N/a	Destroyed in a hangar fire at Carp Airport, Ottawa.
February 15, 1974	Douglas DC-3	TI-1086C	None	Damaged beyond economic repair when it crash-landed at Managua Airport.
February 23, 1974	Douglas TC-47B	HK-1333	None	Damaged beyond economic repair in a forced landing near Cali. The aircraft had departed from Alfonso Bonilla Aragón International Airport. An engine failure and in-flight fire meant a forced landing in a field.
April 10, 1974	Douglas C-47B	A65-111	—N/a	Destroyed by fire on the ground at RAAF Base Laverton, where it had been in storage since October 1972 pending its disposal. The cockpit was salvaged and in 1976 was sold to a private individual who restored it over a period of 13 years. The cockpit is now permanently mounted on a trailer and is displayed at air shows in Australia by its owner.
April 20, 1974	Douglas DC-3	XW-TFL	6	Collided with some buildings. Six people were killed.
April 26, 1974	Douglas C-47	HJ254	—N/a	Damaged beyond economic repair.
May 2, 1974	Douglas C-47	HC-AUC	20	Crashed into a mountain near Baños de Agua Santa killing 20 of the 25 people on board. The aircraft had departed from Pastaza Airport.
May 28, 1974	Douglas DC-3	XW-TFN	—N/a	Crashed at Kampong Chan Airport.
July 3, 1974	Douglas DC-3	XW-PKT	—N/a	Written off at Kompong Som.
August 5, 1974	Douglas C-47A	C-FTAT	5	Crashed into Mount Apica, Bagotville, Quebec killing five of the eleven people on board. The aircraft was on a domestic non-scheduled passenger flight from La Tuque Airport to Saint Honoré Airport.
August 5, 1974	Douglas C-47B	ET-ABE	—N/a	Damaged beyond economic repair when it overshot the runway on landing at Mota Airport.
August 12, 1974	Douglas C-47	HK-508	27	Crashed into Trujillo Mountain killing all 27 people on board. The aircraft was on a domestic scheduled passenger flight from El Dorado Airport, Bogotá to La Florida Airport, Tumaco.
September 12, 1974	Douglas C-47A	BJ920	—N/a	Damaged beyond economic repair at a place in India.
October 5, 1974	Douglas DC-3	—N/a	6	Crashed in Guatemala killing all six people on board. The aircraft was operating a cargo flight carrying supplies for the relief of flood victims.
October 8, 1974	Douglas DC-3	XW-PKX	None	Damaged beyond economic repair in a take-off accident at Krakor Airport. The cause of the accident was that the pilot did not set the flaps to the take-off position.
October 9, 1974	Tp 79	79005	None	Crashed on approach to Nyköping Airport. All 27 people on board survived.
October 18, 1974	Douglas C-47A	PP-FOR	9	Crashed at Bias Fortes killing nine people.
October 19, 1974	Douglas C-47B	RP-C643	1	Ditched off Calapan following failure of the port engine. One of the eight people on board was killed. The aircraft was operating a domestic non-scheduled passenger flight which had originated at Roxas City Airport.
November 6, 1974	Douglas C-47	N76	None	Destroyed in a hangar fire at Anchorage International Airport, Alaska.
November 11, 1974	Douglas DC-3	TAM-34	—N/a	Operated by Transporte Aéreo Militar, a quasi-airline of the Bolivian Air Force, the aircraft crashed near the Sorato Mountain.
November 13, 1974	Douglas C-47	FAB2050	—N/a	Written off at Tomé-Açu.
November 15, 1974	Douglas C-47A	RP-C570	3	Damaged beyond economic repair when a forced landing was made in an open field inside Moonwalk Village shortly after take-off from Manila International Airport following failure of the starboard engine. One of the eight people on board was killed along with two children on the ground who were playing up in a fruit tree on the path of the crash landing.
November 20, 1974	Douglas C-47A	ET-AAR	2	Crashed on take-off from Soddu Airport. Two of the 24 people on board were killed. The aircraft was operating a domestic scheduled passenger flight to Beica Airport.
December 15, 1974	Douglas C-50	XW-TFI	—N/a	Crashed at Takéo.
December 25, 1974	Douglas C-47B	A65-104	—N/a	Damaged at RAAF Base Darwin during Cyclone Tracy and subsequently written off. The wings and tail of A65-104; and the rear fuselage and tail of PK-RDB that was destroyed the same morning; are now held in storage at the Australian Aviation Heritage Centre in Darwin.
December 25, 1974	Douglas C-47B	PK-RDB	—N/a	Damaged beyond repair at Darwin Airport during Cyclone Tracy. The rear fuselage and tail of PK-RDB; and the wings and tail of A65-104 that was destroyed the same morning; are now held in storage at the Australian Aviation Heritage Centre in Darwin.
