= Diomede, Alaska =

City in northwest Alaska

City of Diomede Iŋaliq (Inupiaq) Диомид (Russian)
- City
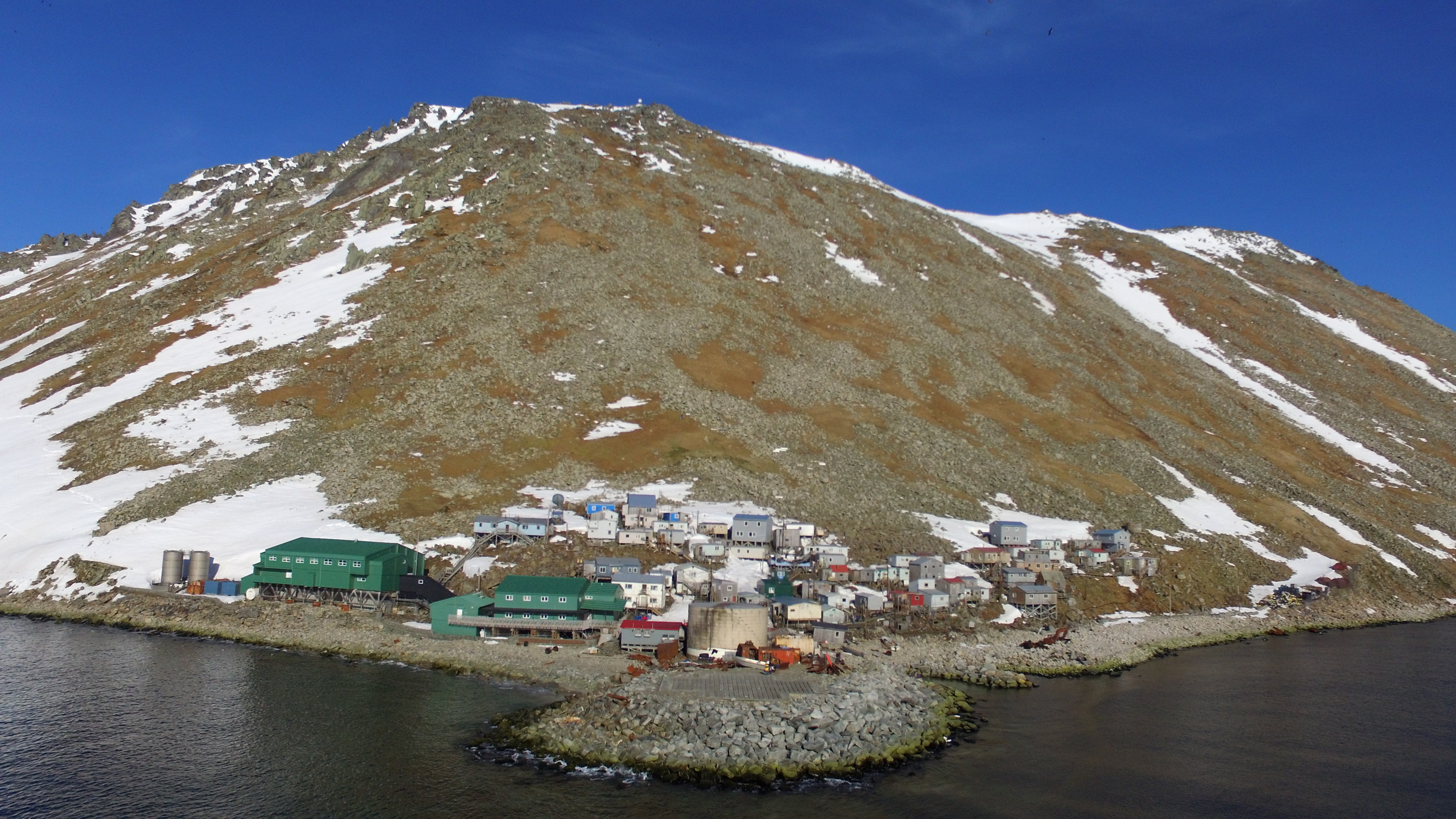
- View of Diomede

- Location in Alaska Location in North America
- Coordinates: 65°45′30″N 168°57′06″W
- Country: United States
- State: Alaska
- Census Area: Nome
- Incorporated: October 28, 1970

Government
  - Mayor: Cassandra Ahkvaluk
  - State senator: Donny Olson (D)
  - State rep.: Neal Foster (D)

Area
  - Total: 2.43 sq mi (6.30 km^{2})
  - Land: 2.43 sq mi (6.30 km^{2})
  - Water: 0 sq mi (0.00 km^{2})
- Elevation: 1,621 ft (494 m)

Population (2020)
  - Total: 83
  - Estimate (2025): 119
  - Density: 33.7/sq mi (13.02/km^{2})
- Time zone: UTC-09:00 (AKST)
  - Summer (DST): UTC-08:00 (AKDT)
- ZIP code: 99762
- Area code: 907
- FIPS code: 02-19060
- GNIS ID: 1401213

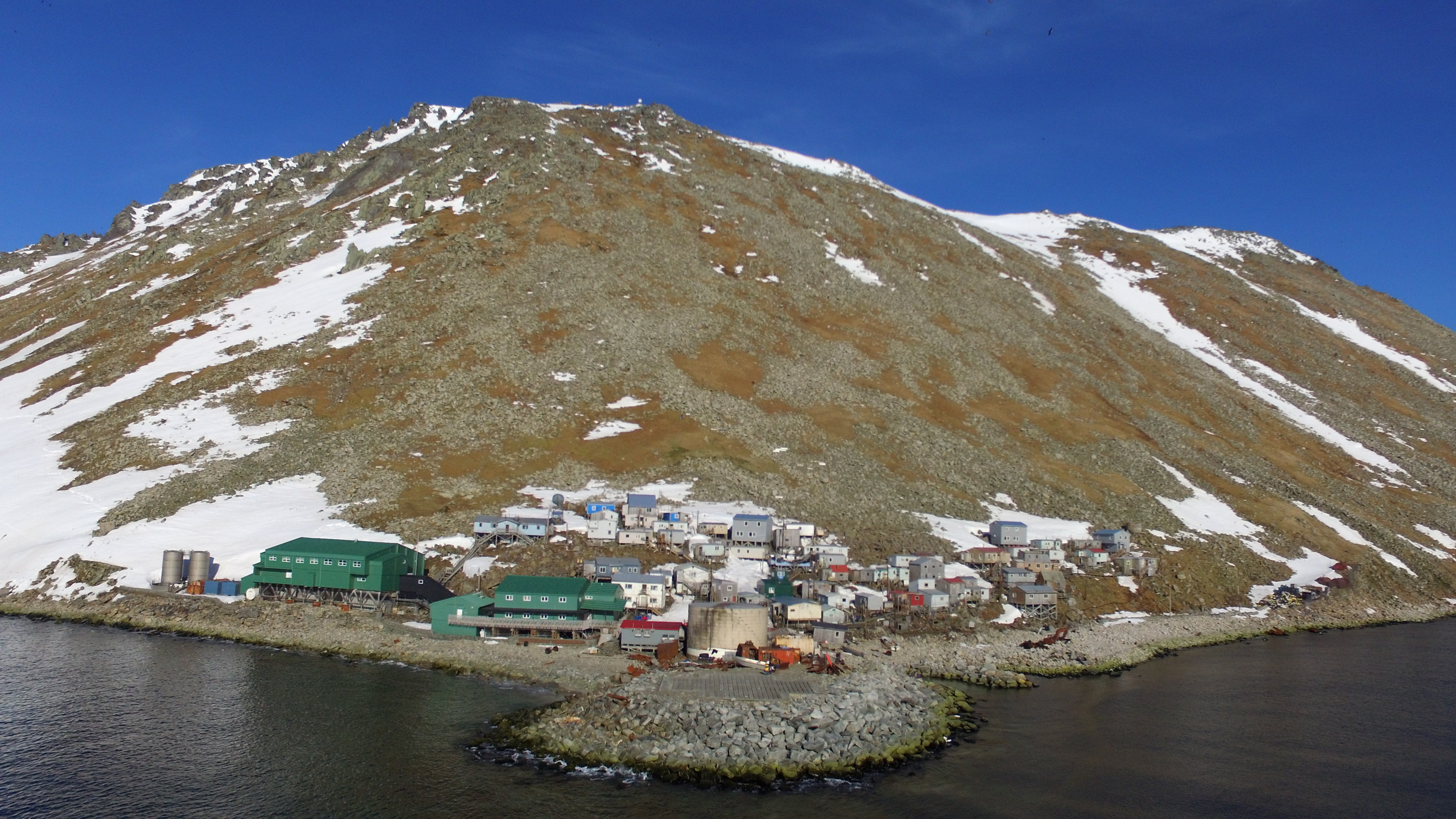
Drone photo, 2018

Diomede (Inupiaq: Iŋaliq; Russian: Диомид, romanized: Diomid) is an incorporated island city in the U.S. state of Alaska. Little Diomede Island is the smaller of the two Diomede Islands that are located in the middle of the Bering Strait; the larger of the two islands, Big Diomede Island, is part of Russia. As of 2020, the population of Diomede is 82.

Diomede's native name, Iŋaliq, means "the other one" or "the one over there".

== History ==
The current location of the city is believed by some archaeologists to have been inhabited for at least 3,000 years. It was originally a spring hunting campsite and the early explorers from the west found the Iñupiat (Inuit) at Diomede had an advanced culture, including elaborate whale hunting ceremonies. Trade occurred with both continents.

=== 1648–1867 ===
The first European to reach the Diomede Islands was Russian explorer Semyon Dezhnev, in 1648; the next was Danish-born Russian navigator and explorer Vitus Bering, who re-discovered the islands on August 16, 1728, and named the islands after martyr St. Diomede, who was celebrated in the Russian Orthodox Church on that date.

The United States purchased Alaska from Russia in 1867, including Little Diomede. A new boundary was drawn between the two Diomede Islands, and the Big Diomede was left to Russia.

=== 1880s–1920s ===
In the town's census of 1880, 40 residents of the island were recorded. According to naturalist John Muir, who visited the Diomede Islands in the 1880s, natives were eager to trade away everything they had. The village was perched on the steep rocky slope of the mountain, which has sheer drops into deep water. Huts were mostly built of stone with skin roofs.

During the Nome gold rush at the turn of the 20th century, Diomede villagers traveled to Nome along with the gold seekers, even though Nome was not a native village. People from Diomede arrived in umiaks and stayed in Nome for the summer, trading and gathering items before they returned to their isolated village.

=== 1930s-1940s ===
The first square building on the island was a small Catholic church, which was planned by Father Bellarmine Lafortune in 1935 and built by Father Thomas Cunningham during his residency on the island between 1936 and 1947. It was built from donated lumber from Nome.

According to Arthur Ahkinga, who lived on Little Diomede island at the turn of the 1940s, the Iñupiat on the island made their living by hunting and carving ivory that they traded or sold. They caught fish such as bullheads, tomcods and blue cods. Whaling was still a major practice. During the winter, they used fur parkas and skin mukluks made out of hunted animals to protect themselves from the cold and wind. Recreational activities included skating, snowshoeing, basketball, handball, soccer and Inuit dancing. After dark, people spent the rest of the evening telling jokes and stories. In summer time, they traveled with skin boats equipped with outboard motors to Siberia or Wales, Alaska. Winter travel was limited to neighboring Big Diomede due to weather conditions. Between July and October, half of the population went to Nome to sell their carvings and skins and trade for supplies.

Despite being separated by the new border after the Alaska Purchase in 1867, Big Diomede had been home to families now living on Little Diomede, and the people living on the American side of the border were close relatives to those living on the Russian side. The communities on both islands were separated by politics but connected by family kinships. Despite being officially forbidden, the Inuit from both islands occasionally visited their neighbors, sometimes under the cover of fog, to meet their relatives and exchange small gifts. The local schoolteachers on Little Diomede counted 178 people from Big Diomede and the Siberian mainland who visited the island within six months, between January and July in 1944.

At the beginning of the Cold War in the late 1940s, Big Diomede became a USSR (Soviet Union) military base, and all its native residents were removed to mainland Russia. When people from Little Diomede went too close to the Russian side or tried to visit their relatives on the neighboring island during World War II, they were arrested. According to one of the survivors, Oscar Ahkinga, after 52 days of internment and interrogation, the Iñupiat were banished and told not to come back.

=== 1950s ===
The school year 1953–1954 on Little Diomede Island was adapted to better serve the local needs. Teaching took place throughout the holidays and also on some weekends in order to complete the 180 days of schooling before the walrus migration started in Spring. The annual walrus hunt was a major source of supplies and income and required the help of all inhabitants. The primary language at the time was Inupiat, and students were also taught English. The only means of communicating with the outside world was by so-called "Bush Phone," provided through the Alaska Communication System station in Nome. Previously non-existent health care was improved with basic medication knowledge provided by seasonal teachers.

=== 1970s ===
During the seventies, the village on Little Diomede was gradually inhabited as a permanent settlement and the entire island was incorporated into the city of Diomede in 1970.

A new, larger church building built by Father Thomas Carlin and Brother Ignatius Jakes was completed on March 3, 1979.

=== 1980s ===
On August 7, 1987, American swimmer Lynne Cox swam between American Little Diomede Island and then Soviet Big Diomede Island. Cox performed the swim as a peace gesture, hoping to help improve American-Soviet relations during the final years of the Cold War. Later that year the Soviet Secretary General Gorbachev travelled to Washington to sign a nuclear weapons treaty with American President Reagan. After the signing ceremony Gorbachev raised his glass and proposed a toast to Lynne Cox, the swimmer. He said, "She proved by her courage how close to each other our peoples live."

=== 1990s ===
Little Diomede, though a whaling community prior to this, was not included in the formation of the Alaska Eskimo Whaling Commission and its needs were not taken into account in determining the bowhead quota for Inupiat and Yupik because of its remote location. In 1992, Little Diomede was formally recognized as a whaling community, per the AEWC.

After the Cold War ended in December 1991, interest in reuniting with families across the Bering Strait grew. In 1994, the people of Little Diomede island collected cash and groceries while local dancers practiced almost every night as the islanders prepared for a visit of more than one hundred friends and relatives from Siberia for which they wanted to be hospitable and generous hosts.

== Demographics ==
Historical population
Census	Pop.	Note	%±
1880	40		—
1890	85		112.5%
1910	90		—
1920	101		12.2%
1930	139		37.6%
1940	129		−7.2%
1950	103		−20.2%
1960	89		−13.6%
1970	84		−5.6%
1980	139		65.5%
1990	178		28.1%
2000	146		−18.0%
2010	115		−21.2%
2020	83		−27.8%
U.S. Decennial Census

Diomede first appeared on the 1880 U.S. Census as the unincorporated Inuit village of Inalit. It returned as "Ignaluk" on the 1890 census. It next appeared on the 1910-40 censuses as "Little Diomede Island." In 1950, it returned as Diomede. It was incorporated as a city in 1970. Diomede also appears on the census as Inalik, designated as an Alaska Native Village Statistical Area (ANVSA).

=== Racial and ethnic composition ===
Diomede city, Alaska – Racial and ethnic composition Note: the US Census treats Hispanic/Latino as an ethnic category. This table excludes Latinos from the racial categories and assigns them to a separate category. Hispanics/Latinos may be of any race.
Race / Ethnicity (NH = Non-Hispanic)	Pop 2000	Pop 2010	Pop 2020	% 2000	% 2010	% 2020
White alone (NH)	9	5	2	6.16%	4.35%	2.41%
Black or African American alone (NH)	0	0	0	0.00%	0.00%	0.00%
Native American or Alaska Native alone (NH)	135	106	72	92.47%	92.17%	86.75%
Asian alone (NH)	0	0	1	0.00%	0.00%	1.20%
Native Hawaiian or Pacific Islander alone (NH)	0	0	0	0.00%	0.00%	0.00%
Other race alone (NH)	0	0	1	0.00%	0.00%	1.20%
Mixed race or Multiracial (NH)	2	4	7	1.37%	3.48%	8.43%
Hispanic or Latino (any race)	0	0	2	0.00%	0.00%	2.41%
Total	146	115	83	100.00%	100.00%	100.00%

=== 2020 census ===
As of the 2020 census, Diomede had a population of 83. The median age was 29.2 years. 39.8% of residents were under the age of 18 and 7.2% of residents were 65 years of age or older. For every 100 females there were 97.6 males, and for every 100 females age 18 and over there were 150.0 males age 18 and over.

0.0% of residents lived in urban areas, while 100.0% lived in rural areas.

There were 30 households in Diomede, of which 30.0% had children under the age of 18 living in them. Of all households, 13.3% were married-couple households, 56.7% were households with a male householder and no spouse or partner present, and 13.3% were households with a female householder and no spouse or partner present. About 53.3% of all households were made up of individuals and 13.3% had someone living alone who was 65 years of age or older.

There were 49 housing units, of which 38.8% were vacant. The homeowner vacancy rate was 0.0% and the rental vacancy rate was 38.9%.

== Community ==
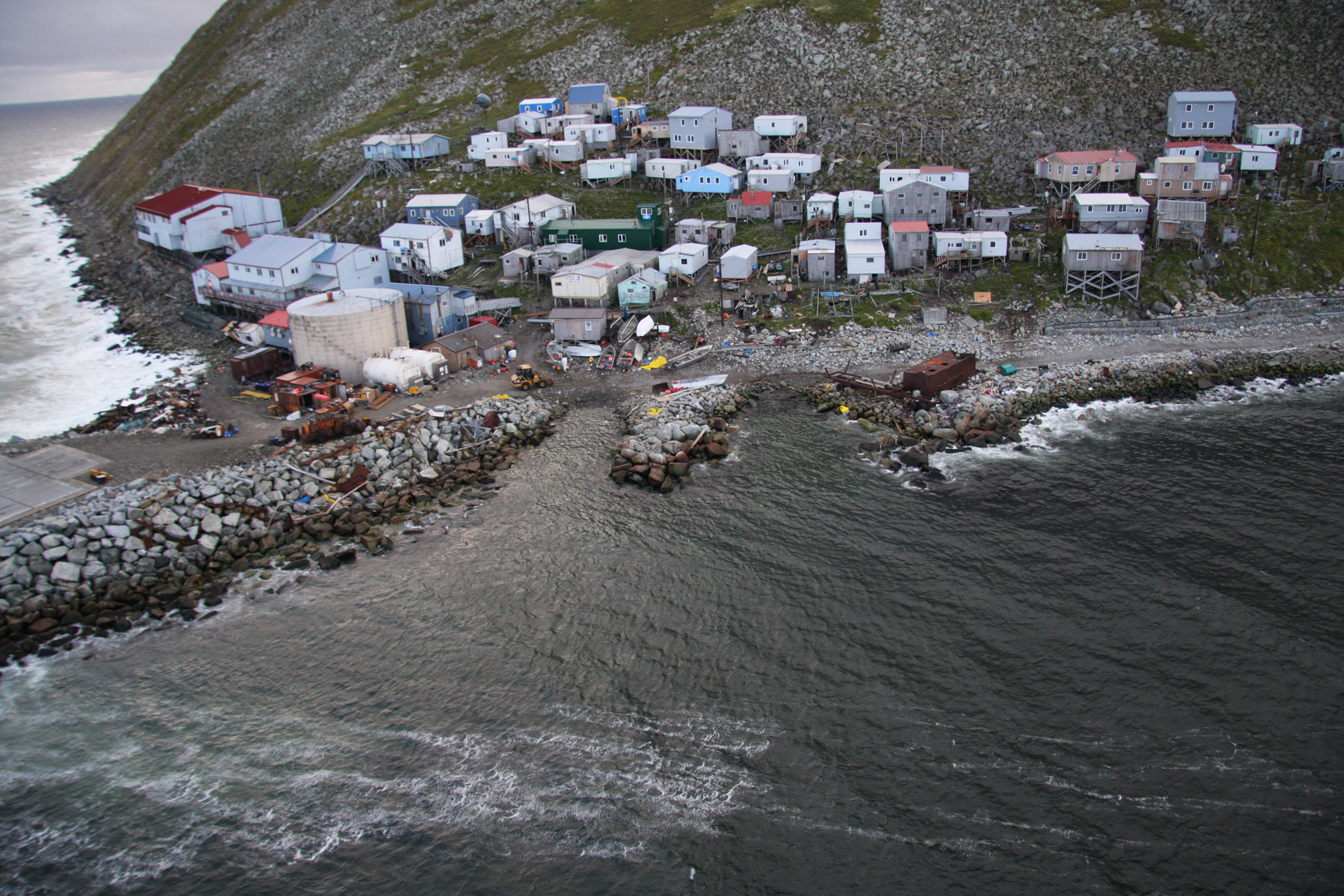
Little Diomede Island village

=== Electricity ===
An electric system was built on the island in the 1970s, and electricity is provided by city-operated Diomede Joint Utilities. They provide houses and other facilities with electricity produced by diesel generators. Diesel fuel is stored in large tanks, which are placed at the furthest possible location from the housing. While the electric facility owns the largest fuel tank, measuring 80,000 U.S. gallons (300,000 L; 67,000 imp gal), the school and the council store both own tanks measuring about 41,000 U.S. gallons (160,000 L; 34,000 imp gal) each.

=== Water and disposal ===
Water for winter use is drawn from a mountain spring, then treated and stored in 434,000-U.S.-gallon (1,640 m^{3}) storage tanks. Because the permafrost prevents pipelines from being installed underground, residents must manually carry water from the tank.

Funds for improving the water system have been requested both by the city and the school. Having a separate tank for the school would decrease the usage of city water and would also serve as a backup water supply for the whole city. Funds have also been requested for improvements to refuse collection and for an incinerator, because the ground conditions on the island limits waste disposal to burning combustibles and disposing of everything else on the ice. Honeybuckets and privies are used, except in the laundromat, clinic, and school, which are served by a septic system.

=== Education ===
The island's only school is likely the most isolated school in the United States. The Diomede School has 22 students from grades pre-K through 12 and four teachers. It is part of the Bering Strait School District.

=== Health care and emergency services ===
There is no hospital located on the island, and emergency services are limited due to the remoteness of the island. A city council-owned clinic operates in the laundromat building, providing basic health care.

While other emergency services are provided by volunteers and a health aide, the fire and rescue service is provided by Diomede Volunteer Fire Department and First Responders. In case of a major health emergency, patients are airlifted to the mainland hospital in Nome, weather permitting. The closest law enforcement are dispatched from the Alaska State Troopers barracks on the mainland in Nome.

Frozen ground and lack of soil on the rocky island prevents digging graves, so rocks are piled on top of the burial sites instead.

On November 7, 2009, it was announced that one inhabitant was infected with H1N1 swine flu.

=== Businesses ===
The island contains no restaurants or hotels, with the only business being the Diomede Native Store, a small grocery store.

== Economy ==
=== Employment ===
Employment on the island is mostly limited to the city, post office, and school. There have been a few seasonal jobs, such as mining and construction, but recently these have been in decline. The Diomede people are excellent ivory carvers and the city serves as a wholesale agent for the ivory. The inhabitants also hunt whales during spring from openings in the sea ice. Whaling largely ceased from the middle to late 20th century, before resuming again in 1999.

=== Taxes ===
The city levies a 3% sales tax, but there are no property taxes on the island.

== Transportation ==
=== Historical transportation ===
When Alaska was still connected to Siberia over 10,000 years ago by the Bering Land Bridge, the Little Diomede was not an island but was a part of Beringia and accessible by foot. However, it is unknown whether humans visited the grounds of the Little Diomede at that time. Most likely, the first visitors came when it had become an island, simply by foot on top of the sea ice. Later, Umiaks were used to visit the neighboring Big Diomede island for whale hunting and fishing, and later, to access mainland Alaska and Siberia. Boats made out of driftwood and whale skin are still used today.

In the early 1940s, one of the Little Diomede residents wrote "No airplane comes to Diomede except for some very special reason, during the winter. The MS North Star brings groceries for the people on the island from Nome. At the same time she unloads freight for the school teachers. The Coast Guard cutter Northland comes in twice during the summer to look after the natives".

=== Internal transport ===
There are no roads, highways, railroads, or internal waterways on the island. There are ancient but faint rocky trails heading north and south from the City of Diomede. There are also trails between the buildings. In the fall of 2008, many of the footpaths within the city were replaced by a system of boardwalks and stairs.

=== External transport ===
Mail has been delivered to the island by helicopter since 1982 and is currently delivered weekly (up until 2013, mail was delivered by plane more frequently in winter months when the ice runway allowed for more deliveries). The postal contract is one of the oldest in the nation, the only one that uses helicopters for delivering mail, and with a cost of over $300,000 annually, is the most expensive in Alaska.

An annual delivery of goods and supplies is made by barge during the summer, which usually is the only cargo delivered during the year. When the supplies come, all the men rush down and pull them off and carry them up.

Due to its location and weather conditions, transportation to the island is very expensive. Having very few economic development opportunities and a tight budget, the city charges non-business visitors arriving by plane or boat a $50.00 fee.

When U.S. Senator Ted Stevens arrived to the island on October 29, 2002, for an overnight visit, he commented "I did not realize you were this remote". He arrived by a National Guard Blackhawk helicopter, and it was the first time the island was visited by a statewide elected official.

==== Helicopter ====
Since 2012, the United States Department of Transportation has subsidized scheduled weekly passenger service via helicopter between Diomede Heliport and Nome Airport.

Airlines	Destinations
Pathfinder Aviation	Nome

== See also ==
- Indigenous peoples of Siberia
- Yupik peoples
