= Little Diomede Island =

Island in the Bering Strait off Alaska, U.S.

Little Diomede
Native name: Iŋaliq (Inupiaq)
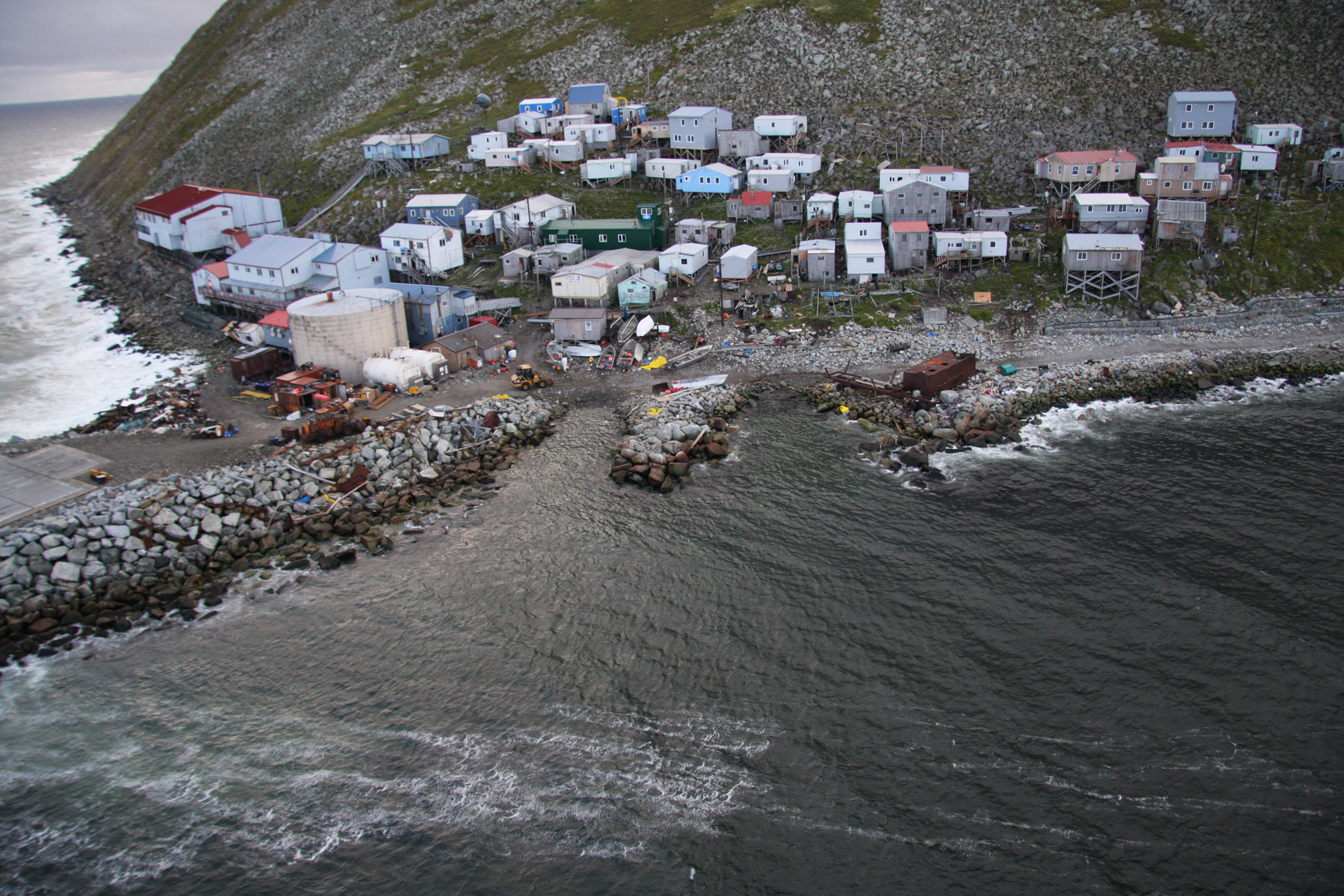
- The native Iñupiat village of Diomede/Iŋaliq on Little Diomede Island

- Location within Alaska

Geography
- Location: Bering Strait
- Coordinates: 65°45′15″N 168°55′15″W
- Archipelago: Diomede Islands
- Area: 2.43 sq mi (6.3 km^{2})
- Highest elevation: 1,621 ft (494.1 m)

Administration
- United States

Demographics
- Population: 77 (2023)
- Pop. density: 33.72/sq mi (13.019/km^{2})
- Ethnic groups: 96% Iŋaliq Iñupiaq

Additional information
- Time zone: Alaska: UTC −9/−8

Little Diomede Island (Inupiaq: Iŋaliq), formerly known as Krusenstern Island, after Adam Johann von Krusenstern, (Russian: остров Крузенштерна, romanized: ostrov Kruzenshterna), (Note: Krusenstern Island may also refer to other places; see Krusenstern Island (disambiguation)) is an inhabited island of Alaska. It is the smaller of the two Diomede Islands located in the Bering Strait between the Alaskan mainland and Siberia. The island has one town, also called Diomede.

The island is a day behind Big Diomede Island because they are separated by the International Date Line; as a result, it is sometimes referred to as Yesterday Island.

== Etymology ==
The Diomede Islands are named after Saint Diomedes. The Inupiaq name Iŋaliq means "the other one" or "the one over there". The two islands are respectively nicknamed "Yesterday Island" (Little Diomede Island) and "Tomorrow Island" (Big Diomede Island) because the International Date Line runs between them, making the date on Little Diomede Island always one day behind the date on Big Diomede Island.

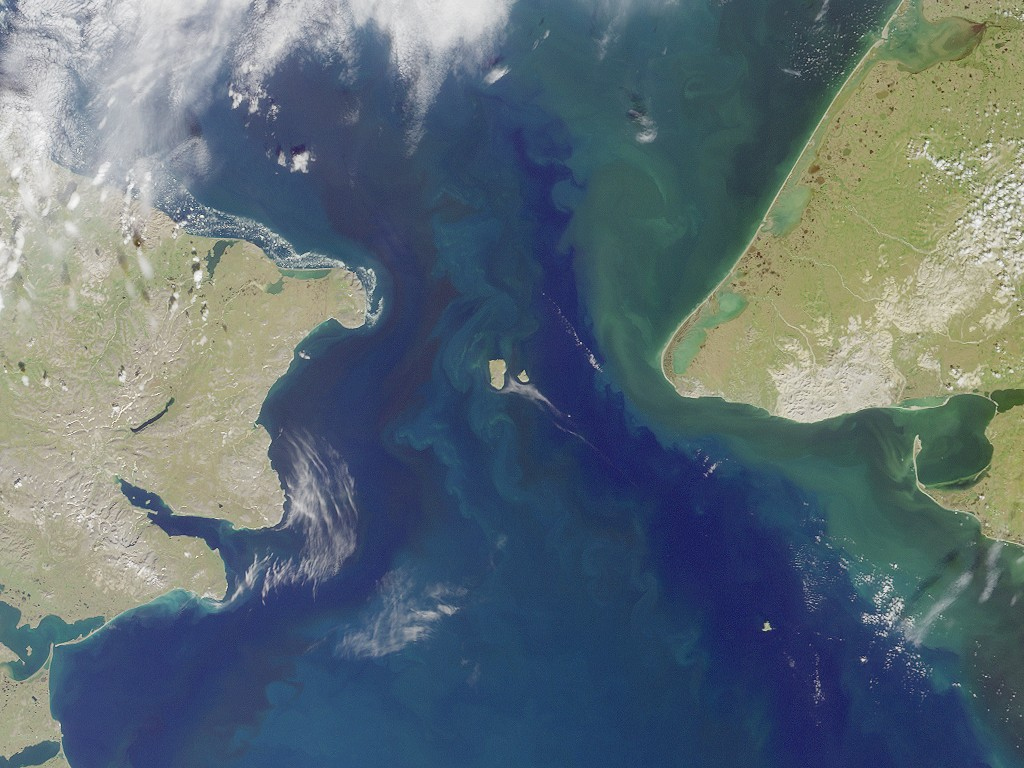
Satellite image of the Bering Strait; Little Diomede Island can be clearly seen in the middle of the strait, to the right of Big Diomede

== Geography ==
Little Diomede Island is located about 16 miles (25 km) west of mainland Alaska, in the middle of the Bering Strait. It is only 0.4 miles (0.6 km) from the International Date Line and about 2.4 miles (3.9 km) from the Russian island of Big Diomede. According to the United States Census Bureau, the island has a total area of 2.8 sq mi (7.3 km^{2}), all of it land. On the western shore of the island is the village of Diomede, also known as Iŋaliq. The highest point on Little Diomede Island is 1,621 feet (494 m) (about halfway along the west coast, about 1.5 miles (2.4 km) south-east of the village, facing the southern tip of Big Diomede). The island has very scant vegetation.

Big Diomede is within the view of Little Diomede, meaning Russia can be seen from Alaska.

=== Geology ===
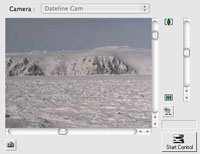
Webcam across the Bering Strait

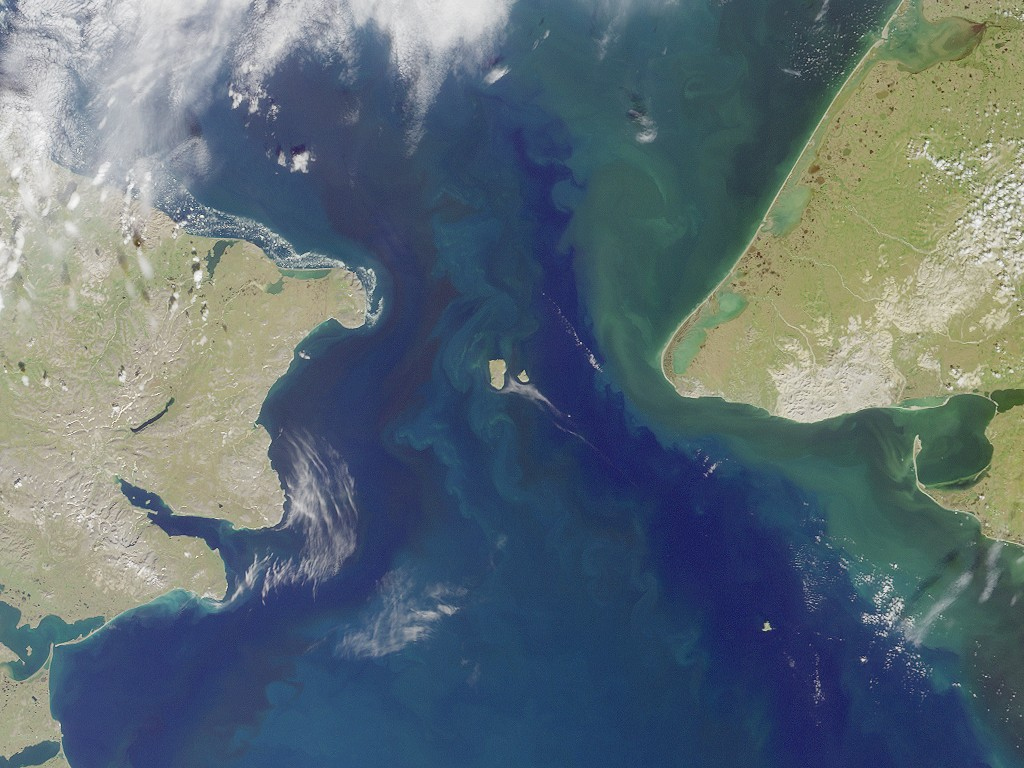
The Bering Strait area: Little Diomede Island can be clearly seen in the middle of the strait, to the right of Big Diomede.

Little Diomede island is composed of Cretaceous age granite or quartz monzonite. The location of the settlement is the only area which does not have near-vertical cliffs to the water. Behind the settlement, and around the entire island, rocky slopes rise at about 40° up to the relatively flattened top in 1,148–1,191 ft (350–363 m). The island has scant vegetation.

=== Important Bird Area ===
The island, along with its surrounding waters, has been designated an Important Bird Area (IBA) by BirdLife International because of its significant seabird colonies, including those of black-legged kittiwakes, and of parakeet, least and crested auklets.

=== Climate ===
Summer temperatures average 40 to 50 °F (4 to 10 °C). Winter temperatures average from 6 to 10 °F (−14 to −12 °C). Annual precipitation averages 10 inches (250 mm), and annual snowfall averages 30 inches (76 cm). During summer months, cloudy skies and fog prevail. Winds blow consistently from the north, averaging 15 knots (17 mph; 28 km/h), with gusts of 60 to 80 miles per hour (97–129 km/h). The Bering Strait is generally frozen between mid-December and mid-June.

Although slightly south of the Arctic Circle, the island has a dry-summer polar climate (Köppen ETs), because the driest high-sun month (April) has less than one-third as much precipitation as the wettest high-sun month (October). Winters are icy and cold — colder than those of nearby Nome, despite Little Diomede’s island location — due to its greater proximity and exposure to exceedingly cold Siberian air masses. The extreme moderating effect of the thawed Bering Sea produces very cool summers, as well. The overall cooling result is that most plants are unable to grow. The hottest summer on record reached a maximum temperature of only 73 °F (22.8 °C).

Climate data for Diomede, Alaska
Month	Jan	Feb	Mar	Apr	May	Jun	Jul	Aug	Sep	Oct	Nov	Dec	Year
Record high °F (°C)	53 (12)	47 (8)	42 (6)	48 (9)	56 (13)	67 (19)	72 (22)	73 (23)	65 (18)	54 (12)	45 (7)	44 (7)	73 (23)
Mean daily maximum °F (°C)	7 (−14)	4 (−16)	5 (−15)	16 (−9)	32 (0)	43 (6)	52 (11)	55 (13)	44 (7)	33 (1)	22 (−6)	10 (−12)	27 (−3)
Mean daily minimum °F (°C)	−7 (−22)	−9 (−23)	−8 (−22)	3 (−16)	23 (−5)	34 (1)	43 (6)	43 (6)	37 (3)	25 (−4)	11 (−12)	−2 (−19)	16 (−9)
Record low °F (°C)	−44 (−42)	−44 (−42)	−42 (−41)	−32 (−36)	−11 (−24)	20 (−7)	24 (−4)	30 (−1)	23 (−5)	−5 (−21)	−28 (−33)	−35 (−37)	−44 (−42)
Average precipitation inches (mm)	0.41 (10)	0.45 (11)	0.48 (12)	0.27 (6.9)	0.54 (14)	0.73 (19)	1.47 (37)	2.46 (62)	1.99 (51)	1.41 (36)	0.68 (17)	0.52 (13)	11.41 (288.9)
Average snowfall inches (cm)	4.3 (11)	4.1 (10)	6 (15)	3 (7.6)	2.8 (7.1)	0.2 (0.51)	0.3 (0.76)	0 (0)	1.2 (3.0)	6.3 (16)	8 (20)	5.3 (13)	41.5 (103.97)

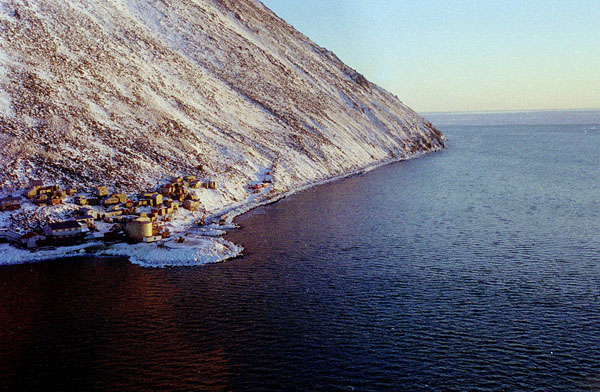
Diomede (Inalik) village on the west coast of Little Diomede Island, Alaska

== History ==
Danish-Russian navigator Vitus Bering (after whom the Bering Strait is named) sighted the Diomede Islands on August 16 (O.S., August 27 N.S.), 1728, the day on which the Russian Orthodox Church celebrates the memory of Diomedes of Tarsus.

Little Diomede was sold to the United States by the Russian Empire, along with the rest of Alaska, in 1867. Inuit from Big and Little Diomede continued to cross between the two islands until the Soviet Union closed its border at Big Diomede in 1948. This section of the border between the United States and the Soviet Union became known as the "Ice Curtain" during the Cold War.

The Inuit of Big Diomede were resettled in coastal villages of Chukotka. There has been limited subsequent contact between the communities. There were sporadic contacts during the 1970s with former inhabitants of Big Diomede who walked across the Bering Strait to trade and exchange information across the International Date Line.

Lynne Cox swam from Little Diomede to Big Diomede (about 2.2 miles (3.5 km)) in August 1987. She was congratulated jointly by Mikhail Gorbachev and Ronald Reagan. Visits by the inhabitants of Little Diomede to find relatives deported from Big Diomede resumed during Perestroika. There were subsequent exchanges during the 1990s. These have become increasingly rare as relations between the United States and Russia have worsened.

== Access ==
There is a heliport, the Diomede Heliport, with regular helicopter flights. In the past, locals carved a runway into the thick ice sheet so that bush planes could deliver vital products, such as medicine and grocery supplies. Annual variations of the ice sheet meant that the runway would change position every year, however access by plane has ceased due to climate change causing the thinning of the winter ice around Little Diomede.

== In popular culture ==
Little Diomede was featured in the first episode of Full Circle with Michael Palin, a 1997 BBC documentary series in which the broadcaster Michael Palin traversed many of the countries of the Pacific Rim. The Diomede Islands are also featured in the novel Further Tales of the City, by Armistead Maupin, and the miniseries based on the book. In addition, Alexander Armstrong visited the island as part of his 2015 series Land of the Midnight Sun. Little Diomede was also featured in the 1952 film Arctic Flight, starring Wayne Morris and Lola Albright. The islands are also referenced in The Last Frontier.

== See also ==
- List of islands of Alaska
- List of islands of the United States
- USSR–USA Maritime Boundary Agreement
