= Big Diomede Island =

Island in the Bering Strait, territory of Russia

Big Diomede
Russian: Остров Ратманова; Inupiaq: Imaqłiq
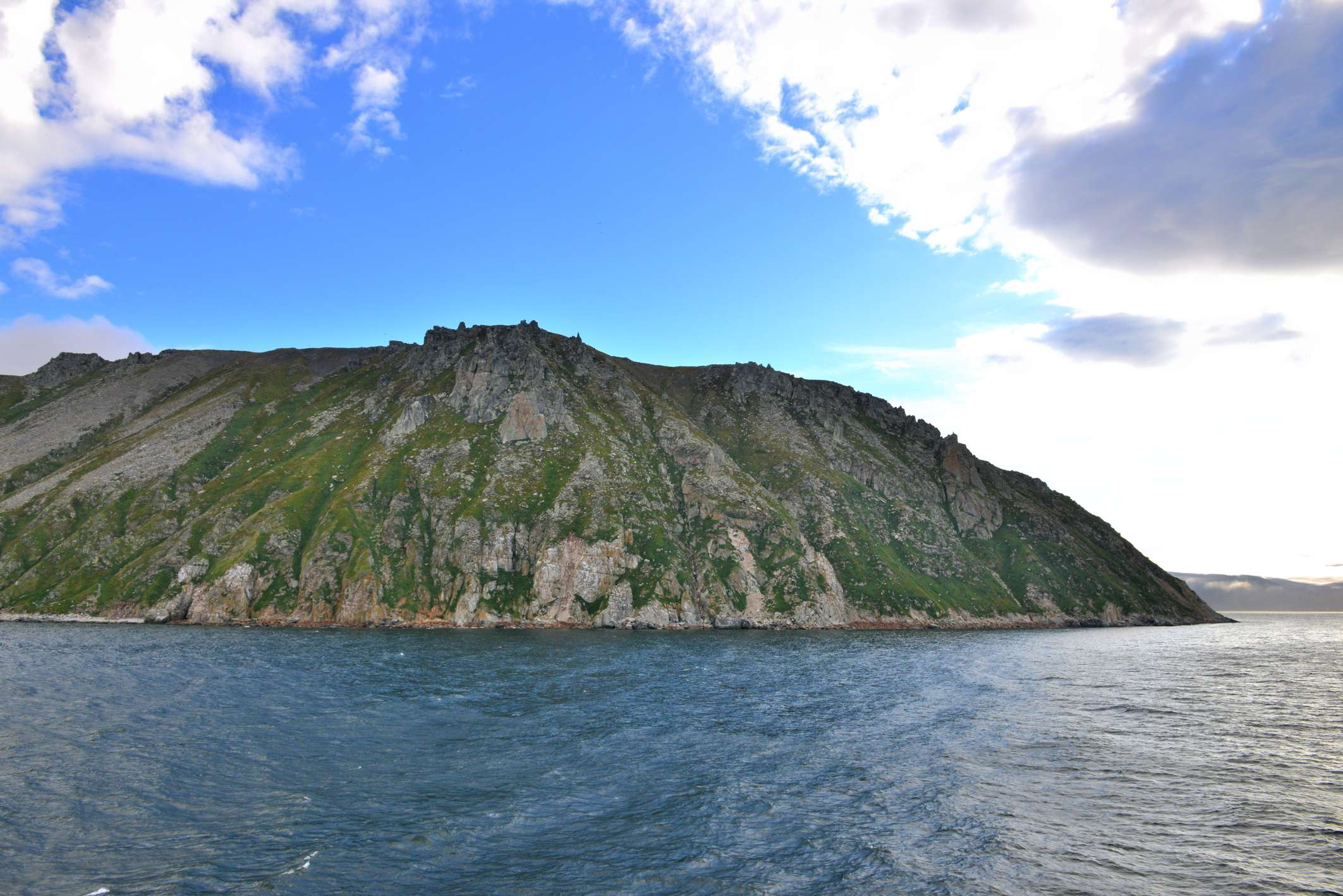
- Big Diomede, 2014
- Interactive map of Big Diomede

Geography
- Location: Bering Strait
- Coordinates: 65°46′52″N 169°03′25″W
- Archipelago: Diomede Islands
- Area: 29 km^{2} (11 sq mi)
- Highest elevation: 477.3168 m (1566 ft)

Administration
- Russia

Demographics
- Population: 0 (permanent inhabitants)
- Ethnic groups: Iñupiat (formerly)

Additional information
- Time zone: Kamchatka Time – UTC+12

Big Diomede Island or Ratmanov Island (Russian: Остров Ратманова, romanized: ostrov Ratmanova; Chukot: Имэлин; Inupiaq: Imaqłiq) is the western island of the two Diomede Islands in the middle of the Bering Strait. The island is home to a Russian military base, which is located midway along the island's north shore. The island is a part of the Chukotsky District of the Chukotka Autonomous Okrug of Russia. The border separating Russia and the United States runs north–south through the four-kilometer-wide strait that runs between the two islands.

The island is almost a day ahead of Little Diomede Island because they are separated by the International Date Line; as a result, it is sometimes referred to as Tomorrow Island.

== Geography ==
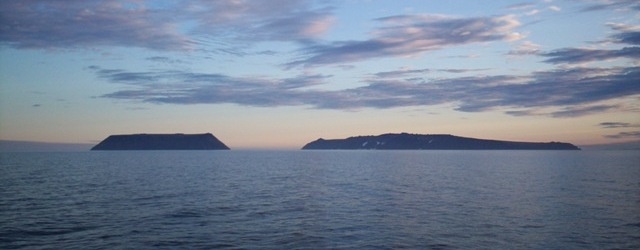
An image of the Diomede Islands from the north: Big Diomede is the right landmass

Big Diomede Island is located about 45 kilometres (28 mi) southeast of Cape Dezhnev on the Chukchi Peninsula and is Russia's easternmost point by direction of travel. It is west of the International Date Line, although in the western hemisphere by longitude. The coordinates are 65°46′52″N 169°03′25″W. The rocky tuya-type island has an area of about 29 km^{2} (11 sq mi) The International Date Line is about 1.3 kilometres (0.81 mi) east of the island. The highest point of the island is Krysha peak standing 505 metres (1,657 ft) tall. There is a weather station on the north coast at 65°48′50″N 169°02′5″W. There is a helipad at 65°48′36″N 169°01′46″W.

== History ==
The island was originally inhabited by Iñupiat. The First Alaskans Institute says: "The people of the Diomede and King Islands are Inupiat".

The first European to reach the islands was the Russian explorer Semyon Dezhnyov in 1648. Vitus Bering landed on the Diomede Islands on August 16, 1728, the day on which the Russian Orthodox Church celebrates the memory of the martyr St. Diomede.

In 1732, the Russian geodesist Mikhail Gvozdev plotted the island's map.

In 1867, during the Alaska Purchase, the new border between the nations was drawn between the Big Diomede and Little Diomede islands.

=== 20th century ===
During World War II, Big Diomede became a military base, and remained so for some time into the Cold War.

After World War II, the native population was forced off Big Diomede Island to the mainland in order to avoid contacts across the border. They first moved to the Yupik village of Naukan That village was evicted between 1954 and 1958, so residents were relocated elsewhere. In 2015, an attempt was made to reunite people from the two islands.

Today, unlike Alaska's neighboring Little Diomede Island, it has no permanent native population, but it is the site of a Russian weather station and a base of Border Service of the Federal Security Service of the Russian Federation troops (FSB).

During the Cold War, the section of the border between the U.S. and the USSR separating Big and Little Diomede became known as the "Ice Curtain". On 7 August 1987, however, Lynne Cox, an American long-distance swimmer, swam from Little Diomede to Big Diomede (approximately 3.5 km or 2.2 mi) in ice-cold waters. She was congratulated jointly by Soviet Premier Mikhail Gorbachev and U.S. President Ronald Reagan four months later at the signing of the INF Missile Treaty at the White House, when Gorbachev made a toast. He and President Reagan lifted their glasses and Gorbachev said: "Last summer it took one brave American by the name of Lynne Cox just two hours to swim from one of our countries to the other. We saw on television how sincere and friendly the meeting was between our people and the Americans when she stepped onto the Soviet shore. She proved by her courage how close to each other our peoples live".

==== Lisunov Li-2 crash ====
On 13 June 1971, a Lisunov Li-2 belonging to the Soviet Border Troops crashed in the centre of the island. All crew members were injured but survived and the green hull remains at 65.7783°N 169.0666°W.

== Fauna ==
Eleven species of birds including such as puffins and guillemots have been found on Big Diomede. The island, along with its surrounding waters, has been designated an Important Bird Area (IBA) by BirdLife International because of its significant seabird colonies, including those of horned puffins, and of parakeet, least and crested auklets. In 1976 a rufous hummingbird was identified on the island. This finding, unique so far in Russia, was very likely due to a dispersed specimen.

For mammals, pinnipeds (e.g. ringed and bearded seals, walruses) and cetaceans (e.g. gray and rarer bowhead whales) inhabit the waters around the island.

== See also ==
- List of islands of Russia
