= Lalibela Airport =

Airport in Lalibela, Amhara Region, Ethiopia

- IATA: LLI; ICAO: HALL

Summary
- Airport type: Public
- Operator: Ethiopian Airports Enterprise
- Serves: Lalibela, Ethiopia
- Elevation AMSL: 1,958 m (6,424 ft)
- Coordinates: 11°58′26″N 038°59′28″E

Map
- Location within Ethiopia

Runways
Direction	Length		Surface
Direction	m	ft	Surface
10/28	2,400	7,874	Asphalt

Lalibela Airport (IATA: LLI, ICAO: HALL) is a public airport serving Lalibela, a town in the Amhara Region of northern Ethiopia. The name of the town and airport may also be transliterated as Lalibella. The airport is located 23 km (14 miles) southwest of the town.

== Facilities ==
The Lalibela Airport lies at an elevation of 1,958 metres (6,424 ft) above mean sea level. It has one runway designated 10/28, with an asphalt surface measuring 2,400 by 53 metres (7,874 ft × 174 ft).

The main runway was rebuilt in 1997, at a cost of 53 million birr.

== Airlines and destinations ==
Airlines	Destinations
Ethiopian Airlines	Addis Ababa, Axum, Bahir Dar, Gondar

== Airport and incidents ==
=== Ethiopian Civil War ===
On 14 March 1975, a Douglas C-47 ET-ABR of Ethiopian Airlines was destroyed on the ground during a clash with rebels.
