= Baron Loicq de Lobel =

French engineer

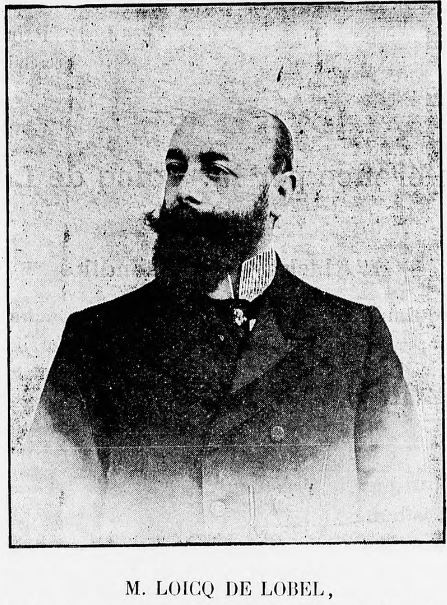

Léon Loicq de Lobel, sometimes referred to as Baron Loicq de Lobel, was a French engineer and aristocrat, primarily known for his briefly popular proposal in 1906 to build a bridge-and-tunnel link between Siberia and Alaska.

In 1898, de Lobel visited the Klondike region as an agent of the French government. In 1899, de Lobel authored Le Klondyke, l'Alaska, le Yukon et les Iles Aléoutiennes, a 48-page piece originally published in the Bulletin de la Société de Géographie. The work was published as a separate volume in 1899, and reprinted in 1923. The work is a simple account of de Lobel's voyage in those regions.

In August 1906, the Czar Nicholas II of Russia issued an order authorising a Franco-American syndicate represented by de Lobel to begin work on the Trans-Siberian Alaska railroad project, involving bridging and tunnelling in the Bering Strait.
