= Elizabeth (elephant seal) =

Individual elephant seal

Elizabeth was an elephant seal that lived in the Christchurch, New Zealand, Avon / Ōtākaro and Ōpāwaho / Heathcote rivers beginning in the late 1970s until her death in 1985. She would sunbathe on the riverbanks, often in Dallington, but she also made an appearance at Taylors Mistake. She would occasionally get onto the roads, even getting hit by a car in 1985, but she was not injured. The Ministry of Transport would scare her into going into the Heathcote River using sirens and lights, but the Marine Mammals Protection Act 1978 prevented authorities from "disturbing" her. In 1985 Elizabeth died on Scarborough Beach, to a viral infection, according to an autopsy.

== Children's book ==
In 2014, American long distance swimmer and author Lynne Cox published a children's picture book about Elizabeth, named Elizabeth, Queen of the Seas. The book is fictional but is based on real events. Cox learnt about Elizabeth in 1983 when she was in Christchurch and was asked if she was looking for the elephant seal. In the book, Elizabeth is named "Queen of the Seas" by the residents of Christchurch. Elizabeth is almost hit by a car however, leading authorities to move her hundreds of kilometres away three times, but each time the sea elephant swims back to the river.
