= Hong Sung-taek =

South Korean mountaineer (born 1966)

Hong, Sung Taek
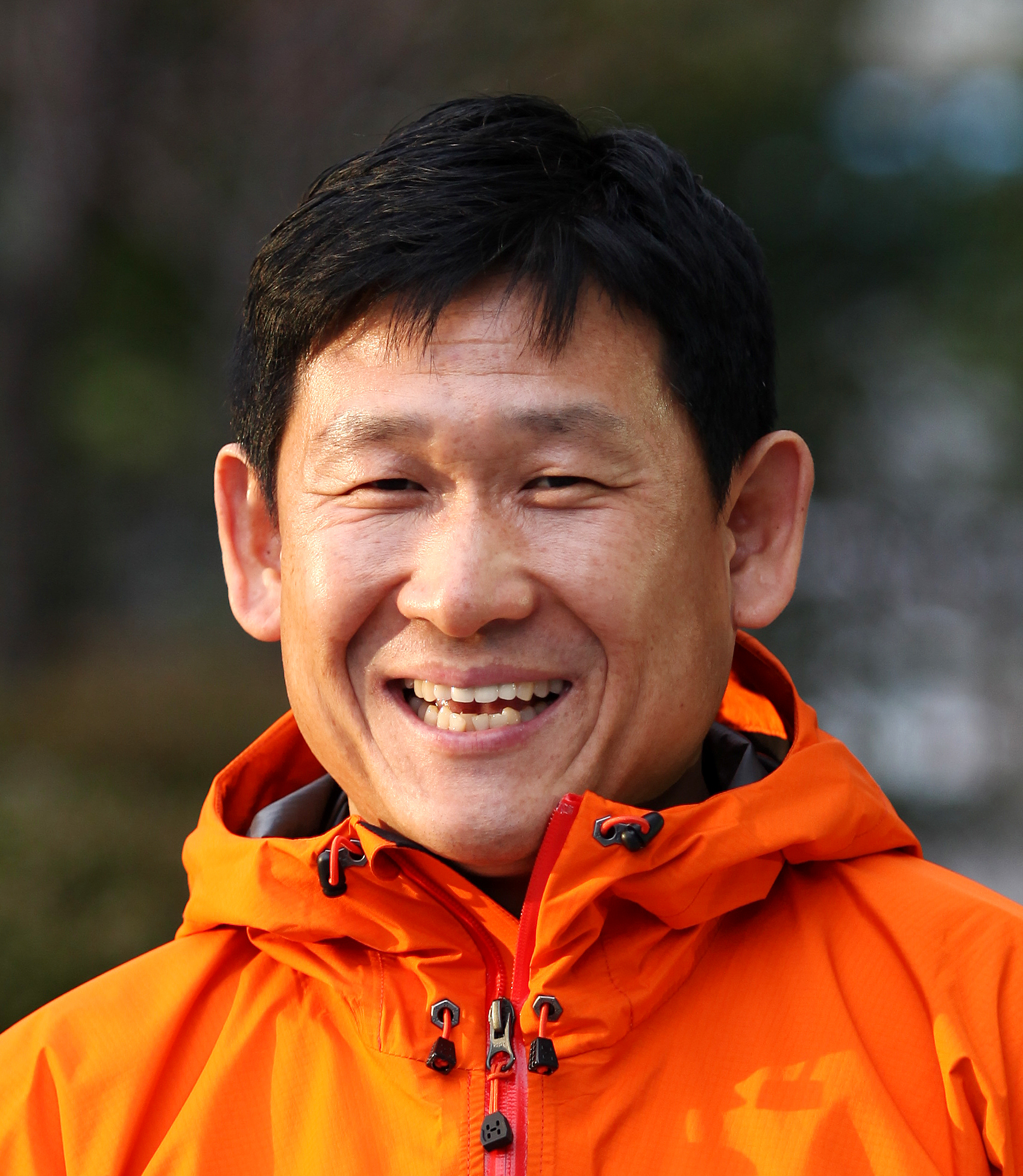

Personal information
- Nationality: South Korean
- Born: 13 March 1966 (age 60) Gumi, North Gyeongsang, South Korea
- Website: hongs-expedition.com Defytime & GCK

Climbing career
- Known for: mountaineer, adventurer, explorer

Hong, Sung Taek (Korean: 홍성택; Hanja: 洪成澤; born 13 March 1966) is a mountaineer, adventurer, explorer and author from South Korea. He is currently a National Geographic Explorers supported by a National Geographic explorers program and also associated with Defytime and a principal of KSAF Mountaineers Academy. He is renowned for reaching all the Three Poles and crossing the Bering Strait and Greenland for the first time. He summited Everest in 1995, skied to the South Pole in 1994 and walked to the North Pole in 2005. He also crossed Bering Strait by foot in 2012 (official) and crossed Greenland by dog sledding in 2011. He was thus the first in the world to reach all the five poles (Everest, North and South Poles, Bering Straits, Greenland). In 2019, the book "Explorers-amazing tales of the world's greatest adventures" published by UK publisher Penguin Random House DK featured him alongside renowned explorers including Roald Amundsen, Robert Scott, Edmund Hillary etc.

== Expeditions ==
Year	Expeditions
2015	attempt, Lhotse, south face (8516 m)
2014	attempt, Lhotse, south face (8516 m)
2013	attempt, Lhotse (8516 m)
2012	crossing, Bering Strait (by foot) (February 23 ~ 29, 2012)
2011	crossing, Greenland (2500 km) (May ~ July 19, 2011)
2008	attempt, Mount Everest SW (8848 m)
2007	attempt, Lhotse, south face (8516 m) Lhotse Shar(8382 m)
2005	arrived, North Pole (N90) (by foot) (April 30, 2005)
2002	attempt, Pumori, east face (7117 m)
1999	attempt, Lhotse, south face (8516 m)
1998	summit, Thapa Peak (6012 m) (April 18, 1998)
1996	attempt, Dhaulagiri (8167 m) Annapurna (8091 m)
1995	summit, Everest (8848 m) (October 14, 1995)
1995	summit, Shishapangma (8046 m) (August, 1995)
1994	arrived, South Pole (S90) (by ski and walk) (January 1, 1994)
1994	attempt, Pumori, NE (7117 m)
1993	attempt, Everest (8848 m)
1992	summit, Khan Tengri (7010 m) (August 5, 1992)

== Publications ==
- Hong, Sung Taek (2013). 5 Poles. Seoul, Korea: dreamN. ISBN 978-89-88349-41-0.

An essay book telling about the experiences in SP, NP, Everest, Bering and Greenland

- Hong, Sung Taek (2001). The Effects of Himalayan Altitude Experiences on Body Composition. Seoul, Korea: Korea University.

A master's thesis, Korea University, 2001

== Awards ==
2019 World Star Awards Sport/Excellence Award

2001 Korea Expedition Awards

1994 Korea National Sport Merit Medal
