= Diomede Islands =

Islands in the Bering Strait

Russian: острова Диомида; Inupiaq: Iŋaluk
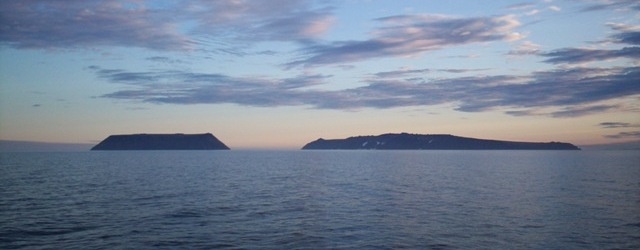
- Diomede Islands: Little Diomede (left, U.S.) and Big Diomede, (right, Russia) viewed from the north, looking south

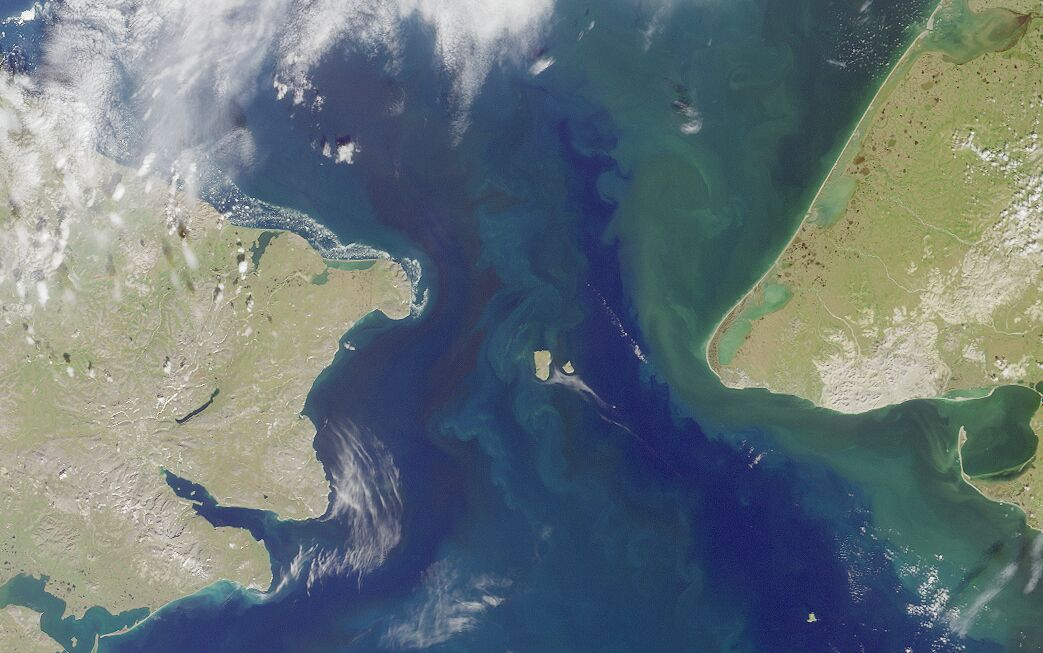
- Satellite photo of the Bering Strait, with the Diomede Islands at center

Geography
- Location: Bering Strait
- Coordinates: 65°47′N 169°01′W
- Total islands: 2
- Area: 35 km^{2} (14 sq mi)

Administration
- Russia / United States

Demographics
- Population: 0 (Big Diomede); 77 (Little Diomede); (January 2023)

Additional information
- Time zones: Alaska Time – UTC -9/-8; Kamchatka Time – UTC+12

The Diomede Islands (/ˌdaɪ.əˈmiːdiː/; Russian: острова́ Диоми́да, romanized: ostrova Diomida), also known in Russia as Gvozdev Islands (Russian: острова́ Гво́здева, romanized: ostrova Gvozdeva), consist of two rocky, mesa-like islands. One is the Russian island of Big Diomede (part of Chukotka). The other is the U.S. island of Little Diomede (part of Alaska). The Diomede Islands are located in the middle of the Bering Strait between mainland Alaska and Siberia. At their closest points, the two islands are approximately 2.4 miles (3.8 km) away from each other.

Because they are separated by the International Date Line, Big Diomede is almost a day ahead of Little Diomede; due to locally defined time zones, Big Diomede is 21 hours ahead of Little Diomede (20 in summer). Because of this, the islands are sometimes called Tomorrow Island (Big Diomede) and Yesterday Island (Little Diomede).

== Etymology ==
The islands are named for the Greek Saint Diomedes; Danish-born Russian navigator Vitus Bering sighted the Diomede Islands on 16 August (O.S., 27 August N.S.) 1728, the day on which the Russian Orthodox Church celebrates the memory of the saint.

== Location ==
The islands are separated by an international border, which also defines the International Date Line in that area, about 1.2 miles (2 km) from each island, at 168°58'37"W. The two islands are about 2.4 miles (3.8 km) apart at their closest points.

Big Diomede Island is the easternmost point of Russia.

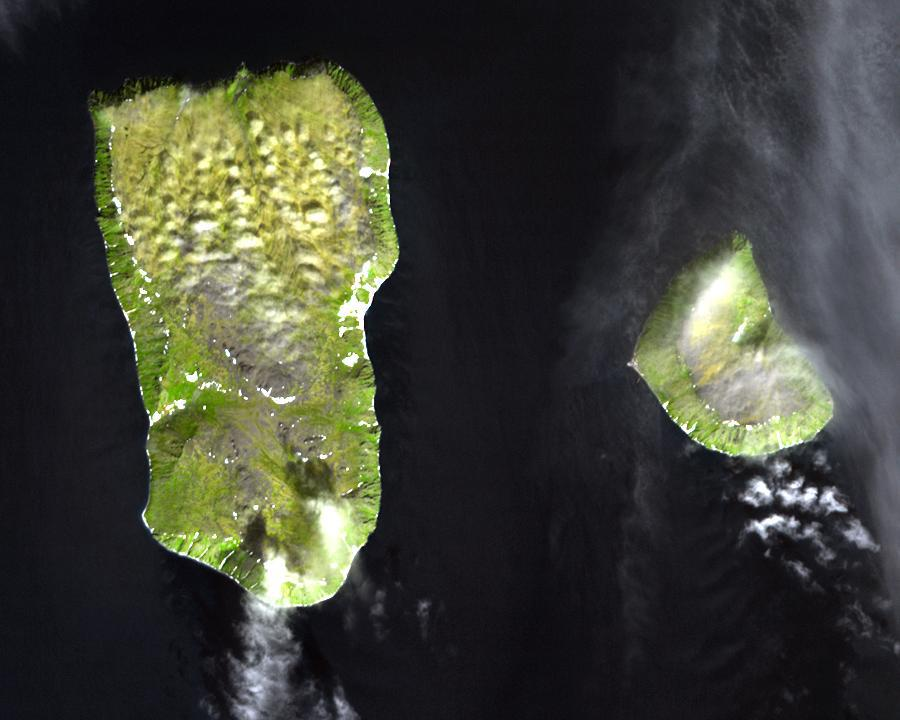
The Diomede Islands, in the Bering Sea

The Diomede Islands are often mentioned as likely intermediate stops for the hypothetical bridge or tunnel (Bering Strait crossing) spanning the Bering Strait.

Under the right winter conditions, an ice bridge spans the distance between the two islands.

== History ==
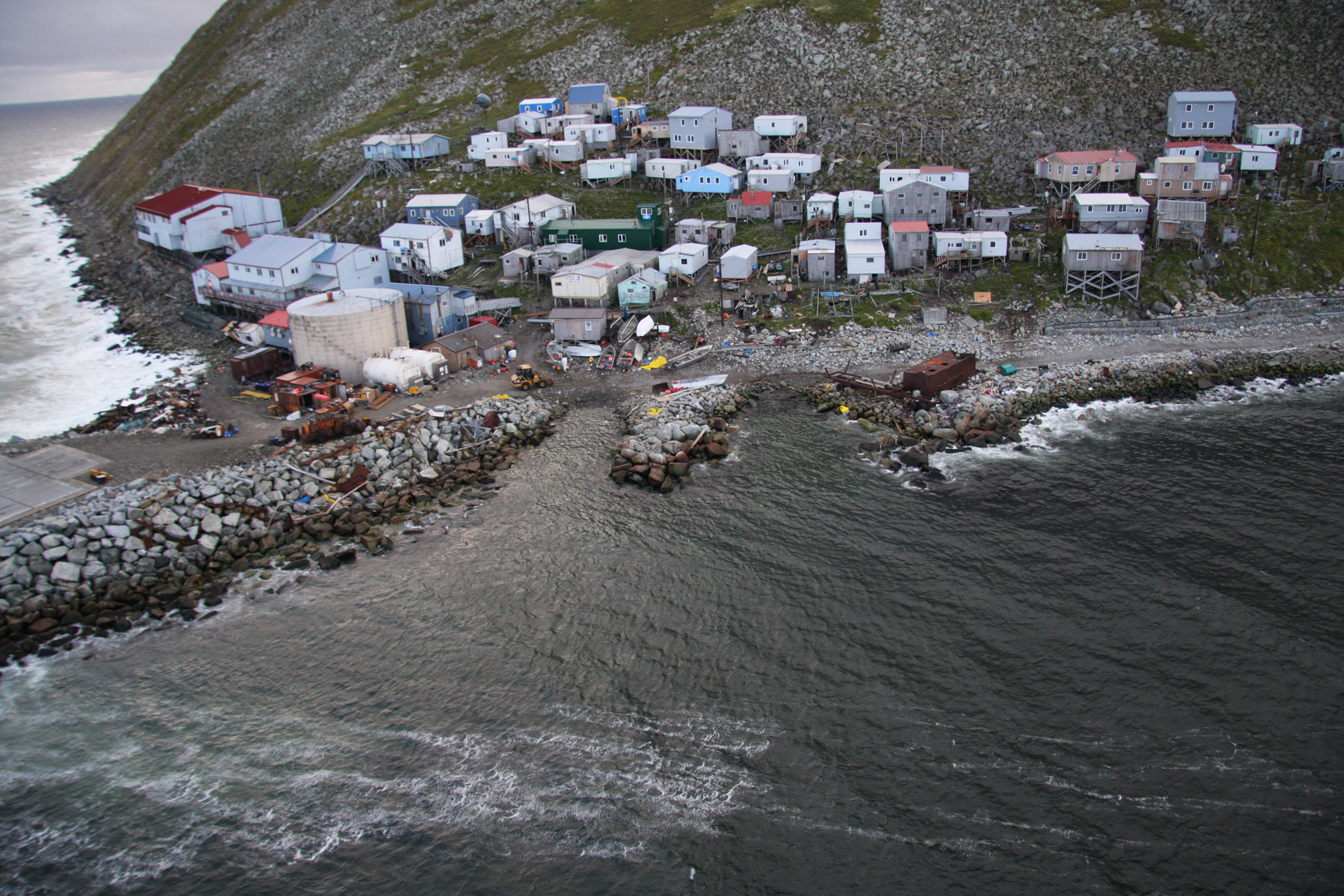
The village of Diomede on the island of Little Diomede in August 2008

The islands were once mountaintops in the central portion of the land mass known as the Bering land bridge.

The first European to reach the Bering Strait was the Russian explorer Semyon Dezhnev in 1648. He reported two islands whose natives had bone lip ornaments, but it is not certain that these were the Diomedes. Danish navigator Vitus Bering discovered the Diomede Islands while leading a Russian expedition on 16 August (O.S., 26 August N.S.) 1728, the day when the Russian Orthodox Church celebrates the memory of the martyr St. Diomede (hence, the name of the islands). In 1732, a Russian geodesist, Mikhail Gvozdev, determined the longitude and latitude of the two islands.

The text of the 1867 treaty between the United States and Russia, which finalized the Alaska Purchase, uses the islands to designate the boundary between the two nations: the border separates "equidistantly Krusenstern Island, or Ignaluk, from Ratmanov Island, or Nunarbuk, and heads northward infinitely until it disappears completely in the Arctic Ocean".

During the Cold War, that gap constituted the border between the United States and the Soviet Union, and became known as the "Ice Curtain". In 1987, however, Lynne Cox swam from one island to the other and was congratulated by both Mikhail Gorbachev and Ronald Reagan for her feat.

In the summer of 1995, British television actor and documentary presenter Michael Palin started his counterclockwise circumnavigation of the Pacific Rim, encompassing 18 countries, on Little Diomede Island, as part of the BBC series Full Circle. He intended to set foot on it again at the end of his eight-month trek but could not because of rough seas.

After establishing a military base there in 1948, the Soviet government relocated the indigenous population of Big Diomede Island to mainland Russia. The island is now inhabited only by military units. Little Diomede had an Inupiat population of 170, which had declined to 115 at the 2010 census, entirely in the village site of Diomede, Alaska on the west side of the island, though the island as a whole comprises the city of Diomede. This village has a school, a post office, and a store. Some residents are famous for their ivory carving. When weather permits, commercial air contact is maintained with the island as part of the US Essential Air Service.

== See also ==
- List of islands of Alaska
- List of islands of Russia
