= Axum Airport =

Airport in Axum, Tigray Region, Ethiopia

Axum Emperor Yohannes IV Airport ኣኽሱም ዮሃንስ ራብዓይ መዕረፍ ነፈርቲ
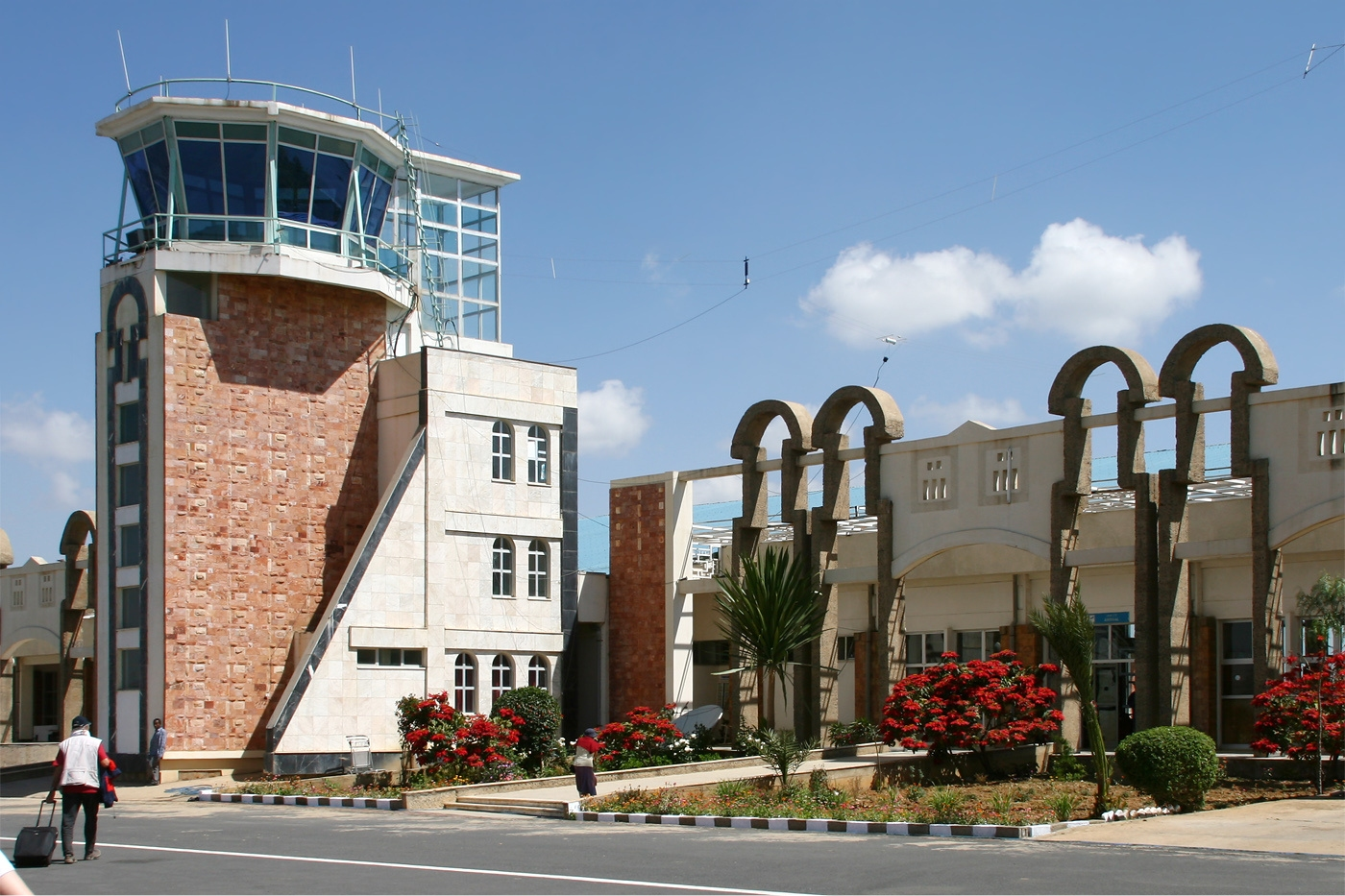
- IATA: AXU; ICAO: HAAX

Summary
- Airport type: Public
- Owner: Ethiopian Civil Aviation Authority
- Operator: Ethiopian Airports Enterprise
- Serves: Axum, Ethiopia
- Elevation AMSL: 2,108 m (6,916 ft)
- Coordinates: 14°08′13″N 038°46′34″E

Map
- Location within Ethiopia

Runways
Direction	Length		Surface
Direction	m	ft	Surface
16/34	2,400	7,874	Asphalt concrete

Axum Airport (Tigrinya: ኣኽሱም ዮሃንስ ራብዓይ መዕረፍ ነፈርቲ) (IATA: AXU, ICAO: HAAX), also known as Emperor Yohannes IV Airport, is a public airport serving Axum, a city in the northern Tigray Region of Ethiopia. The name of the city and airport may also be transliterated as Aksum. The facility is located 5.5 km (3.4 miles) to the east of the city.

The airport is named after Yohannes IV, the Emperor of Ethiopia from 1872 to 1889.

The airport was heavily damaged by Tigray People's Liberation Front forces during the Tigray war in November 2020.

== Facilities ==
Axum Airport lies at an elevation of 2,108 metres (6,916 ft) above mean sea level. It has one runway designated 16/34, with an asphalt concrete surface measuring 2,400 by 45 metres (7,874 ft × 148 ft). It is capable of receiving very large aircraft, such as the Antonov 124, which brought the Axum Obelisk back from Italy in 2005.

== Airlines and destinations ==
Airlines	Destinations
Ethiopian Airlines	Addis Ababa, Gondar, Lalibela, Mek'ele

== Incidents ==
On 2 May 1988, a Douglas C-47A ET-AGT of Ethiopian Airlines was destroyed on the ground in an attack on the airport by Ethiopian Air Force MiG-23s during the Ethiopian Civil War.
