= Chiang Klang Airport =

Former military airport

Chiang Klang Airport
- สนามบินเชียงกลาง
- Chiang Klang district, Nan province in Thailand

Site information
- Type: Military airstrip
- Operator: United States Air Force; Royal Thai Air Force
- Condition: Decommissioned, now managed by Wat Phra That Cho Hae

Location
- Shown within Thailand
- Coordinates: 19°17′40″N 100°51′26″E

Site history
- Built: 1957
- Built by: United States with Thai support
- In use: 1957 - August 1, 1976
- Battles/wars: Vietnam War
- Events: CIA operations in the Cold War

Airfield information
- Identifiers: ICAO: VTCD
Runways
Direction	Length and surface
01/19	Marston Matting

Chiang Klang Airport (ICAO: VTCD) is a former military airport located in Chiang Klang district, Thailand. It was constructed in 1957 to facilitate operations of the Central Intelligence Agency and the Vietnam War. It was closed on 1 August, 1976, following the withdrawal of US military installations.

== History ==
In 1957, Chiang Klang Airport was established to support transportation for operations of the Central Intelligence Agency (CIA) during the Cold War. Afterwards, it served as a small airstrip for military and transport. In 1962, the airport was expanded to accommodate larger aircraft with a longer gravel runway. In 1967, runway was reinforced with Marston Matting for operations of the United States Air Force and Royal Thai Air Force.

=== Vietnam War operations ===
During the Vietnam War, the airport supported flights and operations from Nakhon Phanom and Udorn. It was mainly used to aid in military operations along the border. In early February 1968, two Cessna O-1 Bird Dogs were deployed to Chiang Klang Airport, equipped with portable FAC UHF radios as a temporary expedient to communicate with RTAF fighter aircraft. Along with the aircraft, four additional Forward Air Controllers (FACs) were deployed to Chiang Klang Airport as part of the visual reconnaissance program and to control air strikes. Later, in an effort to provide coverage in northern Thailand, Direct Air Support Center 3, which support the Royal Thai 3rd Army, was moved from Chiang Klang to Lampomg and Nan. Soon afterwards, it was collocated with the 3rd Army Tactical Operations Center at Phitsunalok. Additionally, Chiang Klang Airport operated a low frequency beacon. From 1969 to 1970, Chiang Klang Airport was used by Air America’s de Havilland Canada DHC-4 Caribous to shuttle rice across the border to an airstrip designated as LS-69A, located in Ban Xieng Lom, Laos. On 13 January 1970, an RTAF Douglas C-47 Skytrain registered as serial L2-17/00 took off from the airport and crashed. There were 6 occupants and 1 fatality was recorded, and the aircraft was subsequently written off from operation.

== Closure ==
In March 1976, the Thai Government ordered to withdraw all US military installations and stations. After the withdrawal of US troops, Chiang Klang Airport ceased operations and was later given to Wat Phra That Cho Hae, a royal temple, to be managed by the local authorities. The ownership transfer was finalized on 1 August, 1976.
