= Gondar Airport =

Airport in Amhara Region, Ethiopia

Gondar Atse Tewodros Airport የጎንደር ዓፄ ቴዎድሮስ የአየር ማረፊያ
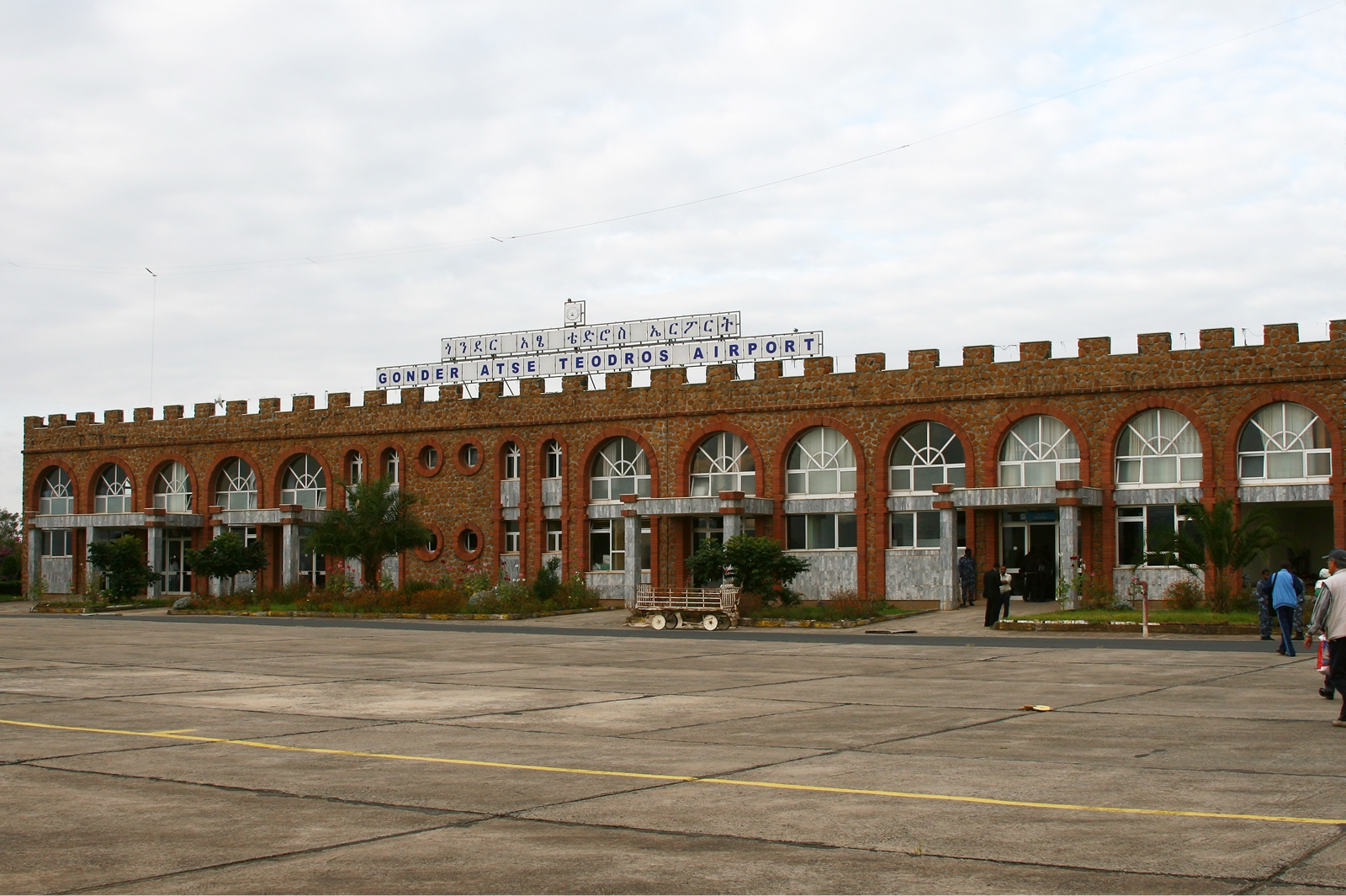
- IATA: GDQ; ICAO: HAGN

Summary
- Airport type: Public
- Operator: Ethiopian Airports Enterprise
- Serves: Gondar, Ethiopia
- Elevation AMSL: 1,994 m (6,542 ft)
- Coordinates: 12°31′11″N 037°26′02″E

Map
- Location within Ethiopia

Runways
Direction	Length		Surface
Direction	m	ft	Surface
17/35	2,700	8,858	Asphalt

Gondar Airport (IATA: GDQ, ICAO: HAGN), also known as Atse Tewodros Airport, is a public airport serving Gondar, a city in the northern Amhara Region of Ethiopia. The name of the city and airport may also be transliterated as Gonder. The airport is located 18 km (11 miles) south of Gondar. The airport is named after the 19th century Emperor of Ethiopia (Atse) Tewodros II.

== Facilities ==
Gondar airport is at an elevation of 1,994 metres (6,542 ft) above mean sea level. It has one runway designated 17/35, with an asphalt surface measuring 2,700 by 45 metres (8,858 ft × 148 ft).

== Airlines and destinations ==
Airlines	Destinations
Ethiopian Airlines	Addis Ababa, Axum, Lalibela
