= Lynne Cox =

American swimmer (born 1957)

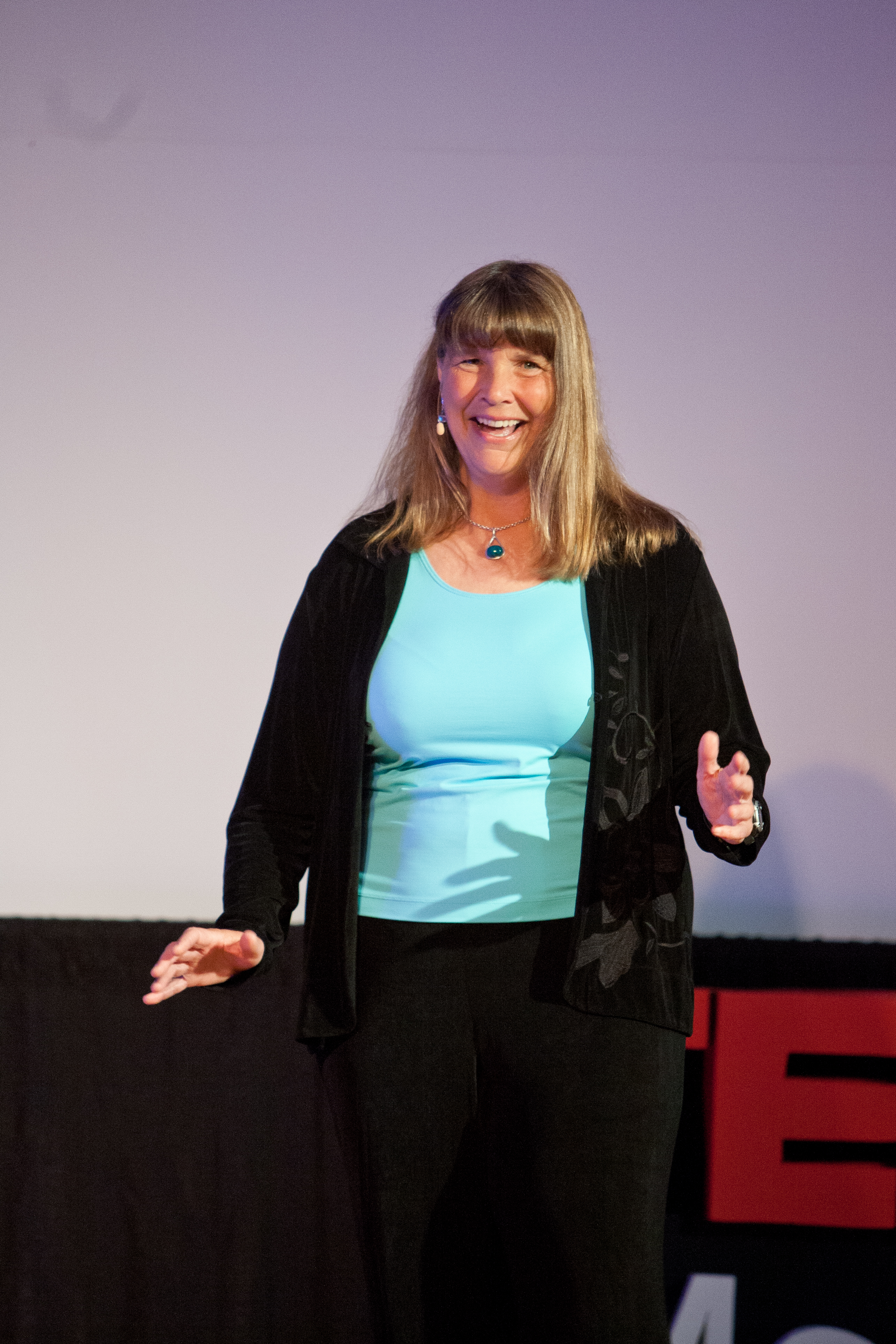
- Cox in 2012

Personal information
- Born: January 2, 1957 (age 69) Boston, Massachusetts, U.S.
- Website: www.lynnecox.com

Sport
- Sport: Swimming

Lynne Cox (born January 2, 1957) is an American long-distance open water swimmer, writer, and speaker. She is best known for being the first person to swim between the United States and the Soviet Union, across the Bering Strait, a feat which has been recognized for easing Cold War tensions between U.S. President Ronald Reagan and Soviet leader Mikhail Gorbachev.

External videos
- The Lynne Cox Story – Mysteries at the Museum

== Achievements ==
In 1971, she and her teammates were the first group of teenagers to complete the crossing of the Catalina Island Channel in California. She has twice held the record for the fastest crossing of the English Channel from England to France (1972 in a time of 9 hours 57 minutes and 1973 in a time of 9 hours 36 minutes). In 1975, Cox became the first woman to swim the 10 °C (50 °F), 16 km (9.9 mi) Cook Strait in New Zealand. In 1976, she was the first person to swim the Strait of Magellan in Chile, and the first to swim around the Cape of Good Hope in South Africa.

Cox is perhaps best known for swimming 2 hour 6 minutes in the Bering Strait on August 7, 1987, from Little Diomede in Alaska to Big Diomede, then part of the Soviet Union, where the water temperature averaged around 43 to 44 °F (6 to 7 °C). At the time people living on the Diomede Islands, only 3.7 km (2.3 mi) apart, were not permitted to travel between them, although the Inuit communities there had been closely linked until the natives of Big Diomede were moved to the Russian mainland after World War II. Her accomplishment a few years before the end of the Cold War earned praise from both U.S. President Ronald Reagan and Soviet leader Mikhail Gorbachev.

At the signing of the INF Missile Treaty at the White House, Gorbachev made a toast. He and President Reagan lifted their glasses and Gorbachev said: "Last summer it took one brave American by the name of Lynne Cox just two hours to swim from one of our countries to the other. We saw on television how sincere and friendly the meeting was between our people and the Americans when she stepped onto the Soviet shore. She proved by her courage how close to each other our peoples live".

In May 1992, Lynne Cox swam in the Andean Lake Titicaca, which, at 3,812 m (12,507 ft) elevation, is considered the world's highest navigable lake. While Titicaca's water, at 13 to 14 °C (55 to 57 °F), is warmer than that of the Bering Strait, the high elevation and unidentified biting creatures offered an unusual challenge. The swimmer covered the distance of around 10 miles from Copacabana, Bolivia, to the village of Chimbo, Peru, in 3 hours 48 minutes. The Bolivian Navy provided support boats.

Another of her accomplishments was swimming more than a mile (1.6 km) in the waters of Antarctica. Cox was in the 32 °F (0 °C) water for 25 min, swimming 1.22 miles (1.96 km). Her book about the experience, Swimming to Antarctica, was published in 2004.

Her second book, Grayson, details her encounter with a lost baby gray whale during an early morning workout off the coast of California. It was published in 2006.

In August 2006, joined by local swimmers, Lynne Cox swam across the Ohio River in Cincinnati from the Serpentine Wall to Newport, Kentucky, to bring attention to plans to decrease the water-quality standards for the Ohio River.

In 2011, she published South with the Sun, both a biography of Roald Amundsen and a chronicle of her 2007 swimming expedition to Greenland, Baffin Island and Alaska, tracing Amundsen's Northwest Passage expedition.

== Works ==
- —— (2004). Swimming to Antarctica. Alfred A. Knopf. ISBN 9780156031301.
- —— (2006). Grayson. Alfred A. Knopf. ISBN 9780307264541.
- —— (2011). South with the Sun. Alfred A. Knopf. ISBN 9780307593405.
- —— (2013). Open Water Swimming Manual: An Expert's Survival Guide for Triathletes and Open Water Swimmers. Knopf Doubleday Publishing Group. ISBN 9780345806093.
- —— (2014). Elizabeth, Queen of the Seas. Schwartz & Wade. ISBN 9780375858888.
- —— (2016). Swimming in the Sink: An Episode of the Heart. Alfred A. Knopf. ISBN 9781101947623.
- —— (2022). Tales of Al: The Water Rescue Dog. Alfred A. Knopf. ISBN 9780593319376.

== Awards and honors ==
- 2005 Alex Award
- 2014 California Book Awards Juvenile Finalist for "Elizabeth, Queen of the Seas"
- 2015 Irma Black Award Honor
- The asteroid 37588 Lynnecox was named in her honor.

== See also ==
- List of members of the International Swimming Hall of Fame
