= Bering Strait =

Strait between Asia and North America

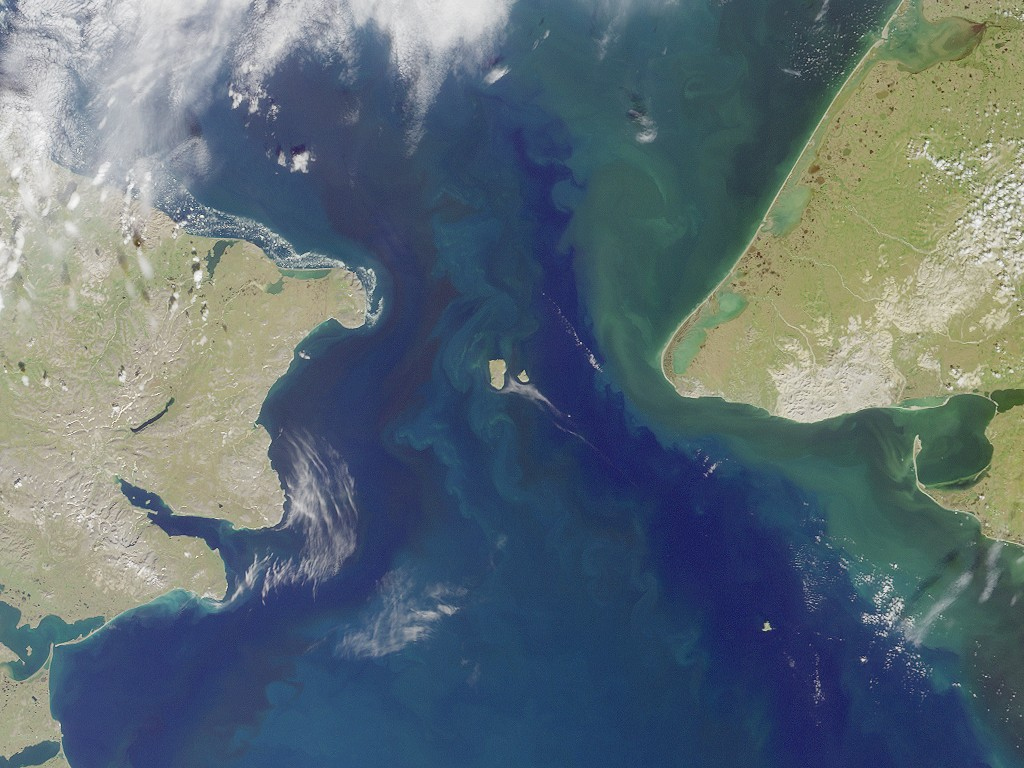
- Satellite image of the Bering Strait. Cape Dezhnev, Russia, is on the left, the two Diomede Islands are in the middle, and Cape Prince of Wales, Alaska, is on the right

- Location within Alaska

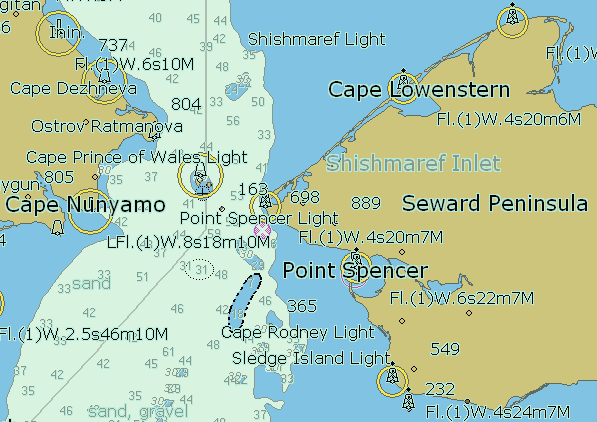
- Nautical chart of the Bering Strait
- Location: North Asia and Northern America
- Coordinates: 65°45′00″N 168°58′37″W
- Basin countries: Russia, United States
- Min. width: 82 km (51 mi)
- Average depth: 30–50 m (98–164 ft)
- Max. depth: 90 m (300 ft)
- Islands: Diomede Islands

The Bering Strait (/ˈbɛərɪŋ, ˈbɛrɪŋ/ BAIR-ing, BERR-ing, US also /ˈbɪərɪŋ/ BEER-ing) is a strait between the Pacific and Arctic oceans, separating the Chukchi Peninsula of Siberia in the Russian Far East from the Seward Peninsula of Alaska in North America. The present Russia–United States maritime boundary is at 168° 58' 37" W longitude, slightly south of the Arctic Circle at about 65° 40' N latitude. The Strait is named after Vitus Bering, a Danish-born Russian explorer.

The Bering Strait has been the subject of the scientific theory that humans migrated from Asia to North America across a land bridge known as Beringia when lower ocean levels – a result of glaciers locking up vast amounts of water – exposed a wide stretch of the sea floor, both at the present strait and in the shallow sea north and south of it. This view of how Paleo-Indians entered America has been the dominant one for several decades and continues to be the most accepted one. Numerous successful crossings without the use of a boat have also been recorded since at least the early 20th century.

== Geography and science ==
The Bering Strait is about 82 kilometers (51 mi) wide at its narrowest point, between Cape Dezhnev, Chukchi Peninsula, Russia, the easternmost point (169° 39' W) of the Asian continent and Cape Prince of Wales, Alaska, United States, the westernmost point (168° 05' W) of the North American continent. Its deepest point is only 90 metres (300 ft). It borders the Chukchi Sea (part of the Arctic Ocean) to the north and the Bering Sea to the south. The strait is a unique habitat sparsely populated by the Yupik, Inuit, and Chukchi people who have cultural and linguistic ties to each other.

The strait is thought to have opened 4.8-7.4 million years ago. It is believed that the narrowing of the strait 900,000 years ago could be one of the reasons for increasing the duration of the ice age.

== Expeditions ==
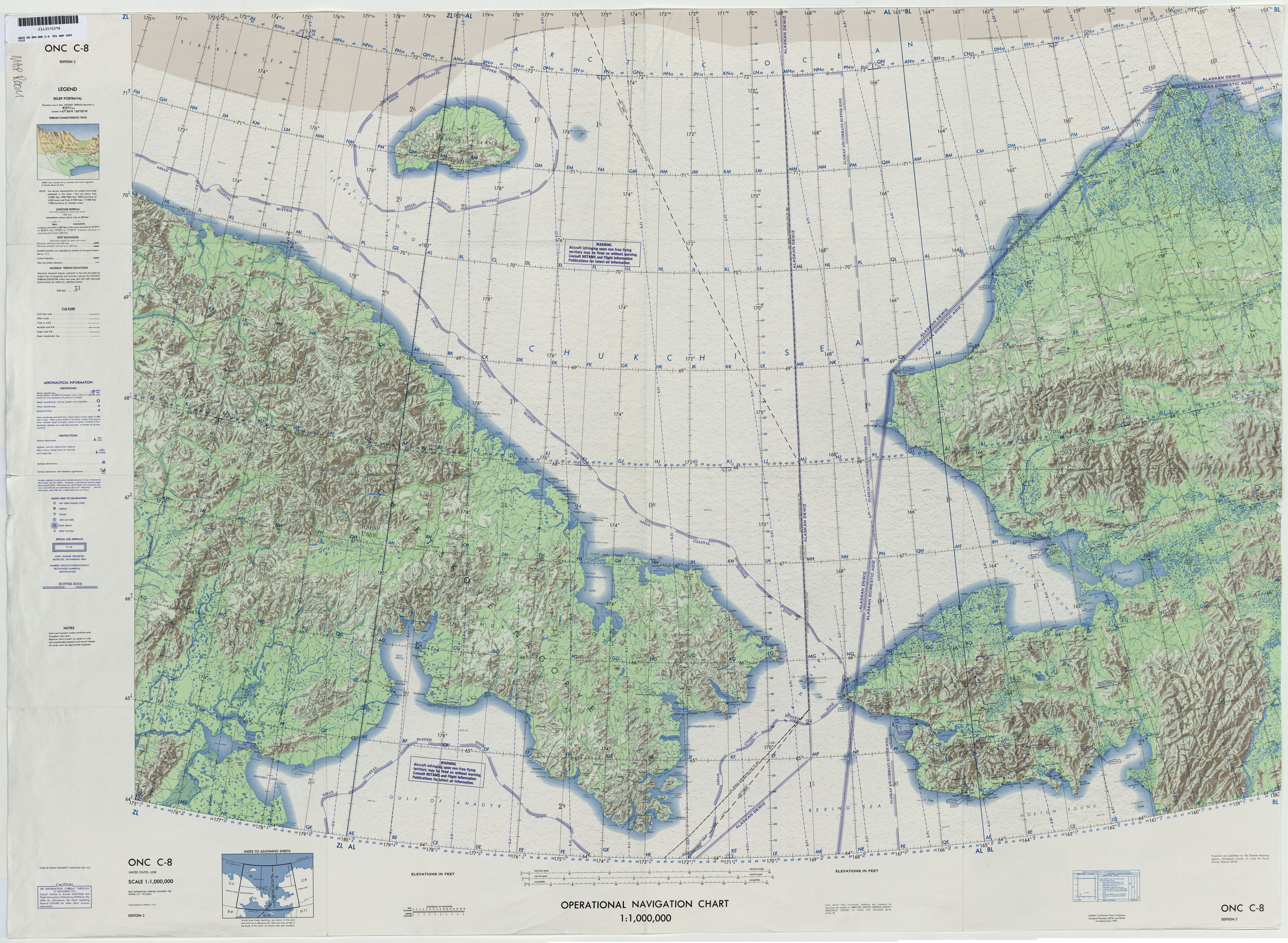
Defense Mapping Agency topographical map of the Bering Strait, 1973

From at least 1562, European geographers thought that there was a Strait of Anián between Asia and North America. In 1648, Semyon Dezhnyov probably passed through the strait, but his report did not reach Europe. Danish-born Russian navigator Vitus Bering entered it in 1728. In 1732, Mikhail Gvozdev became the first European to cross it, from Asia to America. It was visited in 1778 by the third voyage of James Cook.

American vessels were hunting for bowhead whales in the strait by 1847.

In March 1913, Captain Max Gottschalk (German) crossed from the east cape of Siberia to Shishmaref, Alaska, on dogsled via Little and Big Diomede islands. He was the first documented modern voyager to cross from Russia to North America without the use of a boat.

In 1987, swimmer Lynne Cox swam a 4.3-kilometer (2.7 mi) course between the Diomede Islands from Alaska to the Soviet Union in 3.3 °C (37.9 °F) water during the last years of the Cold War. She was congratulated jointly by American president Ronald Reagan and Soviet leader Mikhail Gorbachev.

In June and July 1989, three independent teams attempted the first modern sea-kayak crossing of the Bering Strait. The groups were: seven Alaskans, who called their effort Paddling Into Tomorrow (i.e. crossing the international dateline); a four-man British expedition, Kayaks Across the Bering Strait; and a team of Californians in a three-person baidarka, led by Jim Noyes (who launched his ambitious expedition as a paraplegic). Accompanying the Californians was a film crew in a umiak, a walrus-skin boat traditional to the region; they were filming the 1991 documentary Curtain of Ice, directed by John Armstrong.

In March 2006, Briton Karl Bushby and French-American adventurer Dimitri Kieffer crossed the strait on foot, walking across a frozen 90-kilometer (56 mi) section in 15 days. They were soon arrested for not entering Russia through a regular port of entry.

August 2008 marked the first crossing of the Bering Strait using an amphibious road-going vehicle. The specially modified Land Rover Defender 110 was driven by Steve Burgess and Dan Evans across the straits on its second attempt following the interruption of the first by bad weather.

In February 2012, a Korean team led by Hong Sung-Taek crossed the straits on foot in six days. They started from Chukotka Peninsula, the east coast of Russia on February 23 and arrived in Wales, the western coastal town in Alaska on February 29.

In July 2012, six adventurers associated with "Dangerous Waters", a reality adventure show under production, made the crossing on Sea-Doos but were arrested and permitted to return to Alaska on their Sea-Doos after being briefly detained in Lavrentiya, the administrative center of the Chukotsky District. They were treated well and given a tour of the village's museum, but not permitted to continue south along the Pacific coast. The men had visas but the western coast of the Bering Strait is a closed military zone.

Between August 4 and 10 (US time), 2013, a team of 65 swimmers from 17 countries performed a relay swim across the Bering Strait, the first such swim in history. They swam from Cape Dezhnev, Russia, to Cape Prince of Wales, United States (roughly 110 kilometers (68 mi), due to the current). They had direct support from the Russian Navy, using one of its ships, and assistance with permission.

== Proposed crossings ==
A physical link between Asia and North America via the Bering Strait nearly became a reality in 1864 when a Russian-American telegraph company began preparations for an overland telegraph line connecting Europe and America via the east. It was abandoned when the undersea Atlantic Cable proved successful.

A further proposal for a bridge-and-tunnel link from eastern Russia to Alaska was made by French engineer Baron Loicq de Lobel in 1906. Czar Nicholas II of Russia issued an order authorising a Franco-American syndicate represented by de Lobel to begin work on the Trans-Siberian Alaska railroad project, but no physical work ever commenced.

Suggestions have been made to construct a Bering Strait bridge between Alaska and Siberia. Despite the unprecedented engineering, political, and financial challenges, Russia green-lit a US$65-billion TKM-World Link tunnel project in August 2011. If completed, the 103-kilometer (64 mi) tunnel would be the world's longest. China considered construction of a "China-Russia-Canada-America" railroad line that would include construction of a 200-kilometer-long (120 mi) underwater tunnel that would cross the Bering Strait.

== Proposed geological engineering ==
In 1956, the Soviet Union proposed to the US a joint bi-national project to warm the Arctic Ocean and melt some of the ice cap. As designed by Petr Borisov, the Soviet project called for a 90-kilometer-wide (56 mi) dam across the Bering Strait. It would block the cold Pacific current from entering the Arctic. By pumping low-salinity cold surface water across the dam to the Pacific, warmer and higher salinity sea water from the Atlantic Ocean would be introduced into the Arctic Ocean. However, citing national security concerns, the CIA and FBI experts opposed the Soviet plan by arguing that while the plan was feasible, it would compromise NORAD and thus the dam could be built at only an immense cost. Soviet scientist D. A. Drogaytsev also opposed the idea, stating that the sea north of the dam and north-flowing rivers in Siberia would become unnavigable year round, and the Gobi and other deserts would be extended to the northern Siberia coastline.

American Charles P. Steinmetz (1865–1923) earlier proposed to widen the Bering Strait by removing St. Lawrence Island and parts of Seward and Chukotski Peninsulas. A strait 320 kilometers (200 mi) wide would let the Japan Current melt the Arctic Ocean.

In the 21st century, a 300-kilometer (190 mi) dam has also been proposed. However, the aim of the proposal is to preserve the Arctic ice cap against global warming.

== "Ice Curtain" border ==
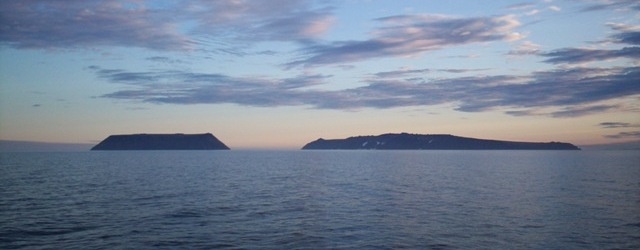
Little Diomede Island (US, left) and Big Diomede Island (Russia, right)

During the Cold War, the Bering Strait marked the border between the Soviet Union and the United States. The Diomede Islands—Big Diomede (Russia) and Little Diomede (US)—are only 3.8 km (2.4 mi) apart. Traditionally, the indigenous people in the area had frequently crossed the border back and forth for "routine visits, seasonal festivals and subsistence trade", but were prevented from doing so during the Cold War. The border became known as the "Ice Curtain". It was completely closed, and there was no regular passenger air or boat traffic.

Since 2012, the Russian coast of the Bering Strait has been a closed military zone. Through organized trips and the use of special permits, it is possible for foreigners to visit. All arrivals must be through an airport or a cruise port, near the Bering Strait only at Anadyr or Provideniya. Unauthorized travelers who arrive on shore after crossing the strait, even those with visas, may be arrested, imprisoned briefly, fined, deported and banned from future visas.

== See also ==
- List of Russian explorers
- Old Bering Sea
