= Diomedes of Tarsus =

Greek saint and martyr

Saint Diomedes
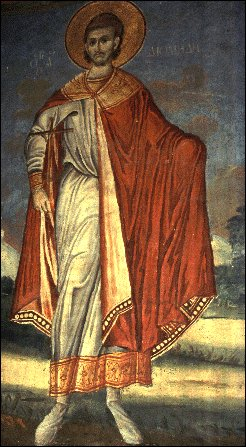
- Fresco of St. Diomedes at Hilandar Monastery, Mt. Athos.

Martyr
- Born: Tarsus (modern-day Tarsus, Mersin, Turkey)
- Died: between 298 and 311 AD; Nicaea (modern-day İznik, Turkey)
- Venerated in: Roman Catholic Church; Eastern Orthodox Church
- Feast: 16 August

Saint Diomedes of Tarsus (Ancient Greek: Διομήδης ὁ Ταρσεύς, romanized: Diomḗdēs ho Tarseús; also known as Diomede; died between 298 and 311 AD) is venerated as a Greek Christian saint and martyr, being one of the Holy Unmercenaries.

== Life ==
Diomedes was born in Tarsus. He was a physician by profession and a zealous Christian evangelist. He traveled a good deal preaching the faith. When he arrived at Nicaea, Diocletian ordered him arrested. On route to Nicomedia, Diomedes paused to pray and then died. The soldiers took his head as proof he had been arrested. One source states, "It is said that when his head was taken to the emperor, that all were blinded, and only after his body has been returned and they had prayed, was their sight restored."

== Named after him ==
His feast day is 16 August (O.S.). There is a fresco of him at the monastery of Hilandar on Mount Athos, Greece.

The Diomede Islands off the coast of Alaska derive their name from this saint. Vitus Bering sighted the Diomede Islands on 16 August (O.S., 27 August N.S.) 1728, the day when the Russian Orthodox Church celebrates the memory of Saint Diomedes during the Nut Feast of the Saviour.

== Saint Diomedes (II) ==
There is another Saint Diomedes who is celebrated on 2 September. With Julian, Philip, Theodore, Eutychian (Eutykhian), Hesychius (Heyschios), Leonides, Philadelphus (Philadelphos), Menalippus (Melanippos), and Pantagapes (Parthagapa) he was martyred at an unknown date and site. They suffered various forms of execution (burning at the stake, drowning, beheading, or crucifixion).
