= Naukan =

Naukan can refer to:

- Naukan people, ethnic group in Northeastern Siberia
- Naukan Yupik language, their language
- Naukan (village), settlement in far eastern Russia
- Naukan, Iran (disambiguation), several settlements in Iran
- Naukan (crater), crater on Mars

== See also ==
- Naukane, Hawaiian chief
