= Yupik peoples =

Indigenous peoples of Alaska and the Russian Far East

Yupik
Total population
- ~35,567

Regions with significant populations
- United States Alaska: 33,889; 22,000
- Russia Chukotka: ~1,700

Languages
- English (Alaska) • Russian (in Siberia) • Yupik languages

Religion
- Christianity (mostly Eastern Orthodox and Moravian), Shamanism, Atheism

Related ethnic groups
- Aleut, Chukchi, Inuit, Iñupiat, Sirenik

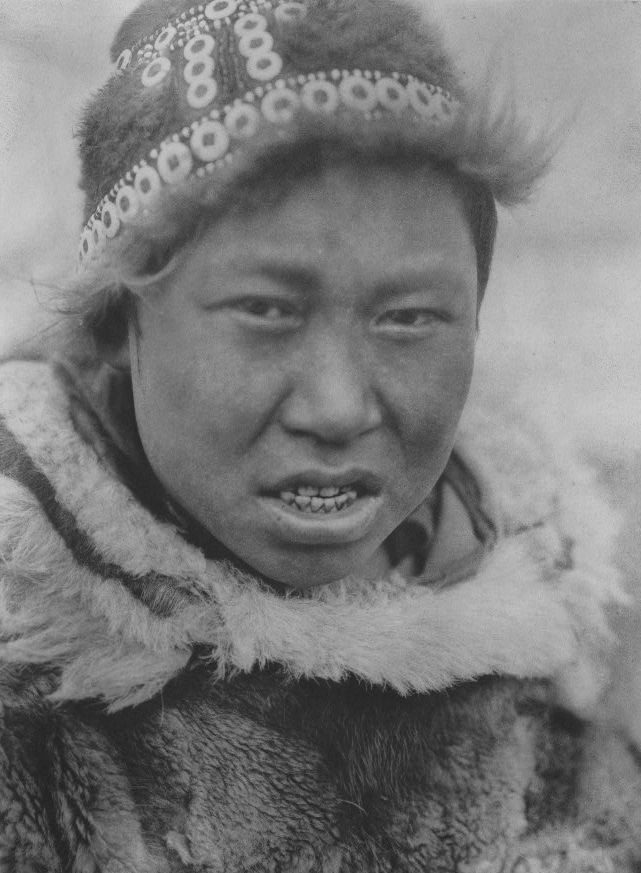
Central Alaskan Hooper Bay youth, 1930

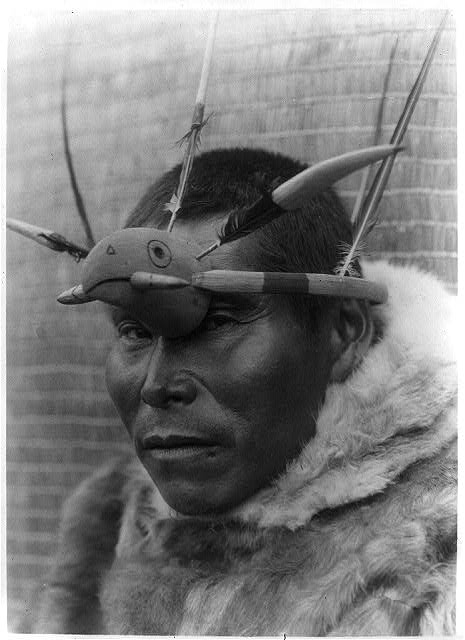
A Nunivak Cupʼig man with raven maskette in 1929; the raven (Cupʼig language: tulukarug) is Ellam Cua or the creator deity in the Cupʼig mythology

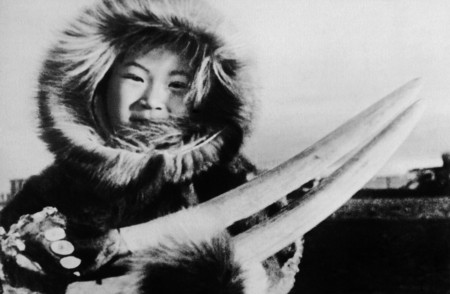
A Siberian Yupik woman holding walrus tusks, Russia

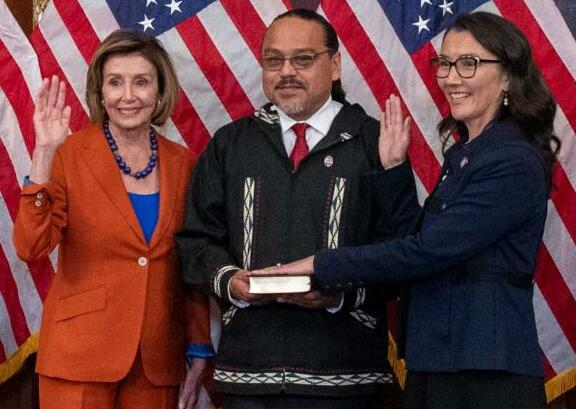
House Speaker Nancy Pelosi (left) swears in Mary Peltola as her husband, Gene (center), looks on. Peltola is a Yupʼik from Western Alaska.

The Yupik (/ˈjuːpɪk/; Russian: Юпикские народы) are a group of Indigenous or Aboriginal peoples of western, southwestern, and southcentral Alaska and the Russian Far East. They are closely related to the Inuit and Iñupiat. Yupik peoples include the following:

- Alutiiq, or Sugpiaq, of the Alaska Peninsula and coastal and island areas of southcentral Alaska.
- Yupʼik or Central Alaskan Yupʼik of the Yukon–Kuskokwim Delta, the Kuskokwim River, and along the northern coast of Bristol Bay as far east as Nushagak Bay and the northern Alaska Peninsula at Naknek River and Egegik Bay in Alaska.
- Siberian Yupik, including Naukan, Chaplino, and—in a linguistic capacity—the Sirenik of the Russian Far East and St. Lawrence Island in western Alaska.

== Population ==
The Yupʼik people are by far the most numerous of the various Alaska Native groups. They speak the Central Alaskan Yupʼik language, a member of the Eskaleut family of languages.

As of the 2002 United States Census, the Yupik population in the United States numbered more than 24,000, of whom more than 22,000 lived in Alaska; the vast majority live in the 70 or so communities in the traditional Yupʼik territory of western and southwestern Alaska. United States census data for Yupik include 2,355 Sugpiat; there are also 1,700 Yupik living in Russia. According to 2019-based United States Census Bureau data, there are 700 Alaskan Natives in Seattle, many of whom are Inuit and Yupik; there are also almost 7,000 Yupik in the state of Washington.

== Etymology of name ==
Yupʼik (plural Yupiit) comes from the Yupik word yuk meaning "person" plus the post-base -pik meaning "real" or "genuine". Thus, it literally means "real people". The ethnographic literature sometimes refers to the Yupʼik people or their language as Yuk or Yuit. In the Hooper Bay–Chevak and Nunivak dialects of Yupʼik, both the language and the people are known as Cupʼik.

The use of an apostrophe in the name "Yupʼik", compared to Siberian "Yupik", exemplifies the Central Alaskan Yupʼik's orthography, where the apostrophe represents gemination [or lengthening] of the 'p' sound.

The "person/people" (human being) in the Yupik and Inuit languages:

| Eskaleut languages | | singular | dual | plural |
| Yupik languages | Sirenik language | йух | (none) | йугый |
| Yupik languages | Central Siberian Yupik language | yuk | ? | yuit |
| Yupik languages | Naukan Yupik language | yuk | ? | yuget |
| Yupik languages | Central Alaskan Yupʼik language | yuk | yuuk | yuut (< yuuget) |
| Yupik languages | Chevak Cupꞌik dialect | cuk | cuugek | cuuget |
| Yupik languages | Nunivak Cupʼig language | cug | cuug | cuuget |
| Yupik languages | Alutiiq language (Sugpiaq language) | suk | suuk | suuget |
| Inuit languages | Iñupiaq language (Alaskan Inuit language) | iñuk | iññuk | iñuit / iñuich |
| Inuit languages | Inuvialuktun (Western Canadian Inuktun) | inuk | innuk | inuit |
| Inuit languages | Inuktitut (Eastern Canadian Inuktun) | inuk (ᐃᓄᒃ) | inuuk (ᐃᓅᒃ) | inuit (ᐃᓄᐃᑦ) |
| Inuit languages | Greenlandic language (Kalaallisut or West Greenlandic) | inuk | (none) | inuit |

== Origins ==
The common ancestors of the Indigenous peoples of Siberia and Aleut (as well as various Paleo-Siberian groups) are believed by anthropologists to have their origin in eastern Siberia, arriving in the Bering Sea area approximately 10,000 years ago. Research on blood types, supported by later linguistic and DNA findings, suggests that the ancestors of other indigenous peoples of the Americas reached North America before the ancestors of the Indigenous and Aleut. There appear to have been several waves of migration from Siberia to the Americas by way of the Bering land bridge, which became exposed between 20,000 and 8,000 years ago during periods of glaciation. By about 3,000 years ago, the progenitors of the Yupiit had settled along the coastal areas of what would become western Alaska, with migrations up the coastal rivers—notably the Yukon and Kuskokwim—around 1400 AD, eventually reaching as far upriver as Paimiut on the Yukon and Crow Village on the Kuskokwim.

The Siberian Yupik may represent a back-migration of the Indigenous people to Siberia from Alaska.

== Culture ==
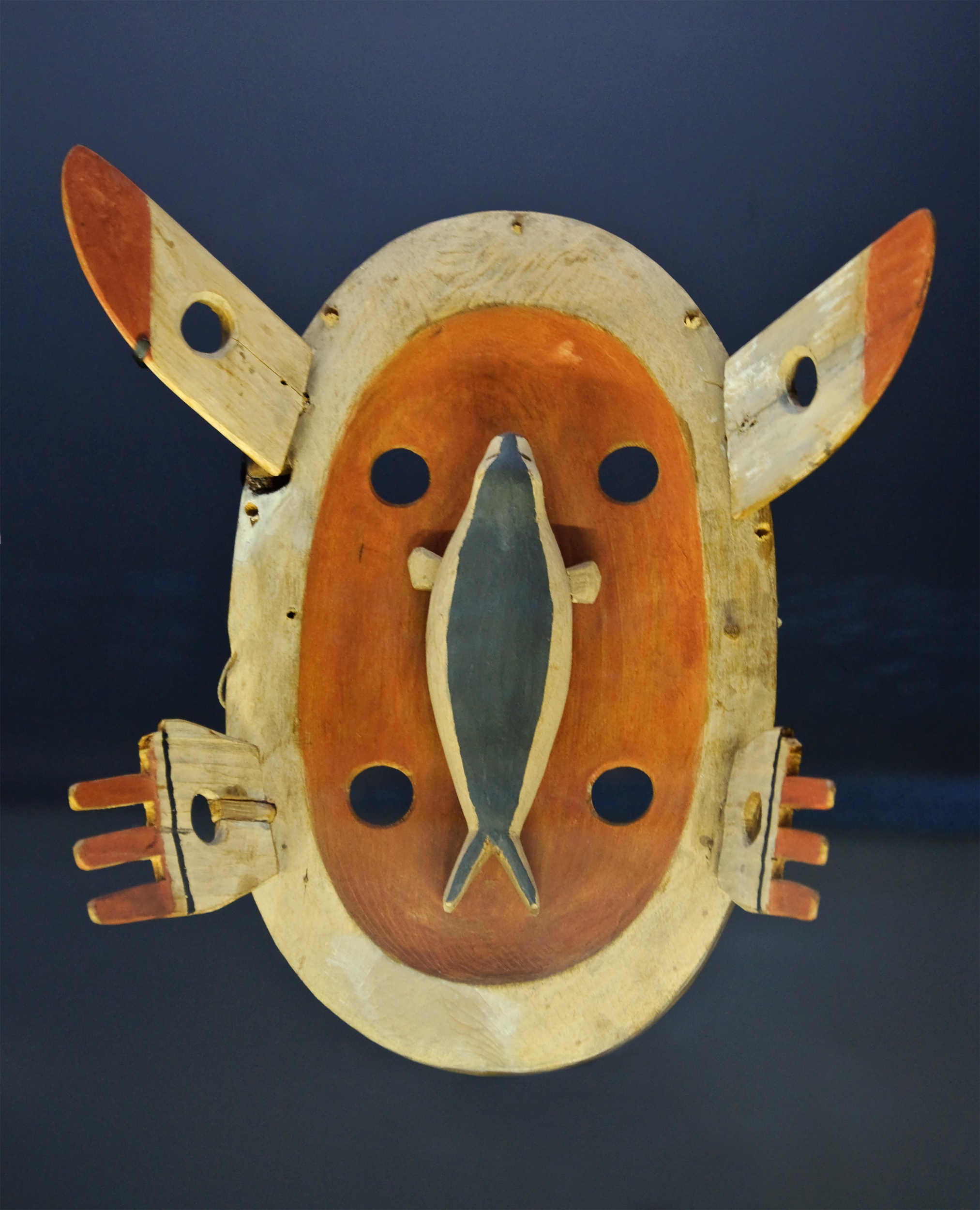
Yupʼik mask, Sitka, Alaska, collection of the Alaska State Museum

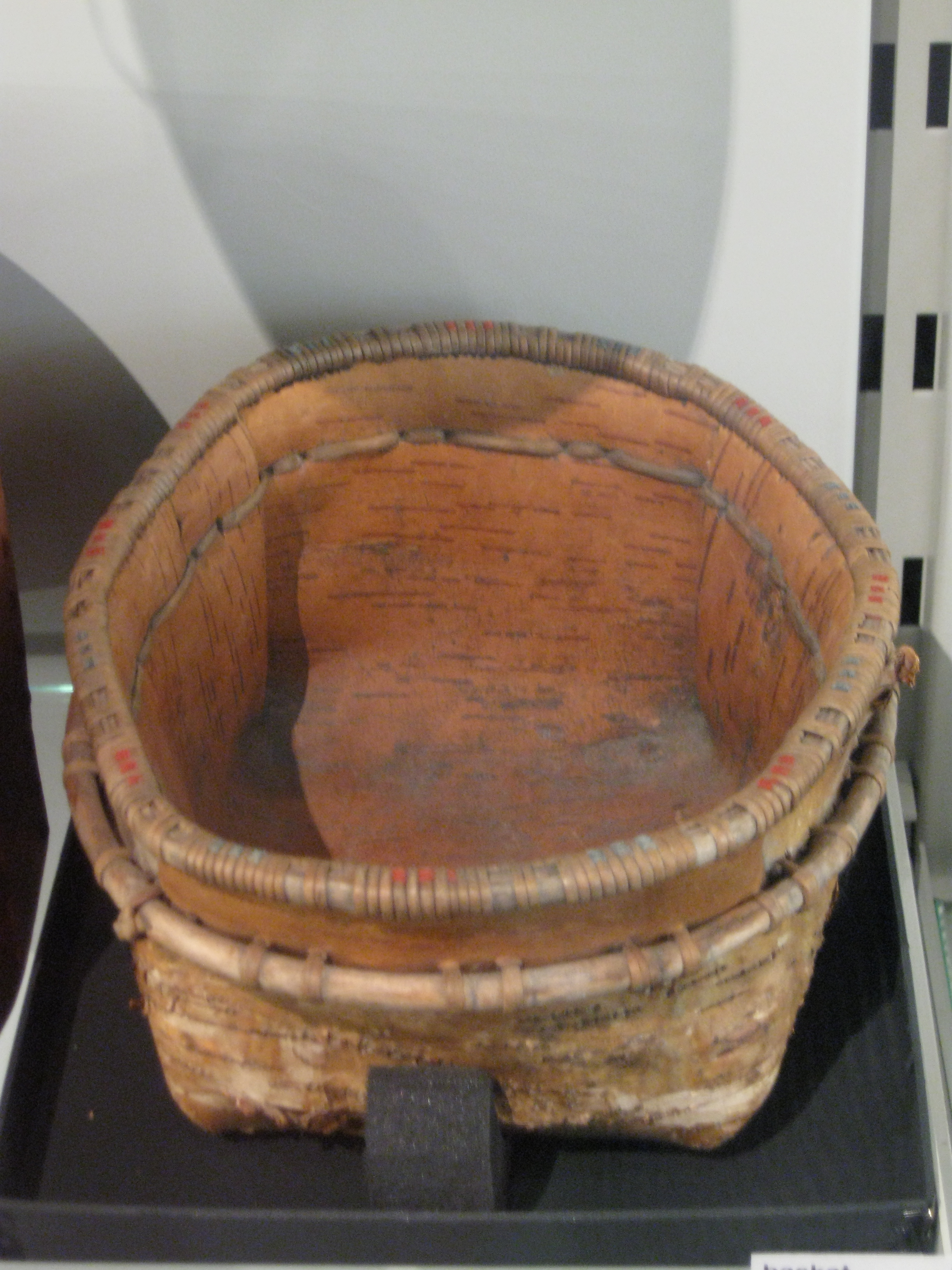
Yupʼik basket

Traditionally, families spent the spring and summer at fish camp, then joined others at village sites for the winter. Many families still harvest the traditional subsistence resources, especially Pacific salmon and seal.

The men's communal house, the qasgiq, was the community center for ceremonies and festivals that included singing, dancing, and storytelling. The qasgiq was used mainly during the winter months because people would travel in family groups following food sources throughout the spring, summer, and fall months. Aside from ceremonies and festivals, the qasgiq was also where the men taught the young boys survival and hunting skills, as well as other life lessons. The young boys were also taught how to make tools and qayaq (kayaks) during the winter months in the qasgiq. The ceremonies involve a shaman.

The women's house, the ena, was traditionally right next door. In some areas, the two communal houses were connected by a tunnel. Women taught the young girls how to tan hides and sew, process and cook game and fish, and weave. Boys would live with their mothers until they were approximately five years old, then they would join the men in the qasgiq.

For a period varying between three and six weeks, the boys and girls would switch cultural educational situations, with the men teaching the girls survival, hunting skills, and toolmaking, and the women teaching the boys the skills they taught to the girls.

In Yupʼik group dances, individuals often remain stationary while moving their upper body and arms rhythmically, their gestures accentuated by handheld dance fans, very similar in design to Cherokee dance fans. The limited motion by no means limits the expressiveness of the dances, which can be gracefully flowing, bursting with energy, or wryly humorous.

The Yupʼik are unique among native peoples of the Americas in that they name children after the most recent person in the community to have died.

The kuspuk (qaspeq) is a traditional Yupʼik garment worn by both genders. In Alaska, it is worn in both casual and formal settings.

The seal-oil lamp (naniq) was an important piece of furniture.

== Languages ==
Five Yupik languages (related to Inuktitut) are still very widely spoken; Yupʼik is the most spoken Native language in Alaska by both population and speakers. This makes Yupʼik the second most spoken indigenous language in the US, after Navajo.

Like the Alaskan Iñupiat, the Alaskan and Siberian Yupik adopted the system of writing developed by Moravian Church missionaries during the 1760s in Greenland. Late 19th-century Moravian missionaries to the Yupik in southwestern Alaska used Yupik in church services and translated the scriptures into the people's language.

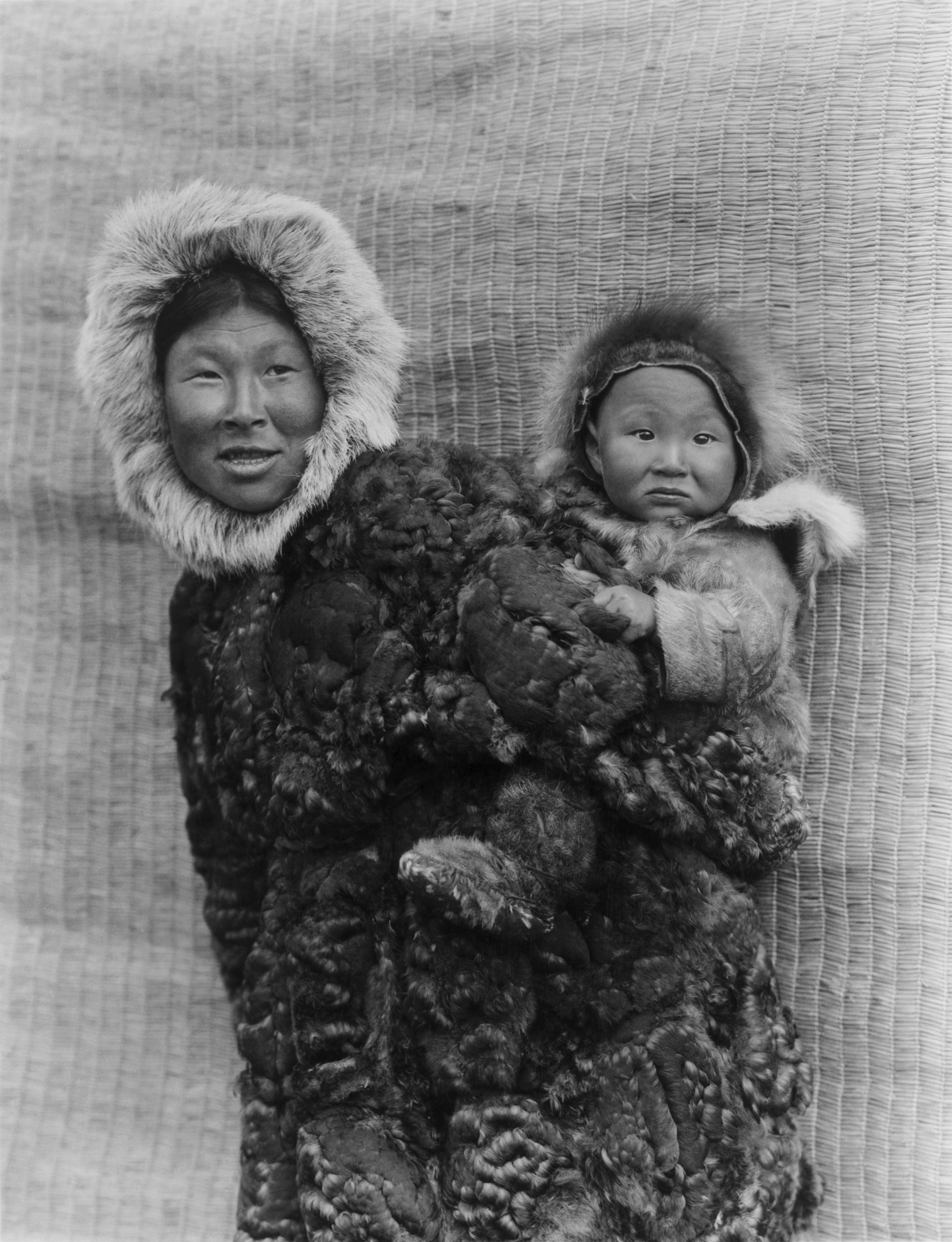
Nunivak Cupʼig mother and child, photograph by Edward Curtis, 1930

Russian explorers in the 1800s erroneously identified the Yupik people bordering the territory of the somewhat unrelated Aleut as also Aleut, or Alutiiq, in Yupik. By tradition, this term has remained in use, as well as Sugpiaq, both of which refer to the Yupik of Southcentral Alaska and Kodiak.

The whole Eskaleut languages family is shown below:

- Eskaleut languages
  - Aleut language
  - Eskimo languages
    - Inuit languages
    - Yupik languages
      - Alaskan
        - Central Alaskan Yupʼik language (Central Yupik language), ISO 639:esu
        - Alutiiq language (Pacific Gulf Yupik language), ISO 639:ems
      - Siberian
        - Central Siberian Yupik language (Yuit), ISO 639:ess
        - Naukan Yupik language, ISO 639:ynk
        - Sirenik language, ISO 639:ysr

== Notable people ==
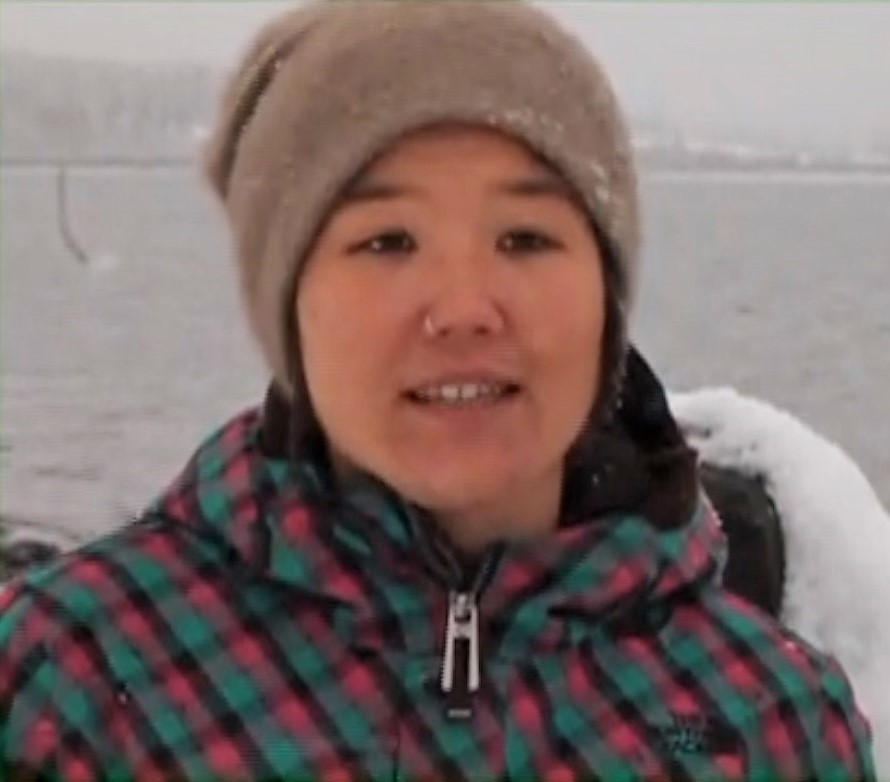
Callan Chythlook-Sifsof

- Mary Peltola (born 1973), U.S. Senator-elect from Alaska, former U.S. representative of Alaska's at-large congressional district, serving from September 2022 to January 2025; she was formerly a judge on the Orutsararmiut Native Council tribal court as well as executive director of the Kuskokwim River Inter-Tribal Fish Commission, Bethel city councilor, and member of the Alaska House of Representatives
- Rita Pitka Blumenstein (1936–2021), first certified traditional doctor in Alaska
- Callan Chythlook-Sifsof (born 1989), Olympic snowboarder
- Moses Paukan (1933–2017), businessman and politician
- Saint Olga Michael (1916–1979), Eastern Orthodox priest's wife (matushka) who was canonized as a saint in 2023 by the Orthodox Church in America
- Crow Village Sam (1893–1974), Alaskan Native leader
- Elizaveta Dobrieva (born 1942), researcher, teacher, and expert in Naukan

== See also ==
- List of Alaska Native tribal entities
- List of Notable Central Alaskan Yupʼik people
