= Elizaveta Dobrieva =

Naukan researcher and teacher (born 1942)

- Елизавета Добриева
- Born: Liza; 6 July 1942 (age 84); Naukan, Chukotsky District, Far Eastern Krai, Russian SFSR, Soviet Union
- Occupations: Researcher; Teacher
- Known for: Expert in Naukan Yupik language

Elizaveta Alikhanovna Dobrieva (born Liza, Russian: Елизавета Алихановна Добриева; born 6 July 1942) is a Naukan researcher and a former teacher. She is known as an expert in the Naukan language and culture. She is known in Chukotsky District as a living encyclopedia due to her wide knowledge in Naukan.

== Early life and education ==
Liza was born in a yaranga in Naukan on 6 July 1942 to Yakyn (died in 1994) and Zinaida Ivanovna Atuk (died in 1972). Her biological father was a store manager who later was jailed for shortages, causing her mother to remarry, this time to Alikhan Magometovich Dobriev (1920-1967). Liza did not see her biological father Yakyn until she turned 25. She also did not realize that Alikhan was her stepfather until she grew up. Nevertheless, Liza's stepfather's family always welcomed her. In 1946, she adopted the surname Dobriev. She was raised by her grandfather, Sinanik, and grandmother, Kyksukh, in a yaranga.

In 1949, she moved to Lavrentiya after Kyksukh's death and studied at the village's preparatory school. During the summer school holiday, she always returned to Naukan and stayed there for three months. Furthermore, she also recalled that her family experienced hunger in Lavrentiya.

Dobrieva completed her eight-year school and pursued higher education at Anadyr Pedagogical College of the Peoples of the North. She completed the study in 1963 with a score of 5 in all exam subjects except the labor report. As a result, she did not earn a red diploma, despite the college giving her a chance to retake the labor report exam, which she refused to do. Upon graduating from Pedagogical College, she received an offer to study at Herzen University by taking only one selection exam. However, she declined Herzen's offer since her parents could not afford the university tuition fee.

== Career ==
Upon finishing tertiary education, she worked as a Russian and Yupik language primary school teacher in Enurmino, Nunyamo, and Ust-Belaya. In 1969, she moved to Lavrentiya and worked there as a teacher. She retired as a teacher in 1992. Although she officially has retired as a teacher, her teaching career still continues. In 2023, she taught the Naukan language at the District House of Folk Art in Anadyr on 25 September.

Apart from being a teacher, Dobrieva also worked as a researcher of the Naukan people. She has been working as a research associate at the Chukotka District Museum of Local Lore in Lavrentiya since 1969. After she retired as a teacher, she became the head of a local history club at the House of Folk Art. As a researcher, she collects the Naukan people's language, history, and cultural material. She also assisted a scientist who researched the Naukan culture. She had been to Fairbanks twice in 1995 and 1999 for Naukan Yupik Eskimo dictionary project. Currently, she has been involved in the language project Master of the Land by becoming its consultant since 2022. Furthermore, she also joined folk song group, White Sail. Through White Sail, she has performed in Alaska, Canada, and Greenland.

Dobrieva also participated in the film and documentary. She helped in Alexey Vakhrushev's film titled Birds of Naukan in 1995. In 2018, she served as a narrator for a documentary titled Book of the Sea.

== Personal life ==
Dobrieva is married to Pavel Tegren and has three daughters. She has a Naukan name, which is Kylʹakak. After marriage, her stepfather asked Dobrieva to retain her surname. She also has relatives in Alaska.

== Work ==
- Naukan Yupik Eskimo Dictionary (2004)

== Awards ==
- Laureate of the Prize of the Chukotka Autonomous Okrug (2012)
- Honorary Resident of the Chukotka District (2016)
