= Trail blazing =

Practice of marking footpaths by leaving signs that indicate the route

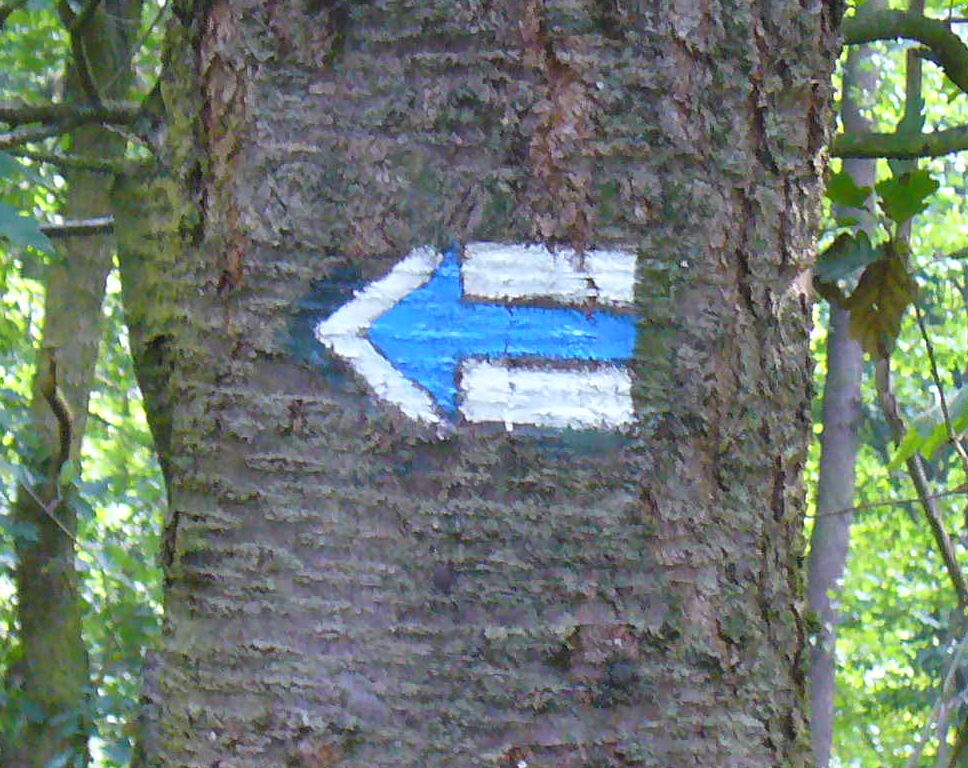
Left turn marker on a blue marked trail in the Czech Republic

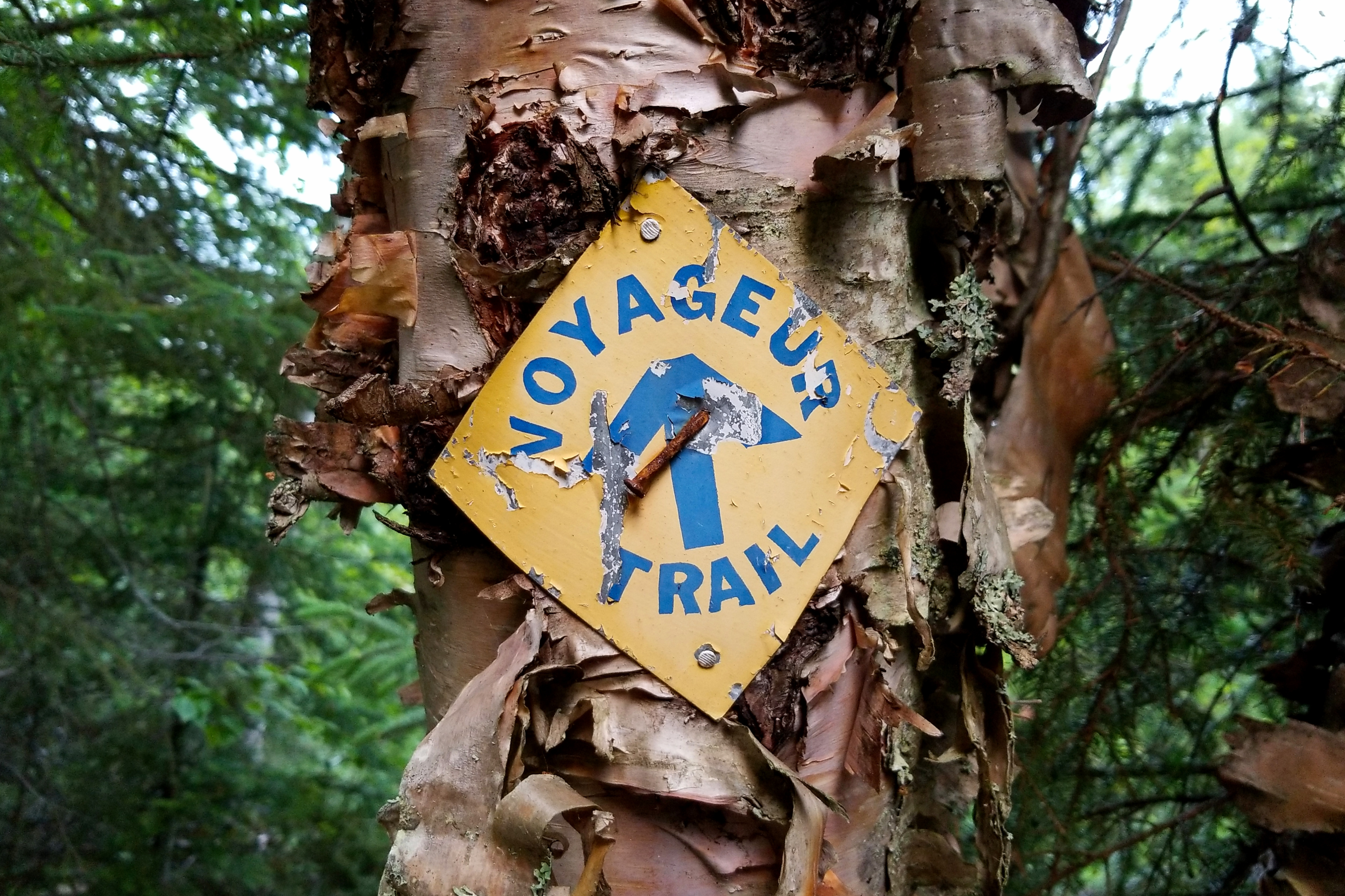
Marker of the Voyageur Hiking Trail in Canada

Trail blazing or way marking is the practice of marking paths in outdoor recreational areas with signs or markings that follow each other at certain, though not necessarily exactly defined, distances and mark the direction of the trail.

A blaze in the beginning meant "a mark made on a tree by slashing the bark" (The Canadian Oxford Dictionary). Originally a waymark was "any conspicuous object which serves as a guide to travellers; a landmark" (Oxford English Dictionary). Today, paint (most prevalent), carvings, affixed markers, posts, flagging, cairns, and crosses, are commonly used.

Blaze frequency and recognizability varies significantly. In some wilderness areas, such as those governed by the US Wilderness Act requiring that the land seem "untrammeled by man," blazes are kept to a minimum. Alternatively, highly utilized public areas, such as busy municipal, county, or state parks, will use frequent and highly visible blazes to maximize trail recognition.

== Types of signage ==
=== Paint ===
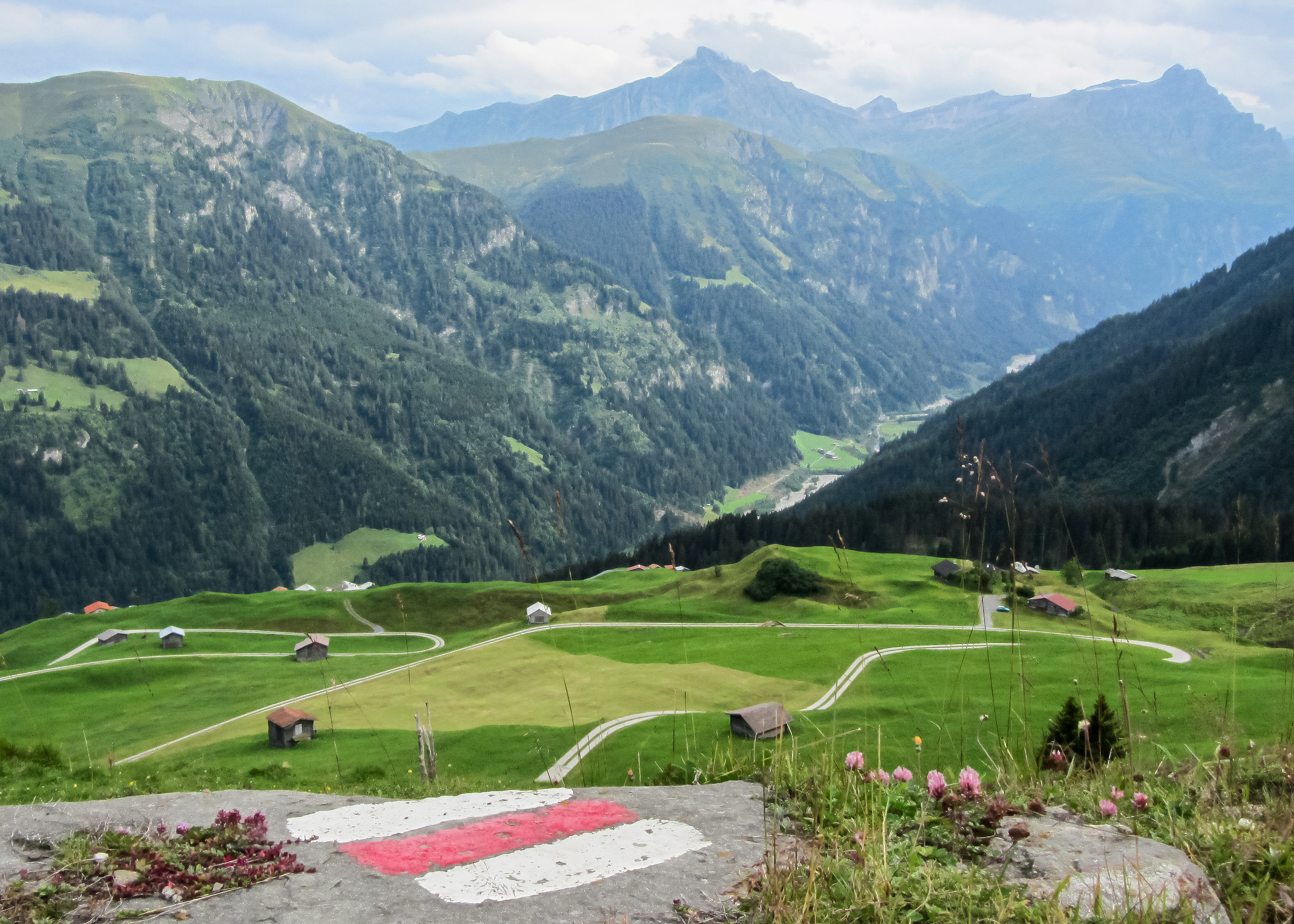
Painted marker in Switzerland

A painted marking of a consistent shape or shapes (often rectangular), dimension and colour or combination of colours is used along the trail route. The system by which blazes are used to signify turns and endpoints in trails (see below) strongly favors the use of paint blazes.

Basic Marker – red, used in Central Europe for difficult or summit trails

European countries usually use systems of painted bars or shapes in more than one colour. The Czech Hiking Markers System uses three bars – usually one color in between two white bars, with different meanings attached to different colours – in a 10 cm x 10 cm square. Red is often used to mark difficult or summit trails. Arrows of similar design signal a change of direction.

This system was first used in today's Czech Republic in May 1889, to mark a trail from the town of Štěchovice to a nearby spring. Today there are 42,000 km (26,000 mi) of marked trails in the Czech Republic. This system is used also in Slovakia, Ukraine, Croatia, Romania, Albania, Brazil, Philippines and Mongolia. Poland, Bulgaria and Georgia used very similar system. French, Italian, Austrian and Swiss trails use a similar system of white and coloured stripes. Slovenia, Croatia and other former members of Yugoslavia use Knafelc trail blaze.

In the United States and Canada, a single colour is used, usually white, red, blue or yellow. Trails in South Africa are often marked by yellow footprints painted on trees and rocks.

In Israel, trails are marked by three stripes. A painted stripe surrounded by two white stripes can indicate length with black, green, blue, or red representing short (<10 km) trails, and purple or orange representing longer trails (60 to 100 km). In addition, some trails are represented by specific colour combinations such as the Golan Trail (white, blue, green), the Jerusalem Trail (blue, gold, blue), and the Israel National Trail (white, blue, orange).

Blazes may also be painted on obvious rock surfaces or on posts set into the ground (or on utility poles, fences, or other handy surfaces) where the trail follows a road or goes through fields and meadows.

=== Carvings ===
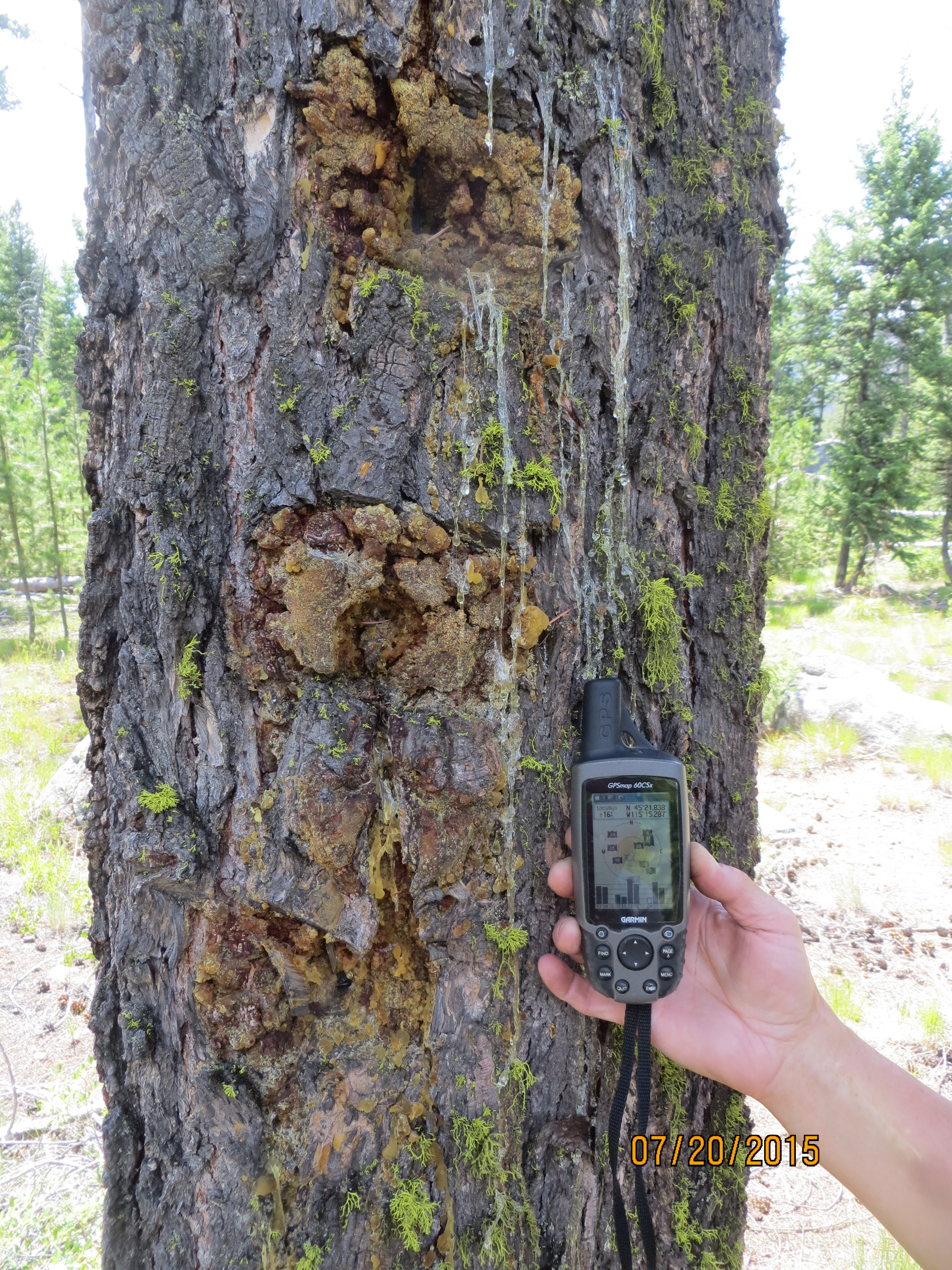
All that is left of hatchet slashes made in 1902 on Three Blaze Trail in Idaho, USA (2015)

Originally a tree would be blazed by axe or hatchet chops (still the dictionary definition) or knife. Most often these are informal routes made by loggers or hunters, or trails descended from those routes, examples of which are found in North America, Australia and New Zealand.

Today, environmental and aesthetic concerns dictate blazing method on public lands, with other navigational aids, such as cairns, and machine-carved posts, used where blazes are unsuitable.

=== Affixed markers ===
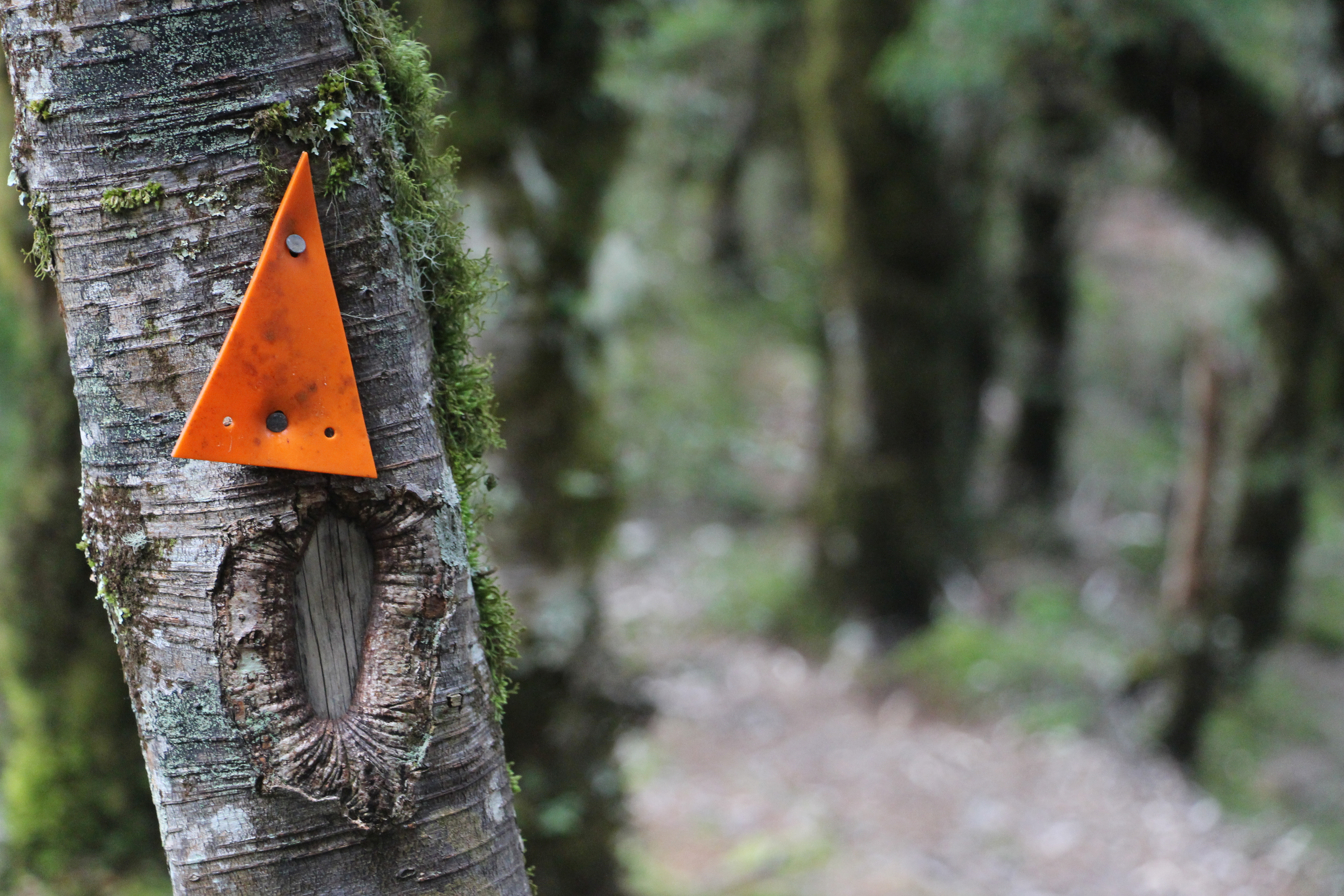
Affixed marker ▲ (NZ)

Long lasting plastic, metal, or even sometimes wooden markers may be affixed to trees, usually with nails. Historically, affixed metal markers often included the shapes, logos, colors, and identity of prominent trailkeeping organizations, such as the Appalachian Mountain Club (AMC), or just the trail's identity (as in the Voyageur Hiking Trail image above).

=== Flagging ===
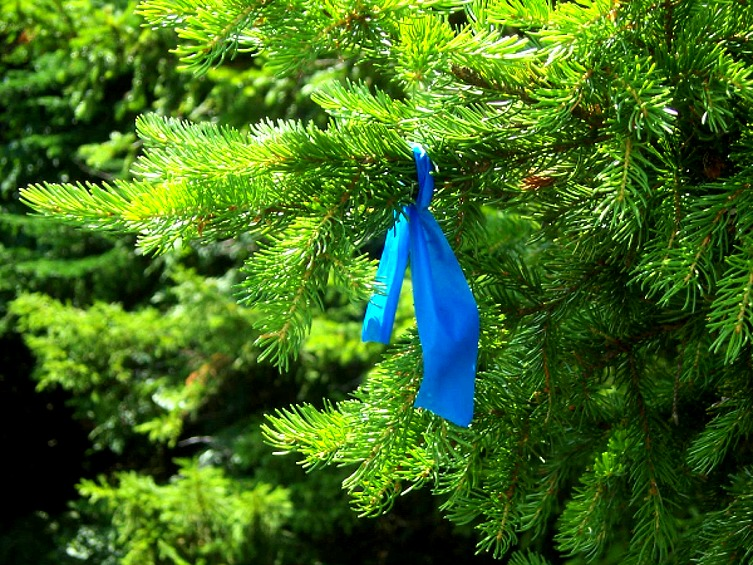
Flagging – a rare use of a tape flag as a blaze on an official trail in the US, here indicating where the trail re-enters the woods after crossing an open ledge where other methods would be unsuitable

Flagging such as surveyor's tape tied around trees or branches is sometimes used to indicate trail routes, but usually only for temporary or unofficial trails, most commonly when a trail route has been selected but the trail itself is under construction.

Trail flagging is the predominant method to mark a mountain hiking trail in Japan. Red ribbons usually indicate an ascent route while yellow ribbon indicate a descent route. On some mountains, a non-standard ribbon colour (white or blue) is used to identify a specific trail.

=== Poles ===
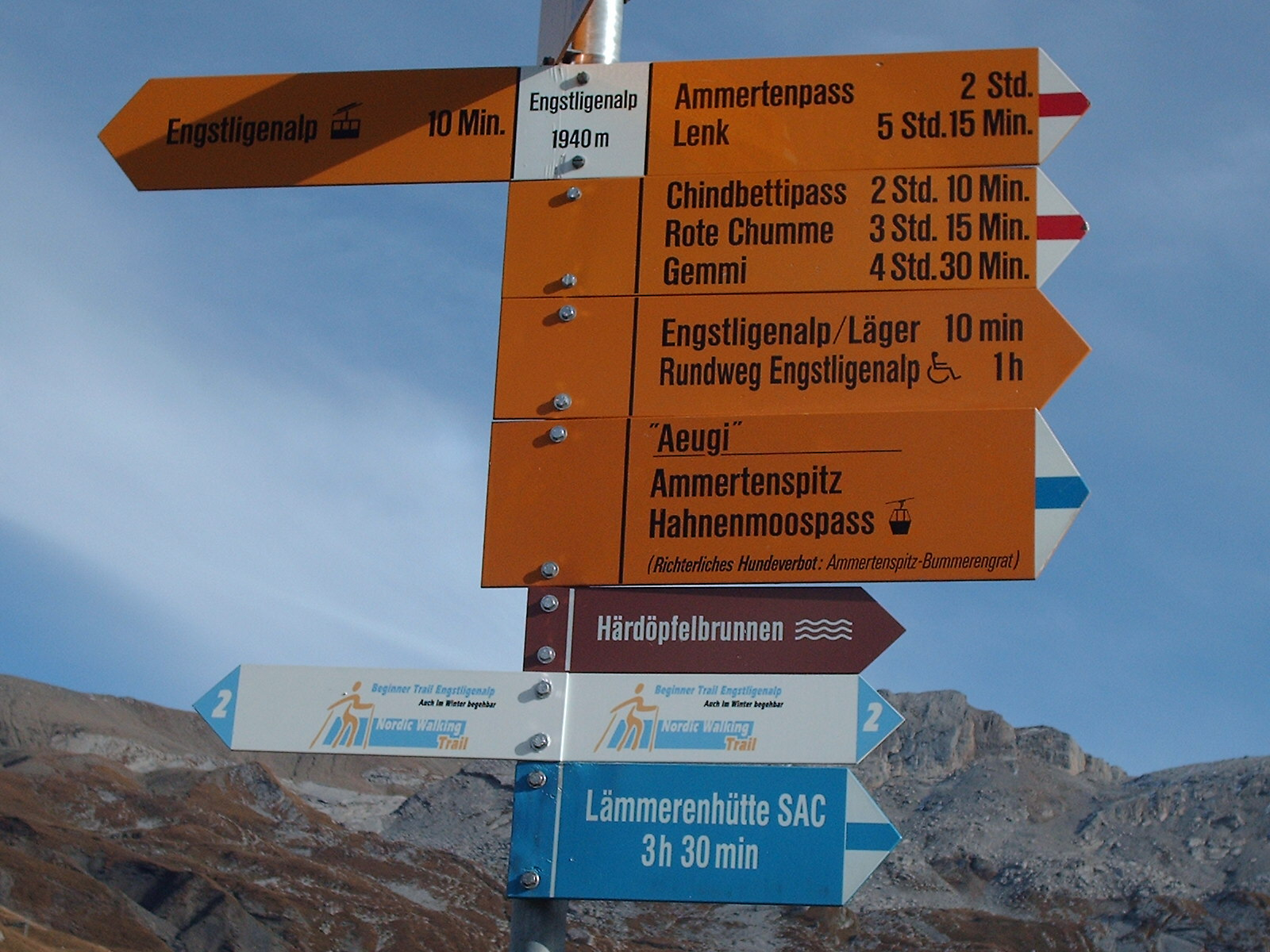
Trail signs in Switzerland

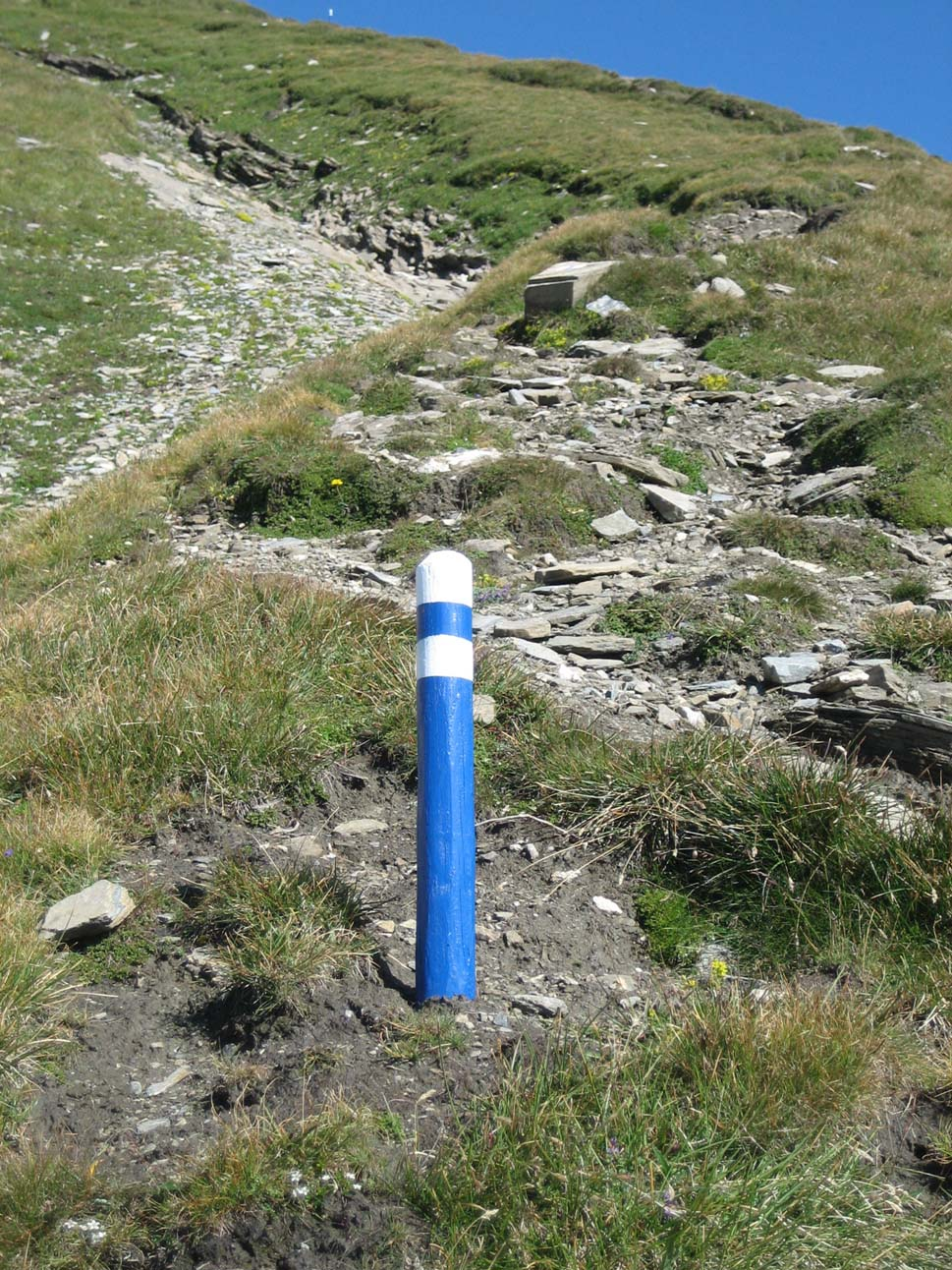
Pole marker on an Alpine route at Piz Uccello, Switzerland

Poles (also known as "wands"), colored or not, often temporary, are often used to keep the trail visible during winter and under snow cover. Poles are standard trail markers in Austria, Canada, USA, the Czech Republic, Switzerland, and Slovakia.

=== Cairns ===
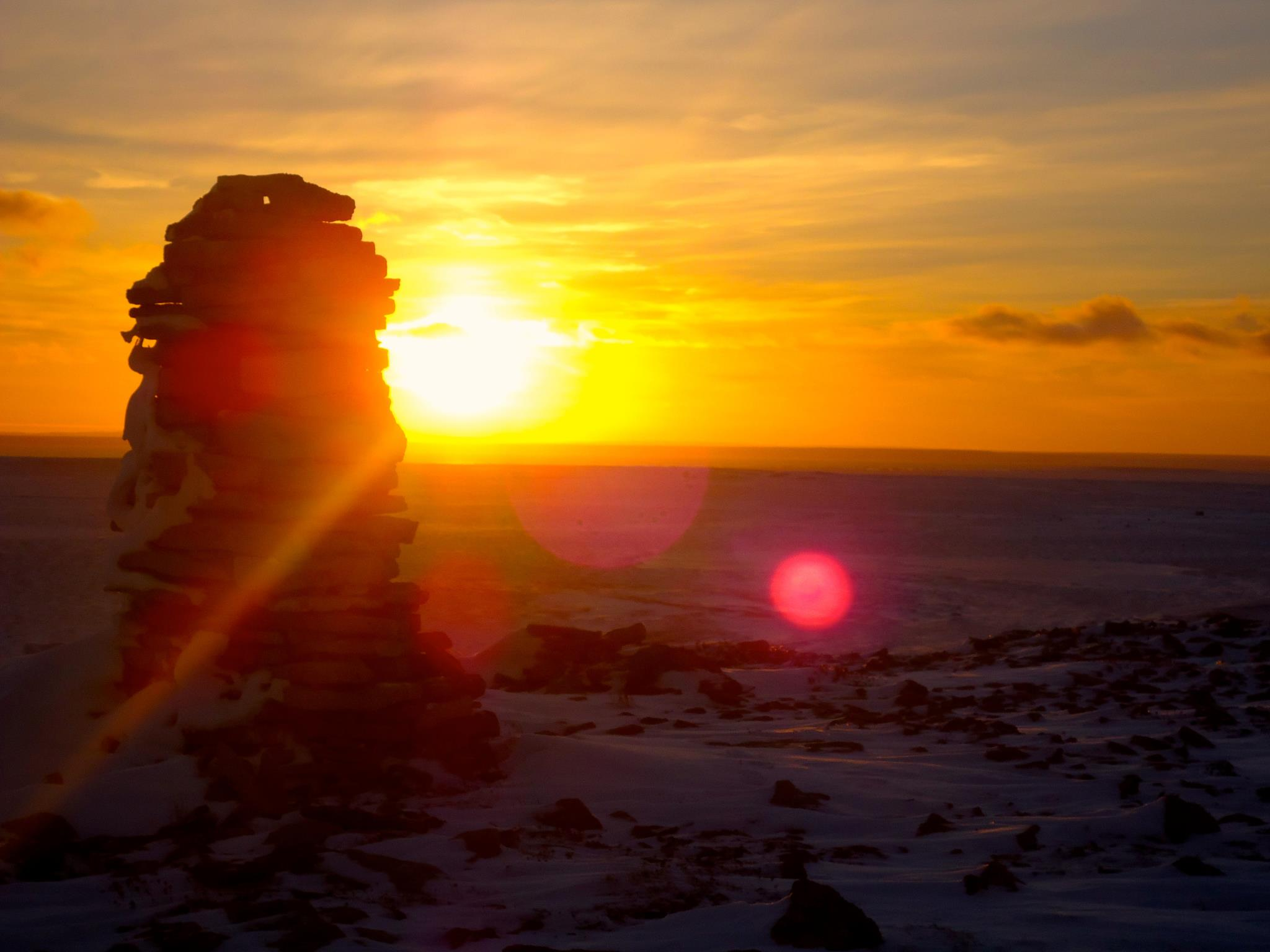
Inuksuit - a cairn in northern Canada were markers used for wayfinding and to locate caches of food or other stores

Cairns are carefully arranged piles of stones. Cairns are most commonly used to indicate trails in open areas, such as higher-elevation alpine areas, where no trees are available, or where conditions may make blazes hard to see. An ancient example is the inuksuk (plural inuksuit), used by the Inuit, Inupiat, Kalaallit, Yupik, and other peoples of the Arctic region of North America. These structures are found from Alaska to Greenland. This region, above the Arctic Circle, is dominated by the tundra biome and has areas with few natural landmarks.

Below the tree line, cairns are used less frequently, often like flagging to indicate informal or unofficial paths or just their junctions with official trails. They may become obscured by snow in areas with heavy winters and may be easily knocked over. In some areas the recreational building of numerous cairns has obscured the proper use of cairns to mark junctions and crossings. In some areas of the United States, park rangers and land managers must disassemble excess cairns when they become eyesores or when they mislead navigation.

Where rocks are scarce, poles can be used. Poles are also frequently used to mark ski and snow shoe trails.

==== Trail ducks ====
Duck is a term used in some parts of the US, generally for a much smaller rock pile than a cairn, typically stacked just high enough to convince the observer it is not natural. For most, two rocks stacked could be a coincidence, but three rocks stacked is a duck. In some regions, ducks also contain a pointer rock (or a couple of stacked rocks) to indicate the direction of the trail.

=== Crosses ===
A wayside cross is a cross by a footpath, track or road, at an intersection, along the edge of a field or in a forest, which often serve as waymarks for walkers and pilgrims or designate dangerous places. They are particularly common in Europe, for example in Germany, Galicia and the Alps. It can be made of wood, stone or metal. Most wayside crosses are designed as crucifixes.

== Systems ==
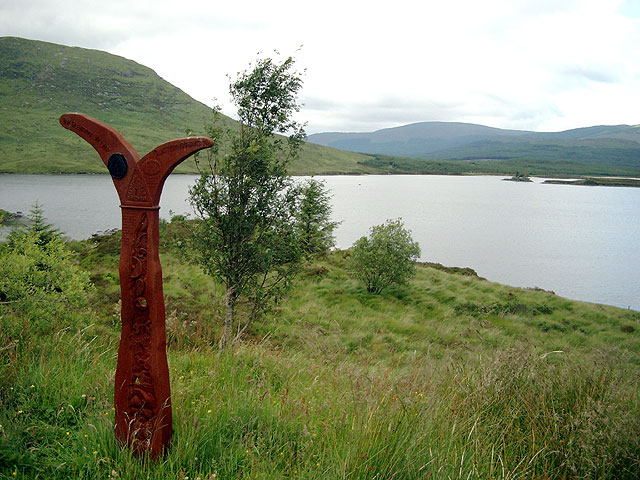
A National Cycle Network (NCN) milepost in Scotland

On a large piece of land, there is likely to be more than one trail. While it might seem obvious that, at minimum, trails should at least take different colours, this is not always done. In Mount Greylock State Reservation, which contains the highest mountain in Massachusetts, all trails other than the Appalachian Trail use the same blue blaze.

Blaze type might also be mixed when different user groups (i.e., snowmobilers, horse riders, mountain bikers) are allowed on trails. For users of faster vehicles, blazes are often larger in order to be seen better at high speeds, and sometimes affixed markers best communicate who may and may not use a trail besides those on foot.

Another possible distinction is by season. In Norway, it is common to use blue for summer routes and red for winter routes. Red routes may traverse lakes and swamps, which are flat and well suited for cross-country skiing in winter, but impassable on foot in summer.

Colours are often assigned simply with an eye toward making sure that no two trails that intersect use the same one, but it can go further than that. On all state land in New York's Catskill Park, for instance, primary trails, especially longer "trunk trails" that go great distances, use red markers if they go in a generally east–west direction and blue if they go north–south. Shorter spur, loop or connector trails generally use yellow blazes.

On occasions when two trails run concurrently, usually at a slightly staggered junction, only one trail may be signed, often with the longer or more heavily trafficked trail's blaze predominating. In other cases, such as southern Vermont where the Appalachian Trail and the Long Trail follow the same path, both trails may use the same white blaze.

A quite different blazing system, called mute blazes was created in the Czech part of the Giant Mountains. The blazes, cut out of sheet metal and painted red, are suspended on high poles, thus being visible to both hikers and skiers. Unlike in classic systems, they do not refer to paths or trails, but show the way to the nearest mountain huts and adjacent towns and villages with the possibility of overnighting and catering.

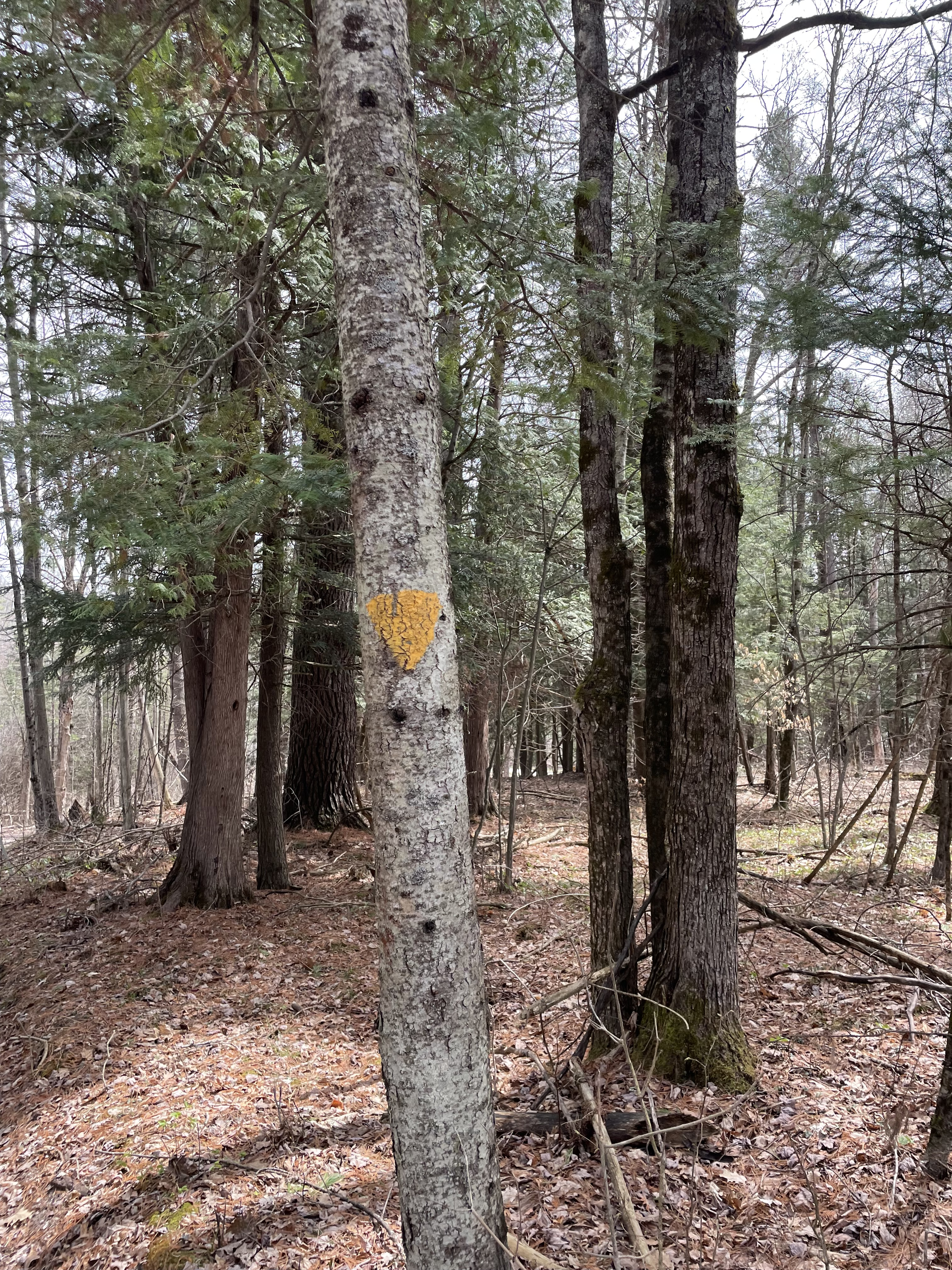
Painted triangular blaze - here, the Boardman River Trail parallels a road near Traverse City, Michigan

National Trails in England and Wales generally use an acorn symbol. The National Cycle Network in the United Kingdom is signposted using a white bicycle symbol on a blue background, with a white route number in an inset box, but with no destination names or distances. National Route numbers have a red background, Regional Route numbers have a blue background. The system of symbols is based on that used by the Danish National Cycle Route network.

The colour used may also indicate the status of the route, for example on rights of way in England and Wales yellow marks are used for footpaths, blue for bridleways, and red for byways open to all traffic.

== Meaning of trail signs ==
Symbols commonly used in trail blazing in the United States. Turn signals are often non-directional—one blaze is placed directly above the other.

Trail blazes guide the user, reassure them they are on the trail, and alert them to turns and, in instances, potential hazards. They are typically augmented with signage at a trail's beginning, end, and intersections with other trails, though some systems make symbolic provision for these.

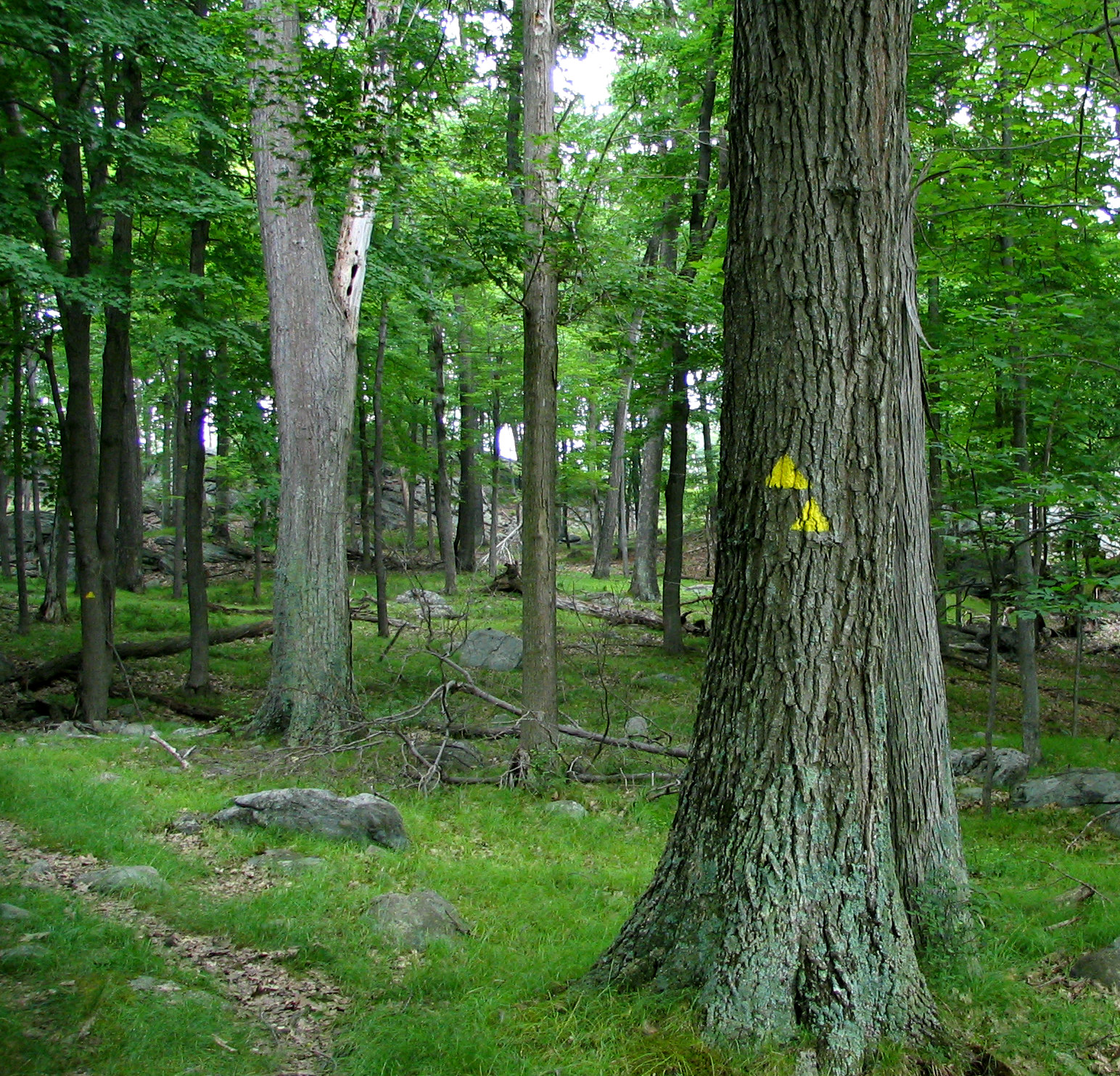
Painted marker in the USA – triangular blaze indicating a left turn, in Harriman State Park, New York, USA

Offset blazes is a system whereby a vertically stacked pair of blazes with the upper one offset in the direction that the trail turns. This system was first used in 1970 on the Beech Trail in Harriman State Park. This system was further refined to where a triangular pattern of blazes would indicate a terminus, its point up or down depending on whether that was the beginning or the end. These began to be used elsewhere and are now fairly common throughout North America, though variations of this system exist. Some trails instead use two blazes painted together at an angle to form an "L" shape to indicate a turn, with the angle between the two blazes indicating the angle and direction of the turn. Also, a few trails indicate turns with two stacked blazes, without an offset, but this can cause confusion as the direction is not implied. In addition, other trails may use two non-offset stacked blazes to indicate the trail goes straight at a location where there may be a tempting mis-turn.

A triangular pattern with its point to the side was also devised for eventualities like spurs or junctions, but these have not caught on.

In some areas, a triangular pattern with its point up indicates that a hiker is at the point of a sharp switchback.

In the Netherlands, signage usually consist of two bars above each other: white-red, yellow-red and red-blue are commonly seen blazes. An upcoming turn is indicated by duplicating the blazes: white-red-white-red, yellow-red-yellow-red, etc. Nowadays, stickers are often used, and instead of duplicating the blaze, the rectangle is cut into an arrow, to indicate direction. A diagonal cross is used to indicate a direction should not be taken: the cross will have the same colours as the blazes (each bar will use a different colour).

== See also ==
- Daymark
- Desire path, a trail created by repeated use, sometimes informally marked
- Landmark
- Paper chase (game)
- Quilt trail
- Sea mark
- Trailhead
- Trail difficulty rating system
- Wayfinding
- Waypoint, a GPS navigation term
