= Michael Oleksa =

American Russian Orthodox missionary (1947–2023)

- Archpriest
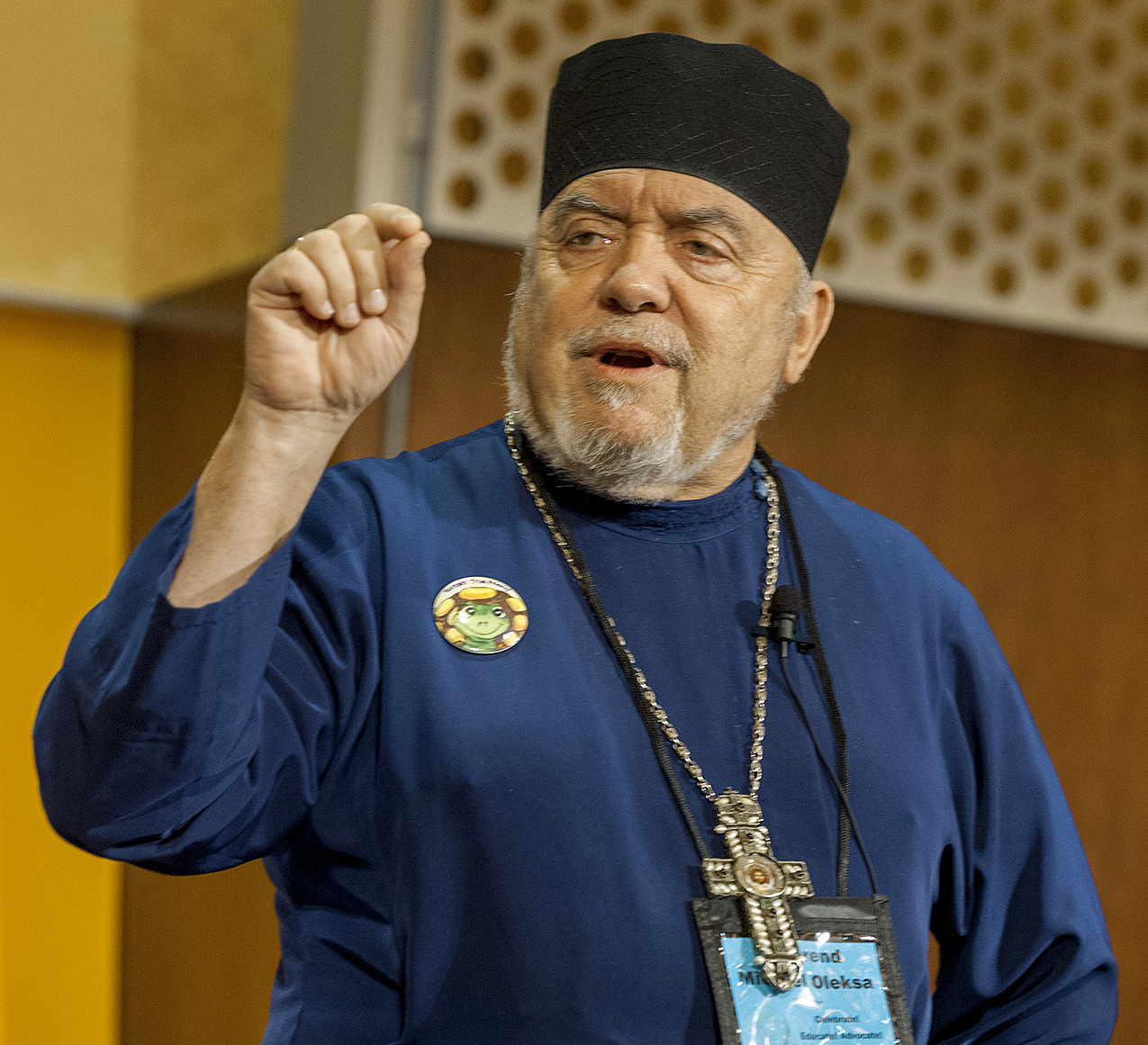
- Oleksa in 2014
- Church: Eastern Orthodox Church

Personal details
- Born: March 16, 1947 Allentown, Pennsylvania
- Died: November 29, 2023 (aged 76) Anchorage, Alaska
- Spouse: Xenia Oleksa
- Children: 4
- Occupation: Russian Orthodox missionary, linguist
- Education: Georgetown University; Saint Vladimir's Orthodox Theological Seminary (MDiv); Orthodox Theological Faculty (PhD)

Michael James Oleksa (March 16, 1947 – November 29, 2023) was an American missionary priest of the Orthodox Church in America, who spent 50 years traveling, speaking, and writing about culture and race in Alaska.

== Early life and education ==
Oleksa was born in Allentown, Pennsylvania, on March 16, 1947. He graduated from Emmaus High School. Oleksa then attended Georgetown University, graduating in 1969. He then began attending St. Vladimir's Seminary in Yonkers, New York, and graduated in 1973 with a Master of Divinity. In 1988, he completed a doctorate at the Orthodox Theological Faculty in Presov, Czechoslovakia, with a focus on Native American history during the period of Russian Alaska.

== Career ==
In 1970, he accepted an invitation from the Alutiiq village of Old Harbor on Kodiak Island in Alaska, where he served as priest with the Russian Orthodox Church.

In 1972, he moved to Kwethluk, where he met his wife and continued his work as a missionary priest in various small communities along the Kuskokwim River.

Oleksa was versed in the fields of history, theology and linguistics and wrote books, articles, and publications focusing on multiple Alaska Native cultures. He created a four-part video series, which aired on PBS, called "Communicating Across Cultures". His work made its way into some of Juneau School District's senior high curriculum, and all three of the University of Alaska campuses. He was also a dedicated public speaker, and has travelled through multiple Alaskan villages speaking about various linguistic topics of interest.

Oleksa accumulated a host of titles along his travels. He is recognized as an "Elder" by the Alaska Federation of Natives, was honored by the Alaska State Legislature and the National Governors Association, and is acknowledged as a "distinguished public servant" by the Board of Regents of the University of Alaska.

Oleksa educated teachers across Alaska on the importance of cross-cultural education and the boundaries of race and culture. The most prominent of his texts that focus on this topic is his collaboration with the Association of Alaska School Boards, which explores the unique cultural fabric of Alaska's educational environment. Prior to his death, he initiated the process to have Olga Michael recognized as a saint by the Russian Orthodox Church.

== Personal life ==
Oleksa was married to Xenia Oleksa, with whom he had two daughters, two sons, five grandsons, two granddaughters, and one great granddaughter.

== Death ==
Oleksa suffered a stroke and died during the early hours of November 29, 2023, in Anchorage, Alaska, at the age of 76. In a statement after his death, the editorial board of the Anchorage Daily News titled him "one of Alaska’s great communicators". Funeral services were held in Saint Innocent Cathedral in Anchorage from on December 4th and 5th, with the burial taking place at Saint John Antiochian Cathedral in Eagle River, after the funeral.

== Selected publications ==
- Alaskan Missionary Spirituality. 1987. Paulist Press, Mahway, New Jersey. 3-35.
- Another Culture / Another World. 2005. Association of Alaska School Boards. Juneau, Alaska.
- “Civilizing” Native Alaska: Federal Support of Mission Schools, 1885–1906. January, 1991. Prepared for the National Education Association. Washington, D.C.
- Evangelism and Culture. 1995. International Review of Mission. Authentic Witness Within Each Culture. Section 1; Conference on World Mission and Evangelism (Salvador, Bahia, Brazil, 1996). LXXXIV No. 335, October 1995. The World Council of Churches. 387–393.
- Father John Veniaminov and Father Jacob Netsvetov. July, 1975. Digital Typography. www.asna.ca.
- I Didn't Even Need a Passport! February 2006. Lit Site, Alaska Traditions.
- Icons and the Cosmos: The Missionary Significance. 1983. International Review of Mission. Issue 1 – Witnessing. Vol. LXXII No. 285, January 1983. The World Council of Churches. 42–123.
- Giving and Receiving. Fall, 2005, AGAIN, The Ancient Christian Faith Today, Vol. 27, No. 3, Page 34.
- Orthodox Alaska: A Theology of Mission. St. Vladimir's Seminary Press, Crestwood, New York 10707. 1998
- Orthodox Missiological Education for the Twenty-First Century. 1996. The Book, the Circle, and the Sandals.Orbis Books, Maryknoll, New York. 83–90.
- Orthodoxy in Alaska: The Spiritual History of the Kodiak Aleut People. 1981. St. Vladimir's Theological Quarterly. Volume 25, Number 1.
- Overwhelmed by Joy. 1983. International Review of Mission. Conversion. Vol. LXXII No. 287, July 1983. The World Council of Churches. 415–420.
- Six Alaskan Native Women Leaders: Pre-Statehood. 1991. Alaska Department of Education, Juneau, Alaska
- The Creoles and Their Contributions to the Development of Alaska. 1990. In Smith, Barbara Sweetland and Redmond J. Barnett (eds.) Russian America: The Forgotten Frontier. Tacoma, WA: Washington State Historical Society. 185–195.
- The Death of Hieromonk Juvenally. 1990. Russia in North America: Proceedings of the 2nd International Conference on Russian America, Sitka, Alaska. August 19–22, 1987. Limestone Press, Fairbanks, Alaska. 322–357.
- The Legacy of St. Vladimir: Byzantium, Russia, America. 1988. Papers presented at a Symposium commemorating the Fiftieth Anniversary of St. Vladimir's Orthodox Theological Seminary, Crestwood, New York. 243–258.
- The Orthodox Church and Orthodox Christian Mission From an Alaskan Perspective. 2001. International Review of Mission. Ecclesiology and Mission (I). Volume XC No. 358, July 2001. The World
- Chilkat Valley News, Feb. 16, 2006, Haines, Alaska. "Priest Brings Multicultural Message" by Christa Sadler
- Conflicting Landscapes American Schooling/Alaska Natives. Co-authored with Clifton Bates. The Kuskokwim Corporation 2008. Distributed by Univ. Alaska Press and University Press of Colorado.
