= Naukan (village) =

Selo in Chukotka Autonomous Okrug, Russia

Naukan Наукан Нывукак (Chukchi (?))
- Selo
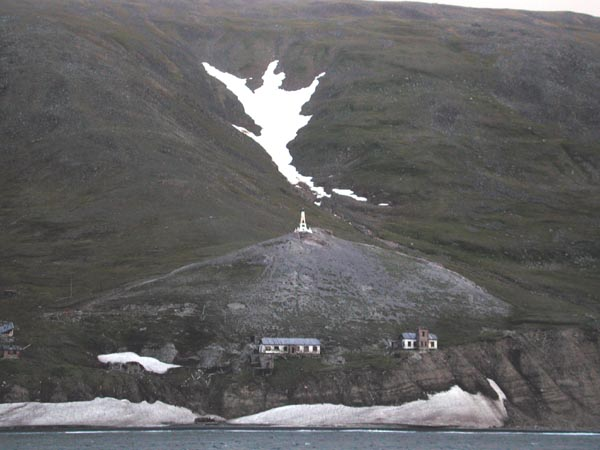
- Interactive map of Naukan
- Location of Naukan Naukan (Chukotka Autonomous Okrug)
- Coordinates: 66°01′38″N 169°42′28″W
- Country: Russia
- Federal subject: Chukotka Autonomous Okrug
- Administrative district: Chukotsky District
- Founded: 14th century (Julian)

Municipal status
  - Municipal district: Chukotsky Municipal District
  - Rural settlement: Naukan (village)
  - Capital of: Naukan (village)

Naukan (Naukan: Nuvuqaq; Russian: Наукан, Yupik: нывукак "Soddy", Nuvuqaq, Inupiaq: Nuuġaq) is a deserted Yupik village on Cape Dezhnev, Russia. Prior to 1958, it was the easternmost settlement in the Eurasian continent. This distinction is now held by the Russian village Uelen in the Chukotsky District, roughly 16 km to the northwest.

== History ==
Naukan was founded in the 14th century. In 1648, Semyon Dezhnev reached Naukan, which is commemorated by a monument bust located on Mount Ingegruk. Other monuments situated in Naukan include a wooden cross built in 1910 at the lighthouse and a monument by the architect B. K. Semenenko built in 1956.

The settlement was disbanded in 1958 as part of an enlargement campaign in rural areas. Those living there were Yupik Inuit who spoke Naukan. Before the eviction of the indigenous people occurred, approximately 400 people lived in the village. The eviction of the inhabitants took place in 1954 in preparation for a possible military confrontation with the United States. The eviction formally ended on November 20, 1958.

The Naukan people were relocated, being partially settled in Chukchi, or moved to places with other Siberian Yupiks. Most of the Naukan people were relocated to the village of Nunyamo, which no longer exists. Today, there are Naukan families living in Chukchi settlements, such as Uelen, Lavrentiya, and Lorino; Siberian Yupik villages, such as Chaplino, Sireniki, and Uelkal; and in the cities of Anadyr, Magadan, and Vologda.

== Notable people ==
- Elizaveta Dobrieva (born 1942), researcher and teacher
