= Naukan people =

Naukan
Нывуӄаӷмит Nyvuqaghmit
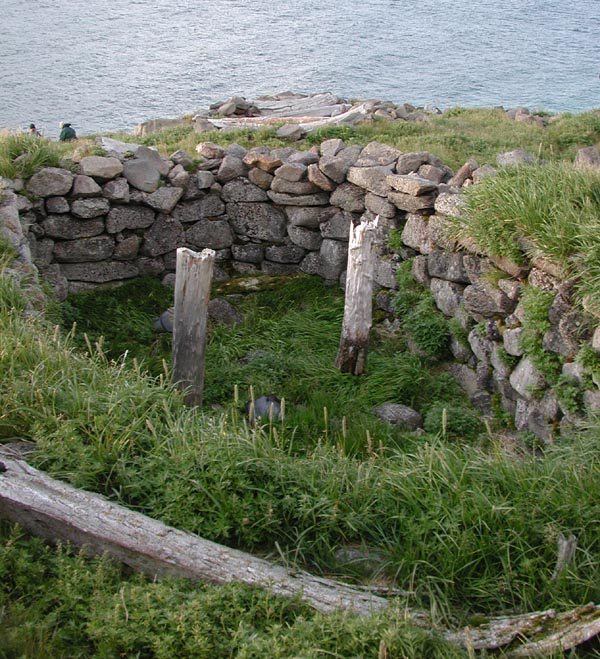
- Remains of a 2,000-year-old pit house at Naukan village

Total population
- 510 (2010)

Regions with significant populations
- Chukotka, Russia

Languages
- Russian, Naukan Yupik language, Chukchi

Religion
- traditional tribal religion

Related ethnic groups
- Chaplino people

The Naukan, also known as the Naukanski, are a Siberian Yupik people and an Indigenous people of Siberia. They live in the Chukotka Autonomous Region of eastern Russia.

== Language ==
The Naukan Yupik language is a Yupik language, belonging to the Eskimo–Aleut languages. Many Naukan people now speak the Chukchi language.

== Culture ==
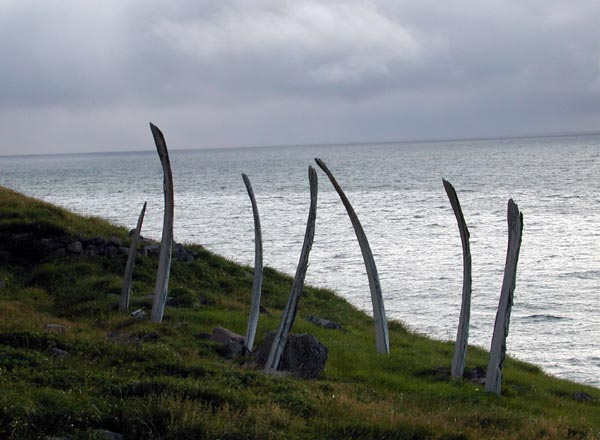
For ceremonial reasons whale bones are erected at Naukan village

Traditionally Naukan people hunted sea mammals. Guests traveled from remote settlements to participate in pol'a', the month-long Naukan whale festival.

== History ==
Archaeological evidence places the Naukan on the Chukotka Peninsula off the Bering Sea back 2,000 years. They used to live on Big Diomede Island and Cape Dezhnev in the Bering Strait. The Soviet Union relocated Naukan people from their traditional coastal village of Naukan in 1958. They now reside in the indigenous village of Lorino.

== Notable people ==
- Elizaveta Dobrieva (born 1942), teacher and researcher

== See also ==
- Yaranga, a conical reindeer-hide tent
- Central Siberian Yupik language
- Sirenik Yupik
- Yupik peoples
- Indigenous small-numbered peoples of the North, Siberia and the Far East
