= Mute blazes in the Giant Mountains =

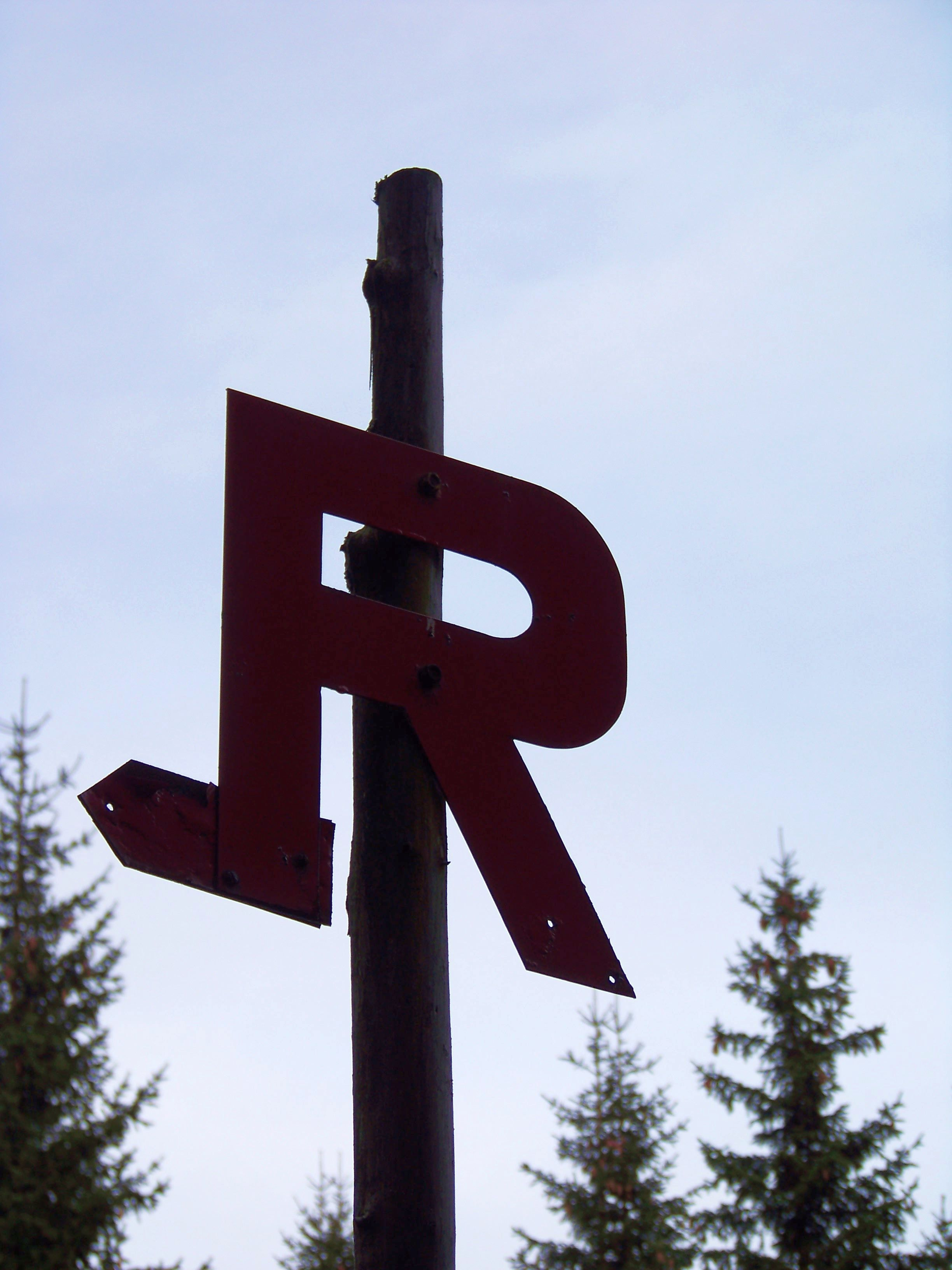
A blaze leading to Rokytnice nad Jizerou

Mute blazes in the Giant Mountains, called also Muttich blazes (Czech: muttichovky), is a system of trail blazing used in the Czech part of the Giant Mountains.

== Description ==
The system is created by the set of blazes, which are cut out of sheet metal and painted red. However, compared to classic blazing systems, they do not mark particular routes or hiking trails. Each sign corresponds to a different object in the mountains, the most frequent being the nearest mountain huts and villages with the possibility of overnighting and catering. The blazes are usually suspended on high poles, which makes them visible even when covered in snow – thus the system can be used by skiers or for winter hiking.

== History ==
The system was invented and introduced in 1923. One of the initial goals was to overcome naming discrepancies between the German and Czech associations, who had been arguing about which language should be used in trail blazing on both sides. The system was created and implemented by Vladislav Muttich, a Czech painter and member of the Czech skiing society. Although another system was introduced after World War II, the old one proved popular and efficient and thus has been left unchanged in the Czech part of the mountain range.
