= Olga Michael =

American saint

Saint Olga Arrsamquq Michael (Russian: Ольга Аррсамкук Майкл)
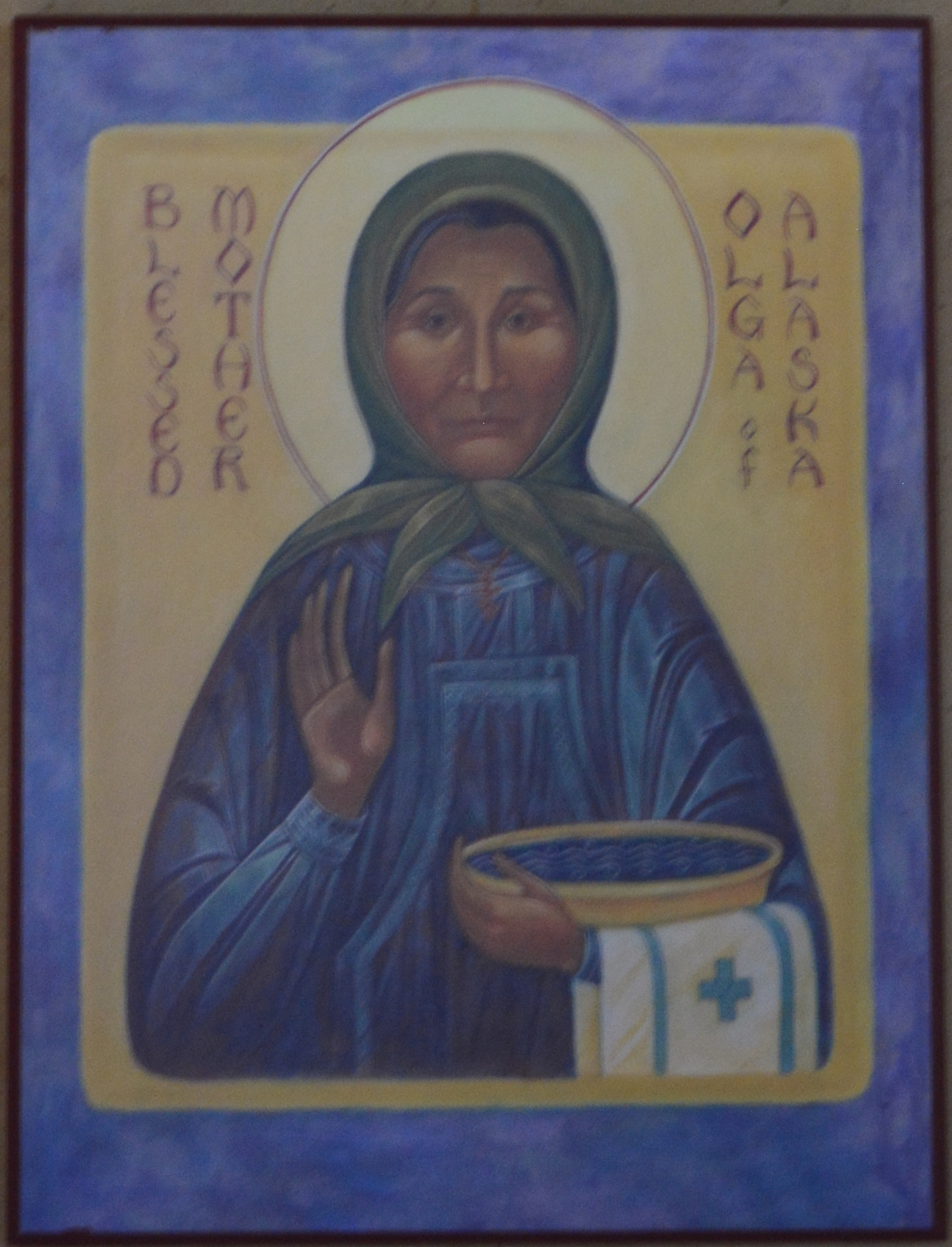
- Icon of St. Olga of Alaska, St. Michael's Cathedral, Sitka

Matushka
- Born: February 3, 1916; Kwethluk, Territory of Alaska, U.S.
- Died: November 8, 1979 (aged 63); Kwethluk, Alaska, U.S.
- Venerated in: Eastern Orthodox Church
- Canonized: June 19, 2025, Kwethluk, Alaska by the Orthodox Church in America
- Feast: October 27
- Attributes: Wearing a midwife uniform, bowl of water, kuspuk, towel, northern lights
- Patronage: Midwives, sexual abuse victims

Olinka "Olga" Arrsamquq Michael (Russian: Ольга Аррсамкук Майкл; née Arrsamquq, February 3, 1916 – November 8, 1979), known as Olga Michael, Olga of Alaska, Olga of Kwethluk, or Matushka Olga (Russian: матушка Ольга), was a Native American Eastern Orthodox midwife, matushka, and saint from Alaska. In 2025, she became the first North American woman, and the first Yup'ik person, to be canonized as an Eastern Orthodox saint.

Olga Arrsamquq was born in Kwethluk, Alaska to Native American parents of the Yup'ik people in 1916. In 1935, she married Nicolai Michael, a man who would go on to become an Orthodox priest. From there she became a "matushka" (a Russian term for a priest's wife), becoming important in the religious community. Outside of church life, she worked as a midwife, a traditional healer, and an English teacher. She became an important figure of advice and counseling, particularly among women. Michael died of cancer on November 8, 1979, in Kwethluk.

After her death, a number of people reported seeing Michael in visions or dreams as a comforting figure, sometimes as a healer of prior abuse. Long considered to be a potential Orthodox saint, her eventual canonization was announced by the Orthodox Church in America in 2023. She was canonized on June 19, 2025, in Kwethluk, in a ceremony overseen by several prominent members of the clergy. With her canonization, she became the first North American woman, and the first member of the Yup'ik people, to be made an Eastern Orthodox saint.

== Life ==
=== Early life ===
Olinka Arrsamquq was born on February 3, 1916 in the village Kwethluk in the Territory of Alaska, in the United States, to Native American parents of the Yup'ik tribe. She was given the baptismal name Olga, which became commonly used to refer to her.

=== Marriage and role as matushka ===
Arrsamquq later married Nicolai Michael on January 7, 1935, as part of an arranged marriage in accordance with local custom. She came to be known by the name Olga Michael, after her husband. Nicolai would found and manage a general store in Kwethluk, along with starting the village's first US Post Office. Her husband, not particularly religious when they first married, later became an Eastern Orthodox priest, being ordained in 1963, and becoming the first priest from the village of Kwethluk. He eventually came to the rank of archpriest. After her husband's ordination, Olga Michael became a matushka (meaning "mother" in Russian, as a term of respect), a term for the wife of a priest. With this role, she became central to the community of the local parish. She was known for her generosity, which included baking food for neighbors, and making and giving away clothes to others.

Olga and her husband, Nicolai Michael, had thirteen children, eight of whom lived to adulthood.

=== Work as a midwife, healer, and teacher ===
Michael worked as a midwife in the village, helping deliver newborn infants. She also worked as a healer, and incorporated traditional Yup'ik medicinal practices into her methods. Her input and counsel was often sought after in her community, particularly among women. Later in her life, Michael worked as a teacher, instructing adults in learning English as their second language.

=== Death ===
On November 8, 1979, she died of cancer in Kwethluk. After her death, people in the region reported what they thought were miracles related to the event. These included stories of ground unfreezing suddenly at her burial, flocks of birds flying over her burial at times when they should have already flown south, and a sudden warm spell allowing river travel to her funeral.

== Reported miracles, canonization and veneration ==
=== Reported miracles ===
After Michael's death, people began to report seeing her in dreams and visions as a healing figure. An Orthodox priest, Michael Oleksa, who had previously written a book that included details about Michael, reported that in about 2003, a non-Christian woman from New York reached out to him about a vision she had regarding Michael. She had a dream of being healed of her prior sexual abuse by a woman who called herself Olga. According to Oleksa, the characterization of the woman who appeared in the dream fit traditional Yup'ik ways of living, even though the New York woman claimed to have no prior knowledge of Alaska. The woman eventually converted to Orthodoxy, according to Oleksa. The Orthodox Church in America also records numerous miracles, visions, and other phenomena related to Michael.

=== Canonization ===
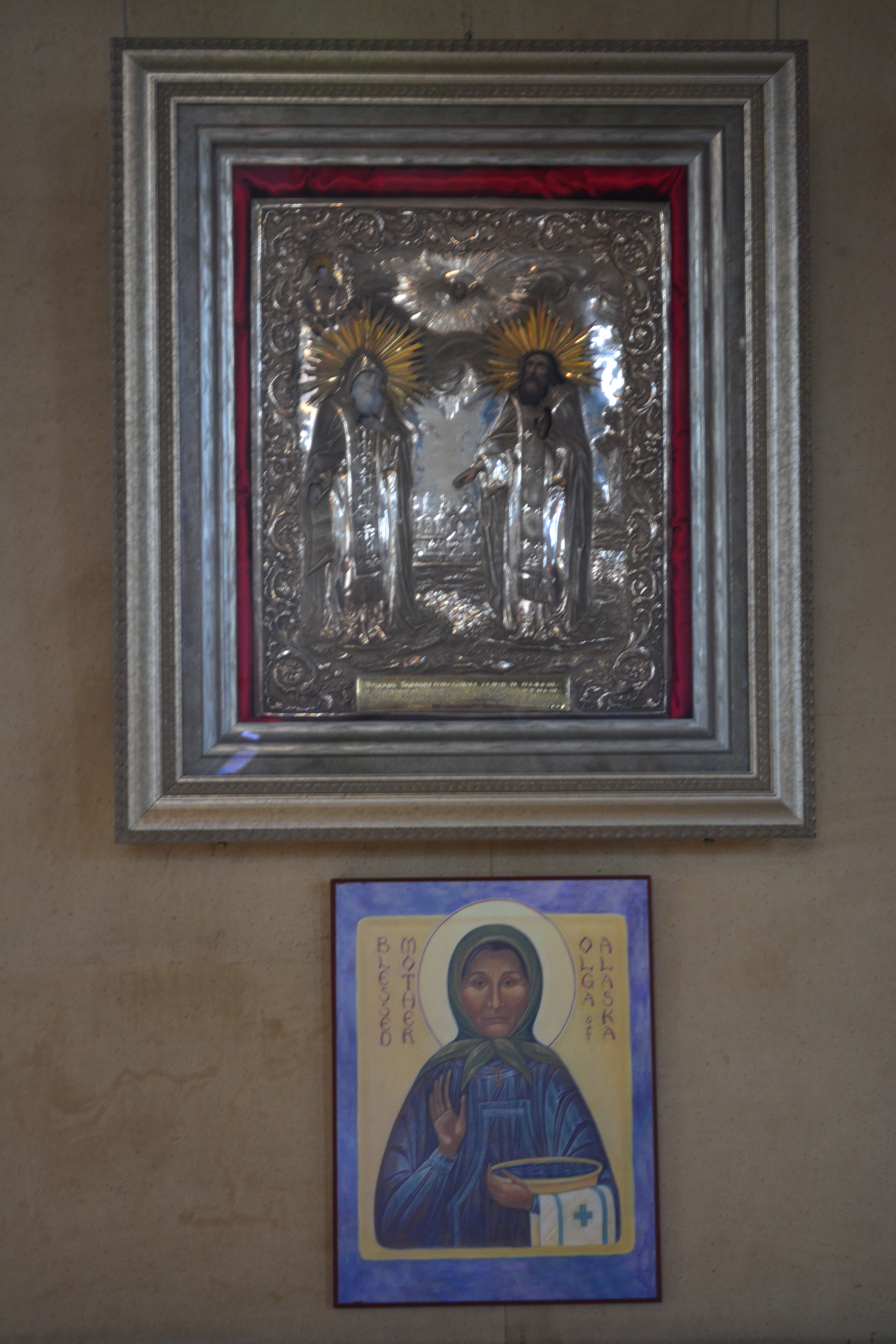
Interior of St. Michael's Cathedral, Sitka, Alaska

After her 1979 death, Michael had long been considered to have the potential to be made a saint in the Orthodox Church, and a 2015 article from The Canadian Journal of Orthodox Christianity described her as "an unofficial patron saint of battered and abused women".

According to Bishop Alexei, head of the Diocese of Alaska of the Orthodox Church in America, numerous believers, particularly Alaskans and including Oleksa, had been pushing for Michael's canonization for decades. Oleksa compiled numerous accounts of miracles concerning Michael, and sent them to Bishop Alexei. Alexei then presented the accounts to the Orthodox Church in America's Holy Synod of Bishops. On November 2, 2023, Alexei formally petitioned the Synod to canonize Michael. The Holy Synod of Bishops of the Orthodox Church in America proclaimed on November 8, 2023, that Michael would be glorified (another term for canonization) at a future date.

On November 16, 2024, Michael's grave in Kwelthluk was exhumed in the process of bringing her remains, considered holy relics in the Eastern Orthodox religion, to Saint Nicholas Church in the town, in a religious process known as the uncovering of relics, the last major step before her canonization. The canonization took place on June 19, 2025, at St. Nicholas Church in Kwelthluk, and was presided over by the primate of the Orthodox Church in America, Metropolitan Tikhon. About 300 people traveled to the small village for the ceremonies, including prominent members of the Orthodox clergy. With this canonization, she became the first woman from North America, and the first Yup'ik person, to be canonized saint in the Eastern Orthodox Church.

=== Veneration ===
The Orthodox Church in America's Diocese of Alaska has proposed building a new, large church in Kwelthluk to house Michael's relics, and as of 2024 were working with the Kwethluk’s tribal council to secure land for the project.

Icons of Olga often show her wearing a kuspuk, and holding items such as a basin of water and a towel (referencing her work as a midwife), or with northern lights in the background. An official icon has her holding the church that is planned to be built to house her relics. Many icons painted of Saint Olga also contain words she was reported to have spoken in a dream, "God can create beauty out of complete desolation".

Michael is commemorated on October 27. Following a request from Metropolitan Tikhon of All America and Canada, the Holy Synod of the Russian Orthodox Church also decided to formally add St. Olga of Alaska to its liturgical calendar for October 27.

== See also ==
- List of American Eastern Orthodox Saints
- Peter the Aleut - another Native American Eastern Orthodox saint
