= Kuspuk =

Alaskan hooded overshirt

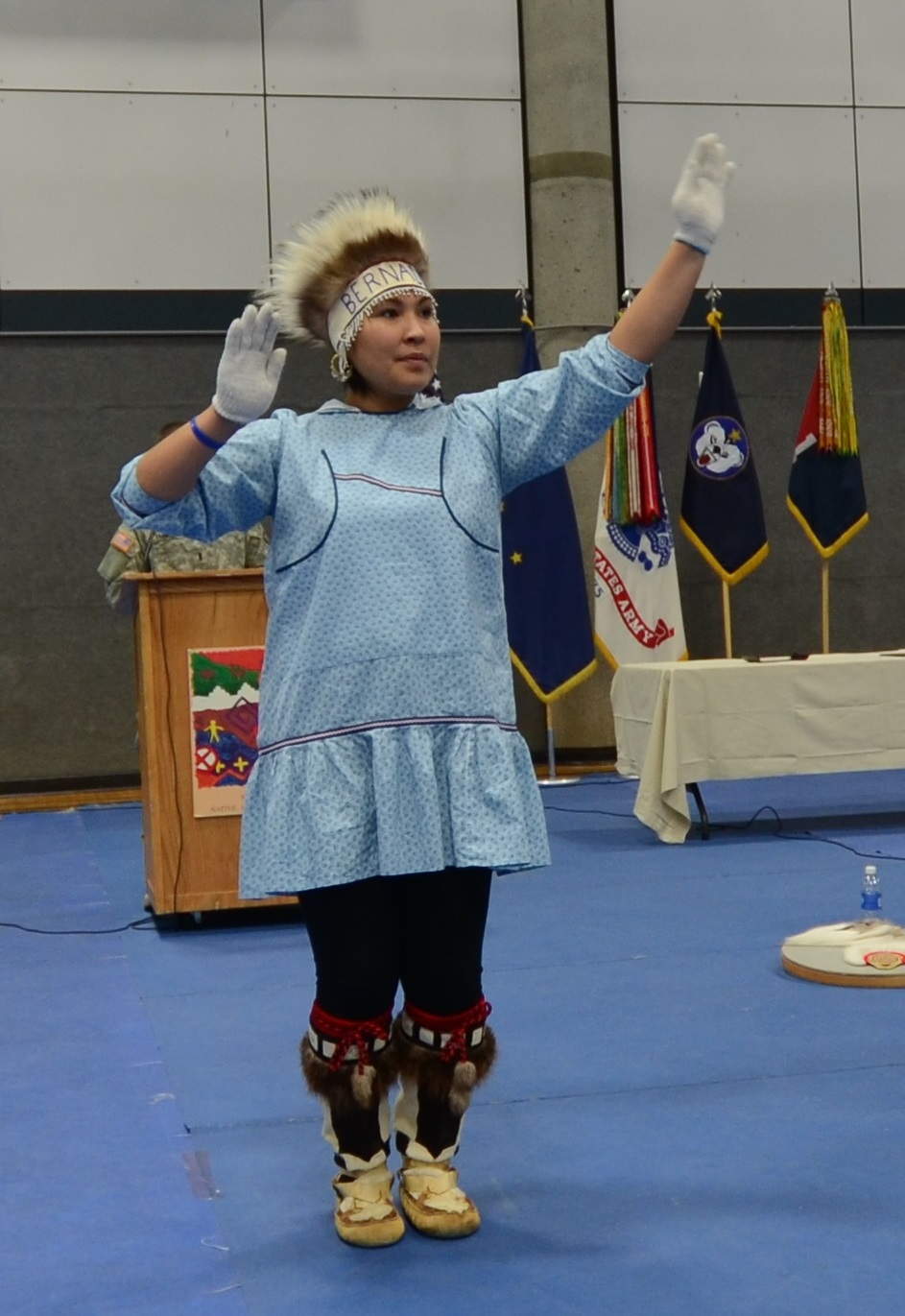
Alaska Native dancer performing in a kuspuk

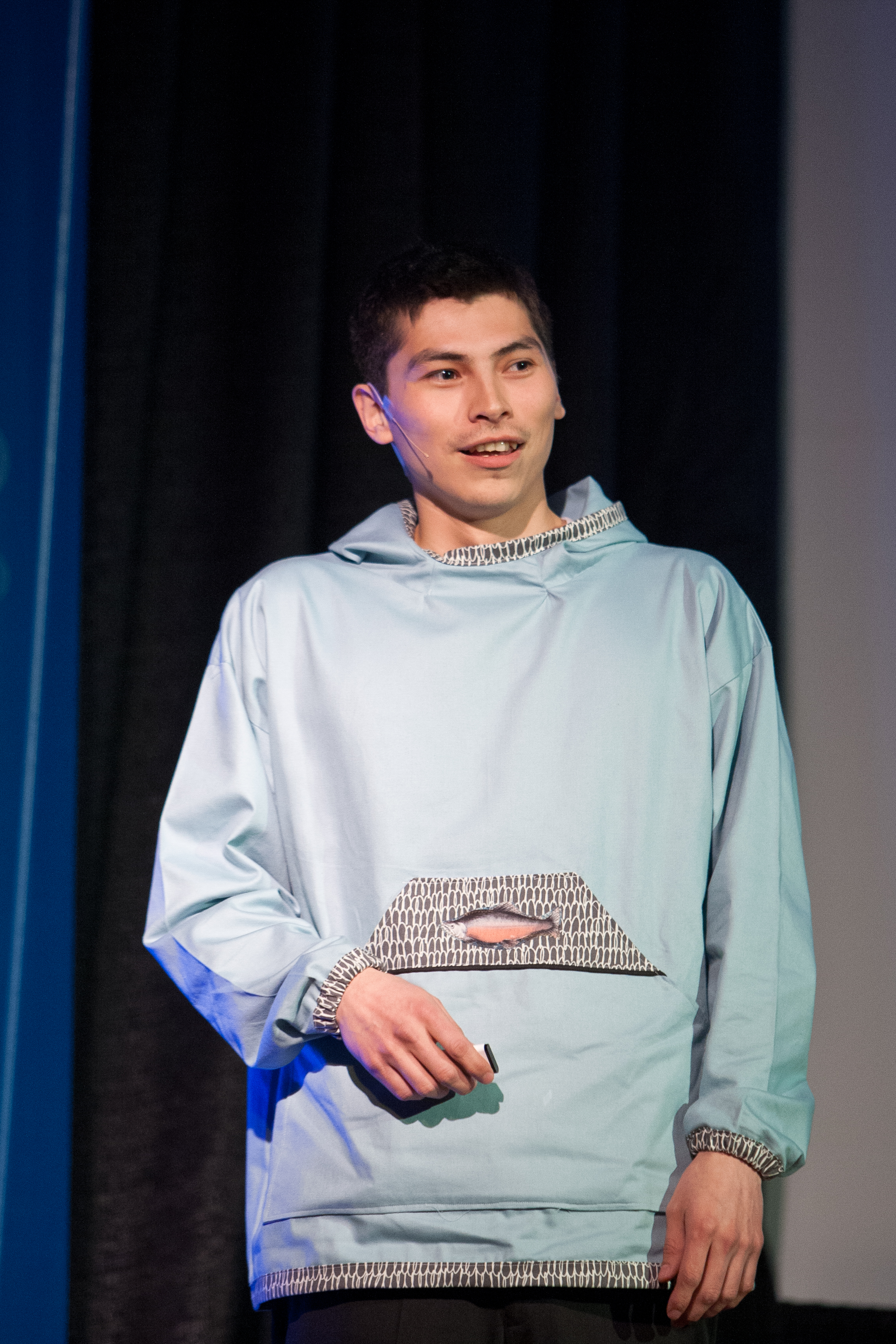
Man wearing a contemporary kuspuk

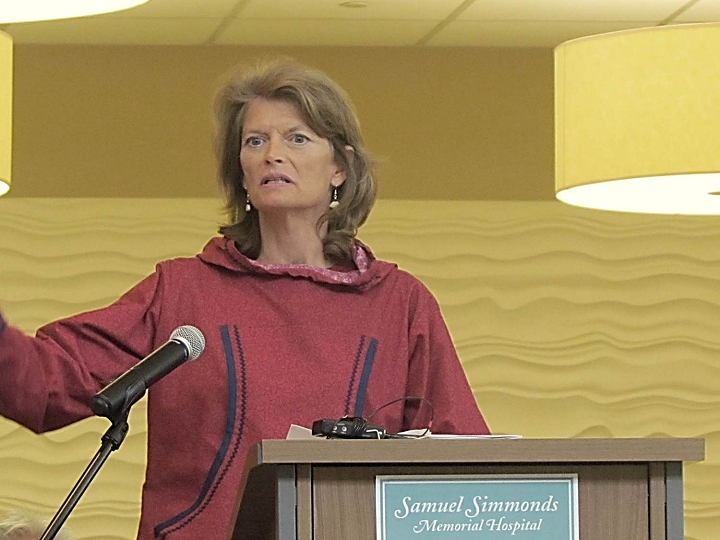
Senator Lisa Murkowski wearing a kuspuk

A kuspuk (/ˈɡʌs.pʌk/) (Central Yupik: qaspeq; Inupiaq: atikłuk) is a hooded overshirt with a large front pocket commonly worn among Alaska Natives. Kuspuks are tunic-length, falling anywhere from below the hips to below the knees. The bottom portion of kuspuks worn by women may be gathered and akin to a skirt. Kuspuks tend to be pullover garments, though some have zippers.

Though kuspuks are traditionally a Yup'ik garment, they are now worn by both men and women of many Native groups, as well as by non-Natives. The garment was originally made of animal skin or gut and was worn over a fur parka to keep the parka clean. As stores became more common in Bush villages, kuspuks began to be made of calico grain sacks. Kuspuks are now generally made from brightly printed cotton calico, velvet, or corduroy trimmed with rickrack. Today, kuspuks are often worn as a blouse with pants.

Many Alaska legislators and their staff members wear kuspuks on Fridays. The tradition was started by Representative Mary Kapsner (now Mary Sattler Peltola) of Bethel around 2000. The legislative dress code, however, requires that kuspuks be worn with dark pants. Legislators' enthusiasm for kuspuks has contributed to their rising popularity in the state.

Travelers wearing kuspuks have faced scrutiny from airport security screeners the federal Transportation Security Administration because of the garment's looseness and bulkiness. Screeners have asked passengers to remove their kuspuks. Senators Lisa Murkowski and Mark Begich have criticized this security practice as culturally insensitive, as the kuspuk may not always be easily removed, since it may be worn "like a T-shirt or blouse", with no other shirts underneath.

Pope John Paul II was presented a kuspuk as a gift when he visited Alaska in 1981. In 2023, Matushka Olga of Alaska was canonized as a saint in Russian Orthodox Church, thus establishing kuspuk in Russian Orthodox iconography.

== Native names ==
language	parka cover	etymology
Yukon-Kuskokwim Yup'ik	qaspeq	< qai-peq < qai- ‘surface; top’ + -peq a postbase: ‘one at N’ (compare ilupeq ‘undershirt’ < ilu ‘interior’)
Chevak Cup’ik	qaspeq	id.
Nunivak Cup'ig	qasper	id.
Akuzipik (St. Lawrence Island)	qiipaghaq	< qiipaq-ghaq < 'qiipaq ‘thread’ + -ghaq a postbase: ‘one like N’
Iñupiaq (North Slope)	atikłuk	< atigi 'pullover style parka' + -łuk a postbase: 'something resembling or having an association with a N'
Iñupiaq (Malimiut)	atikłuk	id.
Iñupiaq (King Island)	uġiłiqaaq

== See also ==
- Yup'ik clothing
