= Kwethluk, Alaska =

Kwethluk Kuiggluk
- City
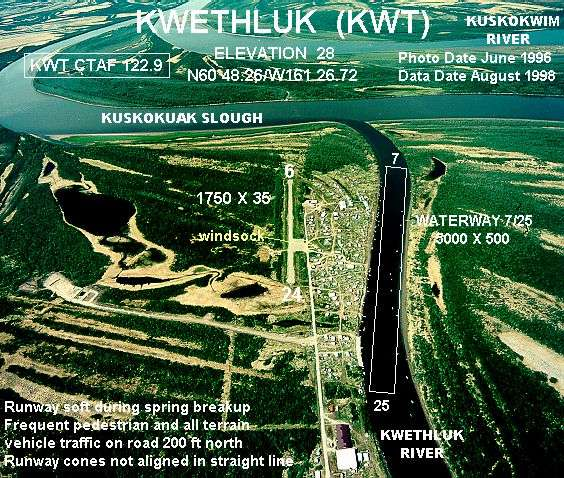
- Aerial photograph of Kwethluk

- Location in Alaska
- Coordinates: 60°48′8″N 161°25′7″W
- Country: United States
- State: Alaska
- Census area: Bethel
- Incorporated: 1975

Government
  - Mayor: Samuel Nicori, 2017
  - State senator: Lyman Hoffman (D)
  - State rep.: Conrad McCormick (D)

Area
  - Total: 11.82 sq mi (30.62 km^{2})
  - Land: 10.17 sq mi (26.35 km^{2})
  - Water: 1.64 sq mi (4.26 km^{2})
- Elevation: 9.8 ft (3 m)

Population (2020)
  - Total: 812
  - Density: 79.8/sq mi (30.81/km^{2})
- Time zone: UTC-9 (Alaska (AKST))
  - Summer (DST): UTC-8 (AKDT)
- ZIP code: 99621
- Area code: 907
- FIPS code: 02-42380
- GNIS feature ID: 1405119

Kwethluk (/ˈkwiːθlʊk/ KWEETH-luuk; Central Yupik: Kuiggluk) is a city in Bethel Census Area in the U.S. state of Alaska. As of the 2020 census, Kwethluk had a population of 812. It is the birthplace of Saint Olga of Alaska.

== Geography ==
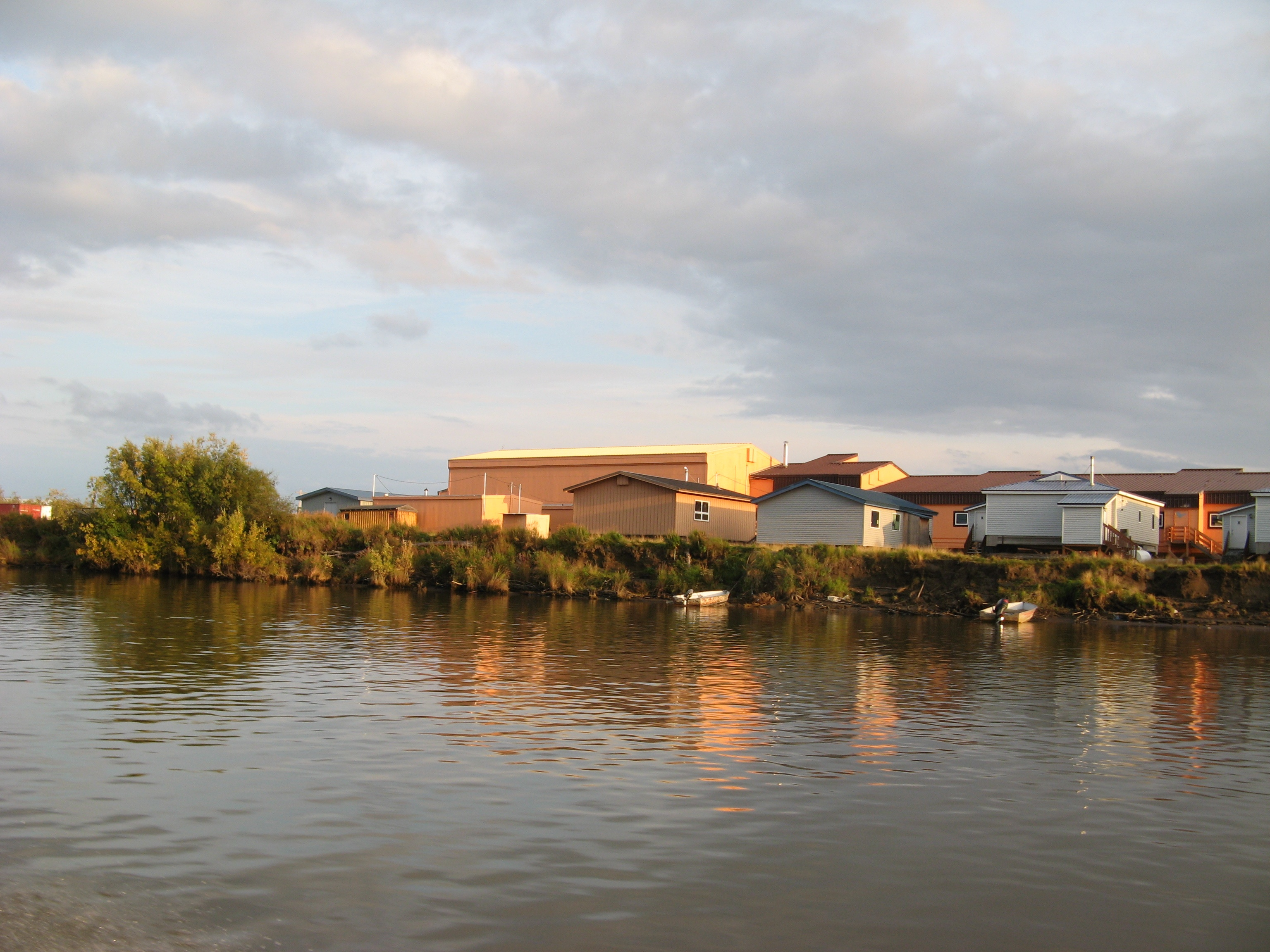
Kwethluk from the river

Kwethluk is located at 60°48′8″N 161°25′7″W (60.802332, -161.418556). It lies at the confluence of the Kuskokwim and Kwethluk rivers in the Yukon-Kuskokwim Delta. The constantly changing channel gives the village its name: Kwethluk is derived from the Yupik kuik, meaning "river", plus -rrluk, meaning "bad, unnatural".

According to the United States Census Bureau, the city has a total area of 11.7 square miles (30 km^{2}), of which, 10.0 square miles (26 km^{2}) of it is land and 1.7 square miles (4.4 km^{2}) of it (14.76%) is water.

== Demographics ==
Historical population
Census	Pop.	Note	%±
1880	75		—
1940	186		—
1950	242		30.1%
1960	325		34.3%
1970	408		25.5%
1980	454		11.3%
1990	558		22.9%
2000	713		27.8%
2010	721		1.1%
2020	812		12.6%
U.S. Decennial Census

Kwethluk first appeared on the 1880 U.S. census as the unincorporated Eskimo village of Kuigglurmiut. It did not appear again until 1940 as the village of "Quithlook." The spelling was changed in 1950 to Kwethluk and the village formally incorporated as a city in 1975.

=== 2020 census ===
As of the 2020 census, Kwethluk had a population of 812. The median age was 24.0 years. 39.4% of residents were under the age of 18 and 8.0% of residents were 65 years of age or older. For every 100 females there were 121.3 males, and for every 100 females age 18 and over there were 124.7 males age 18 and over.

0.0% of residents lived in urban areas, while 100.0% lived in rural areas.

There were 177 households in Kwethluk, of which 61.0% had children under the age of 18 living in them. Of all households, 38.4% were married-couple households, 33.3% were households with a male householder and no spouse or partner present, and 19.8% were households with a female householder and no spouse or partner present. About 21.5% of all households were made up of individuals and 4.5% had someone living alone who was 65 years of age or older.

There were 229 housing units, of which 22.7% were vacant. The homeowner vacancy rate was 0.0% and the rental vacancy rate was 15.0%.

Racial composition as of the 2020 census
Race	Number	Percent
White	15	1.8%
Black or African American	0	0.0%
American Indian and Alaska Native	773	95.2%
Asian	4	0.5%
Native Hawaiian and Other Pacific Islander	0	0.0%
Some other race	0	0.0%
Two or more races	20	2.5%
Hispanic or Latino (of any race)	0	0.0%

=== 2000 census ===
As of the census of 2000, there were 713 people, 153 households, and 132 families residing in the city. The population density was 71.4 inhabitants per square mile (27.6/km^{2}). There were 199 housing units at an average density of 19.9 units per square mile (7.7 units/km^{2}). The racial makeup of the city was 4.77% White, 0.14% Black or African American, 92.85% Native American, 0.28% Asian, and 1.96% from two or more races.

There were 153 households, out of which 62.1% had children under the age of 18 living with them, 57.5% were married couples living together, 20.3% had a female householder with no husband present, and 13.1% were non-families. 10.5% of all households were made up of individuals, and none had someone living alone who was 65 years of age or older. The average household size was 4.66 and the average family size was 5.08.

In the city, the age distribution of the population shows 47.7% under the age of 18, 9.4% from 18 to 24, 24.7% from 25 to 44, 12.5% from 45 to 64, and 5.8% who were 65 years of age or older. The median age was 20 years. For every 100 females, there were 116.7 males. For every 100 females age 18 and over, there were 113.1 males.

The median income for a household in the city was $25,417, and the median income for a family was $27,500. Males had a median income of $24,063 versus $14,375 for females. The per capita income for the city was $6,503. About 29.2% of families and 29.5% of the population were below the poverty line, including 31.4% of those under age 18 and 35.9% of those age 65 or over.

== Education ==
It is served by the K-12 Ket'acik & Aapalluk Memorial School, operated by the Lower Kuskokwim School District. As of 2018 it has about 250 students and 15 teachers.
