= Yaranga =

Tent-like traditional dwelling structure

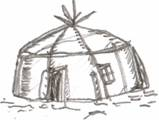

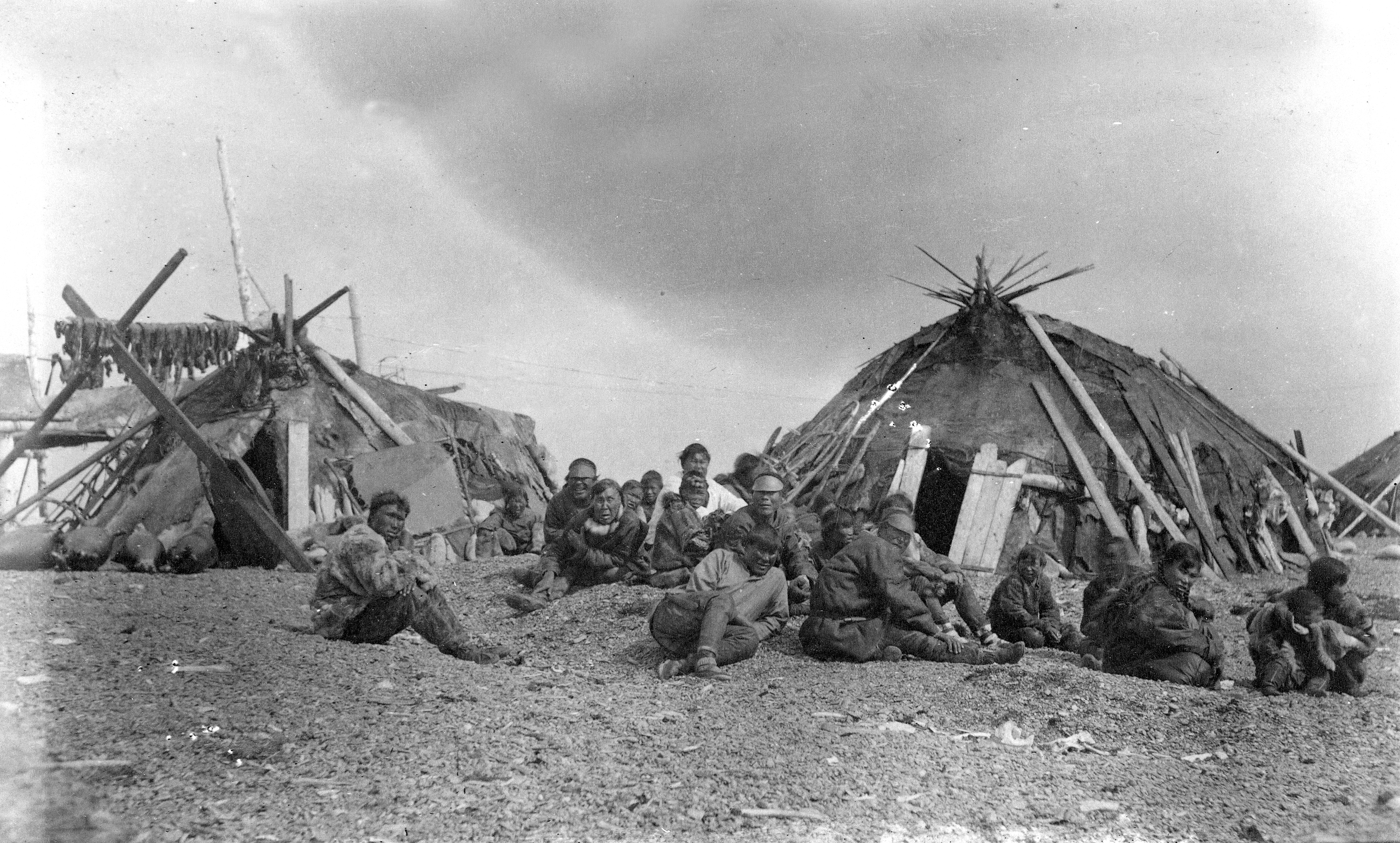
Yupik natives of East Cape Village, Siberia, Russia photographed in 1885 in front of two houses. The houses appear similar to Chukchi yarangas. A rack with, probably drying fur skins (foxes), is at left. On the right side of the left tent a stretched seal skin. The tents also covered with hides.

A yaranga (Chukchi: яраӈы, yarangy) is a tent-like traditional mobile home of some nomadic Northern indigenous peoples of Russia, such as the Chukchi, Koryak, Even and Siberian Yupik.

A yaranga is a cone-shaped or rounded reindeer-hide tent. It is built of a light wooden frame covered with reindeer skins or canvas sewn together.

The word yaranga comes from the Chukchi word for house: jaraŋə (Cyrillic: яраӈы). In Russian use, the terms chum, yurt and yaranga may be used interchangeably.

== Chauchu Chukchi ==
It is built of a light wooden frame covered with reindeer skins sewn together. A medium-size yaranga requires about 50 skins.

A large yaranga is hard to completely heat up. There is a smaller cabin called a polog built inside it, that can be kept warm and cozy.

== Siberian Yupik and Anqallyt Chukchi ==
The most numerous of the Siberian Yupik peoples, the Chaplino Eskimos (Ungazigmit) had a round, dome-shaped building for winter. Literature refers to it as a "yaranga", the same term which the Chukchi people use, but the term used in the Chaplino Eskimos' language is mengteghaq (IPA [mɨŋtˈtɨʁaq], extended Cyrillic: мыӈтыӷаӄ). Its framework was made of posts. Tarpaulins were used for covering the framework. The yaranga was surrounded by sod or planking around the base. There was a smaller cabin within the yaranga at the rear, used for sleeping and living. It was separated from the outer, cooler parts of the yaranga with haired reindeer skins and grass, supported by a cage-like framework. In the language of Chaplino Eskimos, it was called [aːɣra], a word borrowed from the Chukchi language. Household duties were done in the larger outer room of the yaranga in front of this inner building. In winter storms, and also at night, the dogs were there. This room for economical purposes was called [naˈtɨk].

There were also other types of buildings among Chaplino Eskimos: [aːwχtaq] was a modernized type, and [pəˈlʲ̥uk] was used for summer.

Anqallyt Chukchi yarangas were similar to the Chauchu Chukchi yarangas, but:

- Anqallyt yarangas were covered with walrus or seal hides instead of reindeer hides.
- Anqallyt yarangas were stationary or semi-permanent.
- Anqallyt yarangas had a similar layout of the chottagin compared to Chauchu yarangas, but they relied more on whale or walrus blubber lamps instead of open hearths.

== See also ==
- Tipi
- Lavvu
