= Naukan Yupik language =

Eskimo–Aleut language spoken in Russia

Naukan Yupik
- Нывуӄаӷмистун; Nuvuqaghmiistun
- Native to: Russian Federation
- Region: Bering Strait region (or Chukchi Peninsula)
- Ethnicity: 450 Naukan people (2010)
- Native speakers: 60, 13% of ethnic population (2010)
- Language family: Eskaleut: Eskimo; Yupik; Naukan Yupik
- Early forms: Proto-Eskimo–Aleut: Proto-Eskimo; Proto-Yupik
- Writing system: Cyrillic

Official status
- Official language in: Russia: Chukotka (in Chukchi Peninsula)

Language codes
- ISO 639-3: ynk
- Glottolog: nauk1242
- ELP: Naukan Yupik
- Naukan Yupik settlements (magenta dots)

- Naukan Yupik is classified as Critically Endangered by the UNESCO Atlas of the World's Languages in Danger.

Naukan Yupik language or Naukan Siberian Yupik language (Naukan Yupik: Нывуӄаӷмистун, romanized: Nuvuqaghmiistun) is a critically endangered Eskaleut language spoken by c. 70 Naukan persons (нывуӄаӷмит) on the Chukotka peninsula. It is one of the four Yupik languages, along with Central Siberian Yupik, Central Alaskan Yup'ik and Pacific Gulf Yupik.

Linguistically, it is intermediate between Central Siberian Yupik and Central Alaskan Yup'ik.

== Morphology ==
Chart example of the oblique case:

Case	singular	dual	plural
Locative	mi	ɣni	ni
Abl. / Instr.	məɣ	ɣnəɣ	nəɣ
Allative	mun	ɣnun	nun
Vialis	kun	ɣkun	təkun
Aequalis	tun	ɣtun	tətun

The non-possessed endings in the chart may cause a base-final 'weak' ʀ to drop with compensatory gemination in Inu. Initial m reflects the singular relative marker. The forms with initial n (k or t) are combined to produce possessed oblique with the corresponding absolutive endings in the 3rd person case but with variants of the relative endings for the other persons.

In proto-Eskimo, *ŋ was often dropped within morphemes except when next to *ə. *ŋ is also dropped under productive velar dropping (the dropping of ɣ, ʀ, and ŋ between single vowels), and *ana becomes ii in these areas.

== Numerals ==
ataasiq	1	aghvinelek	6	atghanelek	11	akimiaq ataasimeng	16
maalghut	2	maalghugneng aghvinelek	7	maalghugneng atghanelek	12	akimiaq maalghugneng	17
pingayut	3	pingayuneng aghvinelek	8	pingayuneng atghanelek	13	akimiaq pingayuneng	18
sitamat	4	qulngughutngilnguq	9	akimiaghutngilnguq	14	yuinaghutngilnguq	19
tallimat	5	qulmeng	10	akimiaq	15	yuinaq	20
