= Yupʼik clothing =

Traditional clothing worn by the Yup'ik people of Alaska

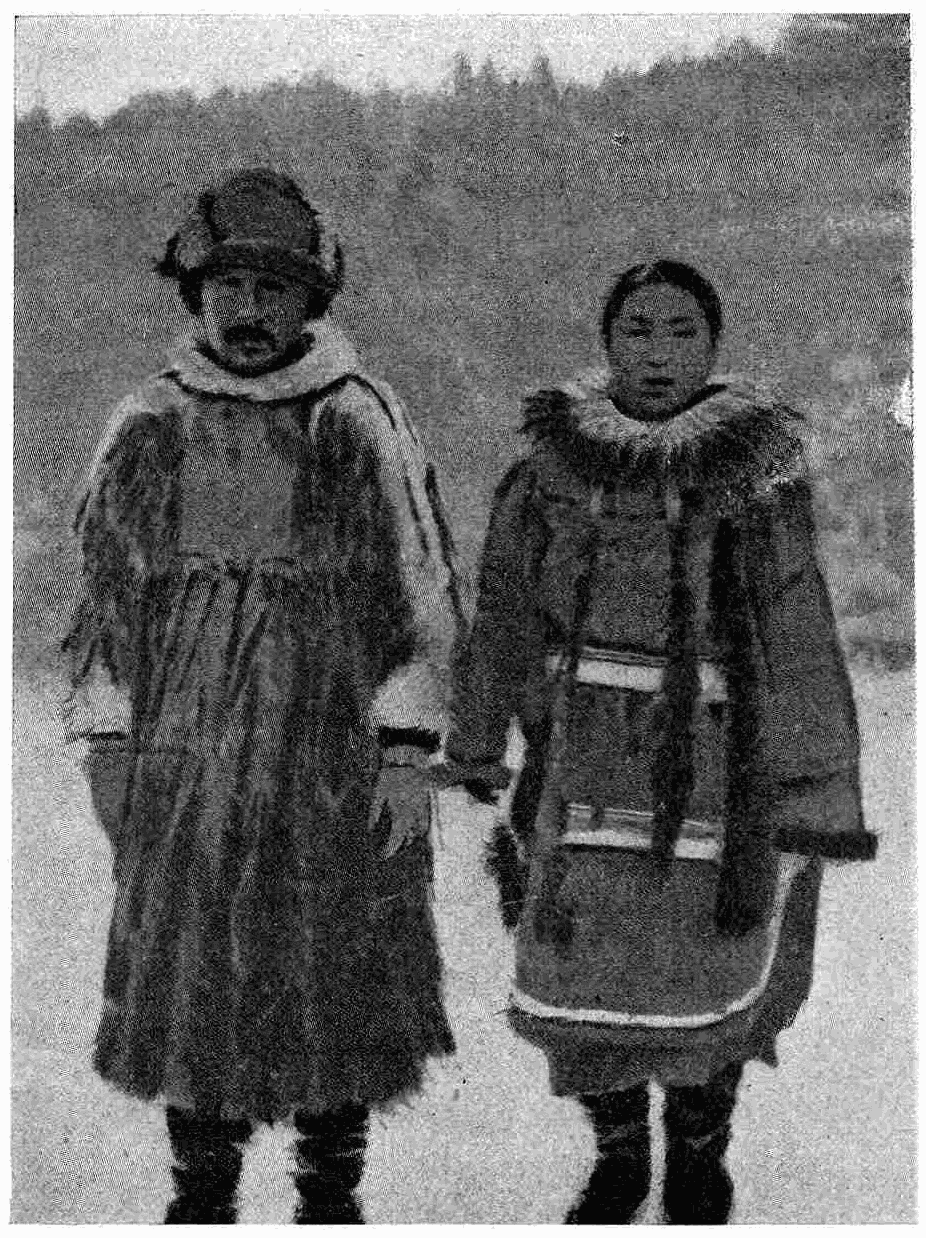
Kusquqvagmiut (Kuskokwim Yup'ik) man and woman wearing hoodless fancy fur parkas (atkupiak), circa 1879

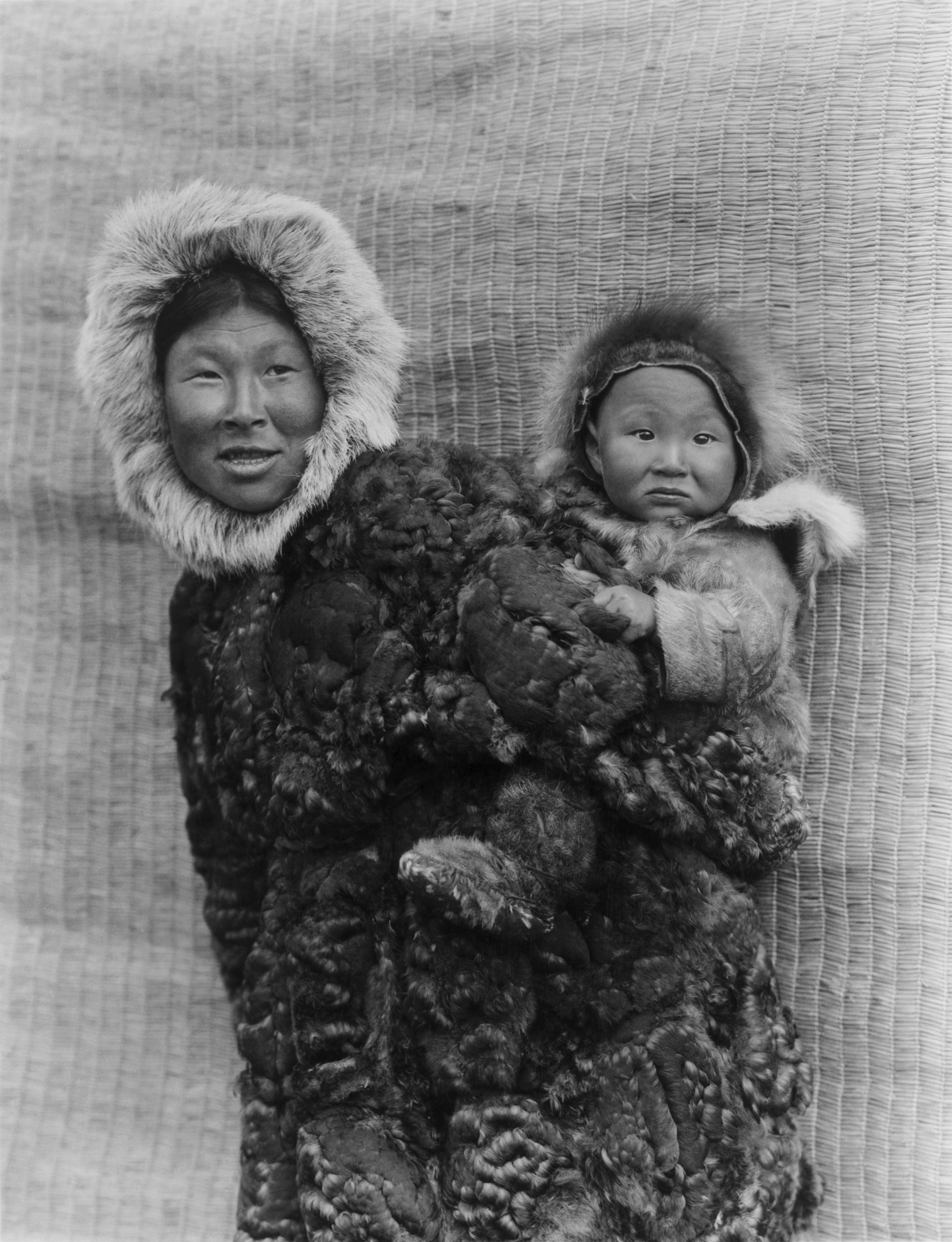
Nunivaarmiut (Nunivak Cup'ig) mother and child (Joe Moses) wearing hooded simple fur parkas (atkuuk), photograph by Edward Curtis, 1930

Yup'ik clothing (Yup'ik aturaq sg aturak dual aturat pl, aklu, akluq, un’u; also, piluguk in Unaliq-Pastuliq dialect, aklu, cangssagar, un’u in Nunivak dialect, Cup'ik clothing for the Chevak Cup'ik-speaking people of Chevak and Cup'ig clothing for the Nunivak Cup'ig-speaking people of Nunivak Island) refers to the traditional Alaska Native-style clothing worn by the Yupik people of southwestern Alaska.

The traditional clothing systems developed and used by the Yup’ik, Inuit and Nuniwarmiut peoples performs similarly to the most effective cold weather clothing developed to date. Yup'ik women made clothes and footwear from animal skins (especially hide and fur of marine and land mammals for fur clothing, sometimes birds, also fish), sewn together using needles made from animal bones, walrus ivory, and bird bones such as the front part of a crane's foot and threads made from other animal products, such as sinew. The multi-functional ulu (semilunar woman's knife) is used to process and cut skins for clothing and footwear. Women made most clothing of caribou (wild caribou Rangifer tarandus granti and domestic reindeer Rangifer tarandus tarandus) and sealskin. Yup’ik clothing tended to fit relatively loosely.

Wastefulness being disrespectful, Yup'ik elders made use of every last scrap from hunts and harvests: seal guts, skins of salmon fish, dried grasses such as Leymus mollis (coarse seashore grass). Traditionally, skins of birds, fish, and marine mammals such as seal and walrus, and land mammals were used to make clothing. Hunting clothes were designed to be insulated and waterproof. Fish skin and marine mammal intestines (guts) were used for waterproof shells (as gut parka) and boots. Dried grass was used to make insulating socks, and as a waterproof thread.

In the Yup'ik culture, parkas are much more than necessary tools for survival in the cold climate of Alaska; they are also pieces of art that tell stories about the past. Many story knife (yaaruin) stories of the storytelling dictated the story of the traditional Yup'ik clothing, such as atkupiaq or fancy parka.

The Russian fur traders or promyshlennikis of the Russian-American Company during the Russian America encouraged the Eskimos to adopt Western-style dress in order to release more furs for trading.

The English word kuspuk adapted from the Yup'ik word qaspeq (a lightweight parka cover or overshirt worn by both Yup'ik and Iñupiaq women and men). Also, the word mukluk (Yu’pik/Inuit boot, a soft knee-high boot of seal or caribou skin) which is derived from the Yup'ik word maklak meaning bearded seal (Erignathus barbatus). That the word maklak has been borrowed into English as mukluk as the name for Inuit/Yu’pik skin boots (kamguk, kameksak, piluguk, etc., in Yup’ik), probably because bearded-seal skin is used for the soles of skin boots. The village of Kotlik derives its Yup’ik name Qerrulliik (dual form of qerrullik "a pair of pants, trousers"), from its location, where the Yukon River splits apart nearby like the legs on a pair of trousers.

Kass’artarnek aturanek sap’akinek-llu atulang’ermeng cali Yupiit nutem atutukaitnek aturaqluteng, . . .
"Even though they do wear Euro-American clothing and footwear, they still use original Yup’ik clothing, . . ."

— Qipnermiut Tegganrita Egmirtellrit (The Legacy of the Kipnuk Elders) 1998

== Eskimo clothing ==
Both Yup'ik (and Siberian Yupik) and Iñupiat clothing are also known as Eskimo clothing in Alaska.

Clothing details differs between northwestern Iñupiaq and southwestern Yup'ik Eskimo clothes. Also, among the Yup'ik regional or socioterritorial groups (their native names will generally be found ending in -miut postbase which signifies "inhabitants of ..."), like those of north Alaska, were differentiated by territory, speech patterns, clothing details, annual cycles, and ceremonial life. Four basic designs are used for women's fancy parkas among the Yup'ik, with some regional variations, including one style adopted from Iñupiaq skin sewers.

Native peoples have flourished in the extreme cold of the Arctic for millennia. Arctic people living throughout the circumpolar region have time-tested their caribou (or reindeer) skin clothing ensembles for 3000 to 8000 years. During that time, their clothing has evolved, so that today they are able to live comfortably within the region, in spite of the bitter weather.

== Bodywear ==
=== Parka ===
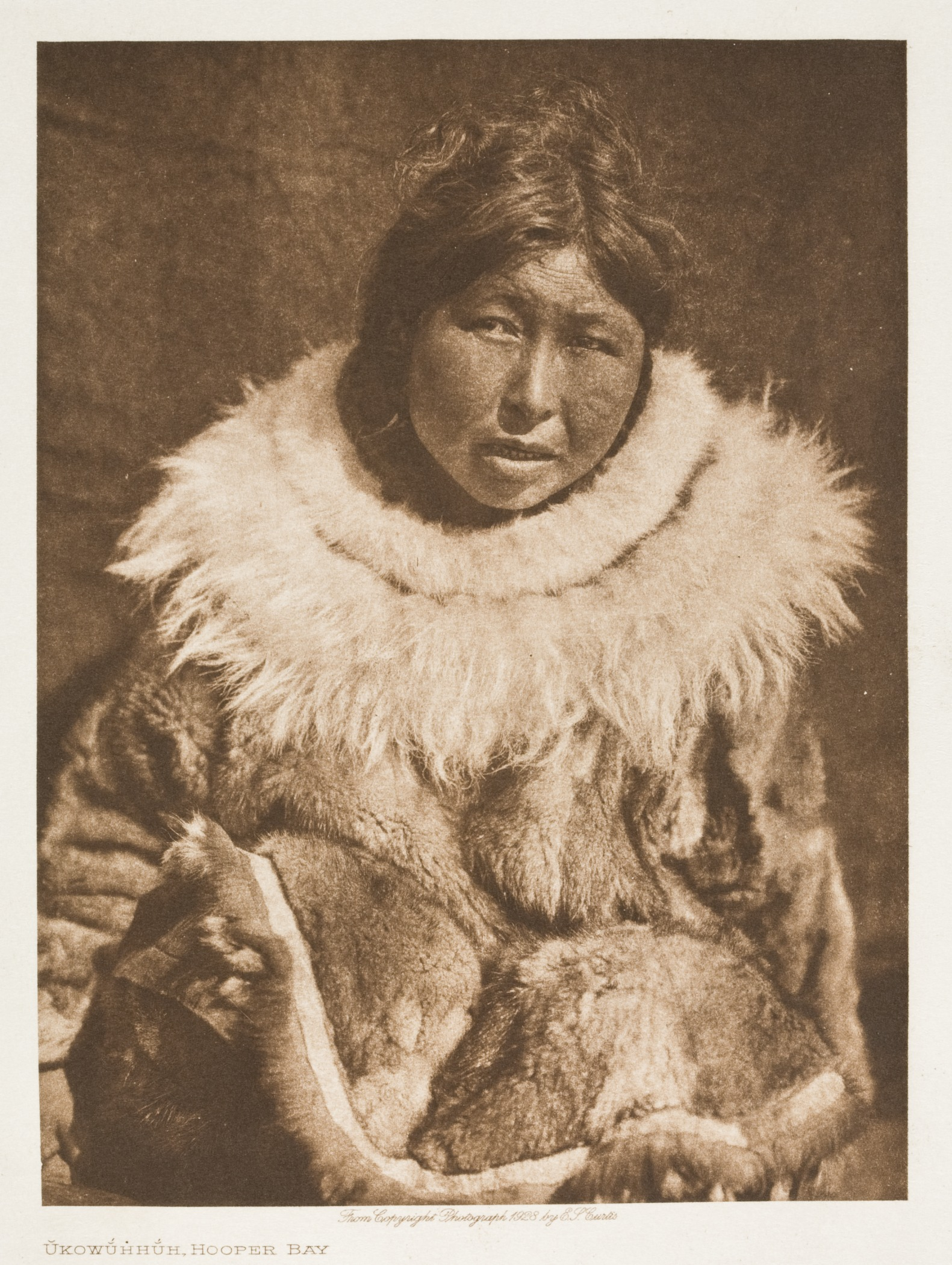
A Hooper Bay woman with hoodless parka in a 1928 photograph by Edward S Curtis

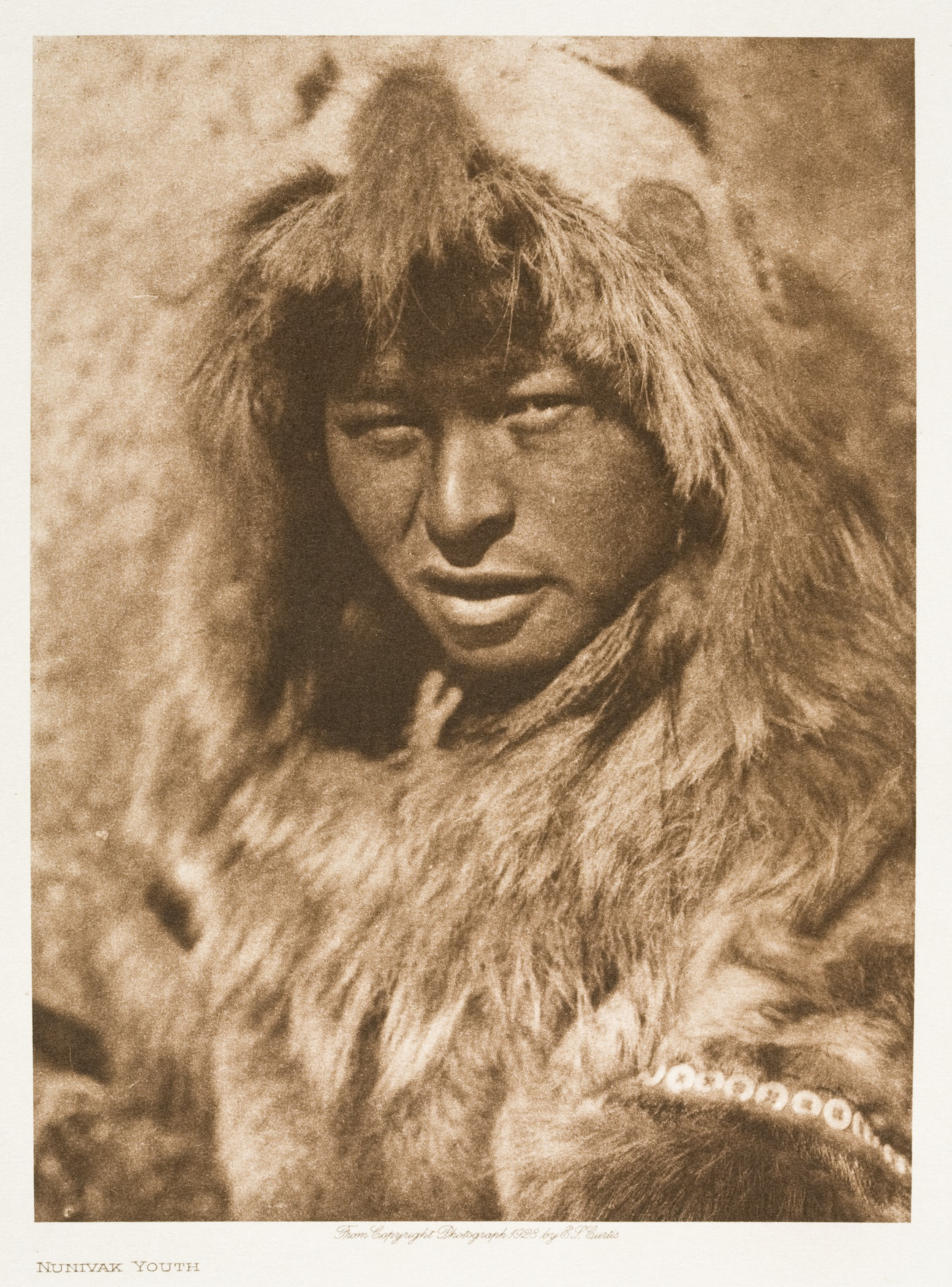
Nunivak Cup'ig boy, photograph by Edward Curtis, 1928

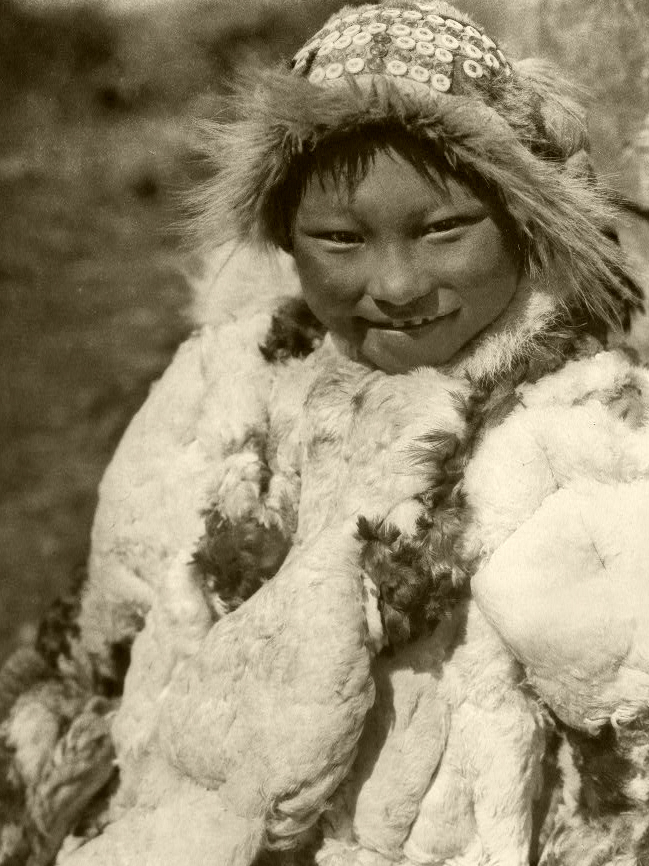
Nunivak Cup'ig child with snowshoe rabbit or tundra hare fur, or possibly a feathered bird skin parka, and wood knot-like beaded circular cap (uivqurraq), photograph by Edward Curtis, 1930

Parka (atkuk sg atkuuk dual atkuut pl in Yukon-Kuskokwim, Bristol Bay and Hooper Bay-Chevak dialects, atekuk in Unaliq-Pastuliq dialect, atkug in Nunivak dialect) is the most common Yup'ik clothing. Parkas were made from a wide variety of materials including reindeer, squirrel, muskrat, bird, and fish skins, as well as intestines. Yup'ik men from the Yukon Kuskokwim area wore knee-length (or longer) hooded parkas with straight hemlines. Women wore slightly shorter parkas with U-shaped front and back flaps.

The researchers had previously shown that there were differences in parka design between Akulmiut (in the present-day tundra villagers of Nunapitchuk, Kasigluk, and Atmautluak), the coast (Caninermiut), lower Kuskokwim (Kusquqvagmiut) and lower Yukon (Pastulirmiut, Kuigpagmiut) river areas, and natives could identify villages that shared a design. The Akulmiut woman's parka typically featured a design along the bodice or culuksugun (also known as culuksuk; hanging decoration on a parka; spine, backbone) or qemirrlugun (piece of calfskin in the middle of a traditional Yup’ik parka with three tassels hanging from it, often having a “drawn bow and arrow” or a fish-tail design stitched on it; smaller plate below the large front and back plates on parka) which represented the tail of an Alaska blackfish (Dallia pectoralis). Occasionally the blackfish tail design in the early part of the 20th century was seen on women's parkas of the Nelson Island people (Qaluyaarmiut) and lower Kuskokwim but were never seen, as one elder woman reported, for example, on parkas of Hooper Bay (Naparyaarmiut) or Chevak (Qissunarmiut) women.

Another Akulmiut design, less commonly used, was the "bow and arrow" design. The parkas of lower Kuskokwim women were also distinguished by the use of the "pretend drums" (cauyaryuak) design across the bust or the qaliq part of the parka. Men's parkas were distinguished as well by the pattern but did not have the decoration detail of the women's parkas.

Women's parkas in the Yukon River area were longer than men's, with rounded hems and side splits that reached almost to the waist. Farther south along the Kuskokwim River, parkas of both sexes extended to the ankles and were usually hoodless, requiring that a separate fur cap or hood be worn. Kuskokwim styles of parka decoration were far more elaborate.

A characteristic feature of Yup'ik parkas was elaboration of the ruff on the hood framing the face, on the cuffs, and, in recent times, the border around the bottom of the garment.

Sleeve (aliq sg aliik dual aliit pl in Yup'ik and Cup'ik, amraq in Egegik Yup'ik, alir in Cup'ig) is the part of a garment that covers the arm.

Parka ruff (negiliq, atkuum negilia, asguruaq in Yup'ik, legiliq, ayguruaq in Cup'ik, amraq in Egegik Yup'ik;, ulganaqin Cup'ig, but negili in Cup'ig, as means "edge of hood where ruff is attached; edge of kuspuk hood; halo around the sun") is parka's ruff, but not Western style ruff collar. The kumegneq is parka ruff edging near the face. Yup'iks use wolverine skins for parka ruffs.

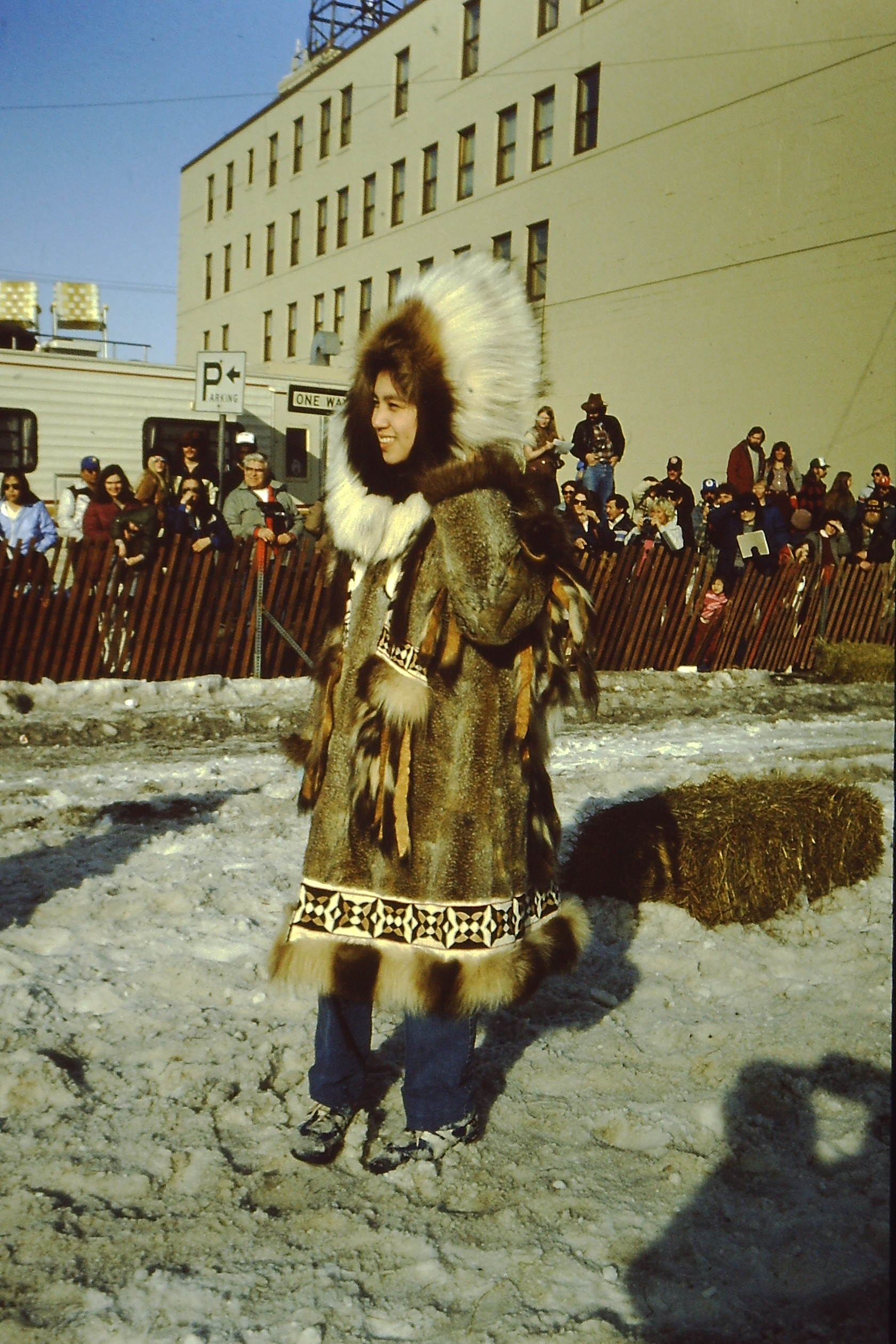
A modern fancy parka (atkupiaq) with trim at hem (akurun). Fur market in Fairbanks, between 1980 and 1983

Fancy parka (atkupiaq sg atkupiak dual atkupiat pl, literally "real parka, genuine parka") is a fur parka made of ground squirrel, muskrat or mink pelts with traditional fancy decorations (such as one style that has a band across the chest area and eight tassels hanging front and back). The tassels, it is said, represent fingers. Among the Yup'ik, traditional style women's parkas are still made and worn on festive occasions. Men's fancy parkas are no longer made, although a few elders still recall their forms and decoration. The atkupiaq is the most popular type of woman's parka among the Yup'ik living along the Kuskokwim River and in the Kuskokwim Bay area. This parka is very long by comparison with Canadian Inuit parkas, with an even lower edge. The border is decorated with a geometric design of black and white pieces of calfskin. On older parkas, the border was lined with a band of calfskin with fine decorative stitching, symbolizing footprints on snow. The hood with its beautiful ruff is much smaller than on a Canadian Inuit woman's amauti, and there is no pouch for carrying a baby. Some elements (certain stitches, tassels, specific strips of fur, beads and shapes of hide) on a parka represent specific parts of an historic story. Fancy parka a very important component of Yup'ik culture. An atkupiaq is a signifier that tells a story to Yup'ik wievers, much like the robes worn by Alaska Natives of the Northwest Coast (as Eyak, Tlingit, Haida, Tsimshian). Traditional Yup'ik oral stories (qulirat and qanemcit) were embedded in many social functions of the society. Storyknifing (yaaruilta literally "let's go story knife!") stories a traditional and still common activity of young girls and are told by children of all ages in Yup’ik-speaking Eskimo villages in Alaska. These stories are illustrated by figures sketched on mud or snow with a ceremonial knife, known as story knife or story telling knife (yaaruin sg yaaruitek dual yaaruitet pl in Yup'ik, saaruin in Yukon dialect). Stories were told through the use of the yaaruin, the story knife by the women and young girls and most importantly stories were found within the traditionally Yup’ik clothing. The women had to pass this knowledge on to their daughters so that the clothes would reveal the correct story of the family and the men had to recognize these stories on the clothing. In the past, dressing in fine fancy clothing was reserved for ceremonial events like festivals in the qasgiq, when animals and spirits (yua) were honored. The tradition of the fancy parka continues there today.

Ilairutaq or Yukon-style parka (ilairutaq in Yup'ik) is a type of traditional Yup’ik parka of a design said to be borrowed from the northern Malimiut Inupiaq people via the Yukon area.

Qulitaq or Kuskokwim-style parka (qulitaq in Yup'ik) is a type of traditional Yup’ik parka with two pieces of calfskin on the back (called by the same name as the parka design), and two calfskin pieces on the chest (called cauyak) worn in the coastal (Canineq?) areas.

Qaliq or tundra (Akula)-style parka (qaliq in Yup'ik) is a type of traditional Yup’ik fancy parka worn by Qaluyaarmiut (Nelson Island Yup'iks) and Akulmiut (tundra-area Yup'iks) that has large front and back plates of white calfskin or of mink skin, also the plates of calfskin. But, the Chevak Cup'ik meaning is seal-gut rain parka used with a kayak.

Qaliluk (qaliluk sg qaliluuk dual qaliluut pl in Yup'ik, qalilurrlugar in Cup'ig) is man's hoodless caribou-skin or reindeer-skin parka.

Squirrel-skin parka (uulungiiq in Yup'ik) is a parka decorated with a fringe of squirrel bellies (uulungak).

Other Nunivaarmiut Cup'ig parkas are kinguqaleg (woman's fur parka cut high on the sides so that there are front and back flaps), qatrin (white camouflaged parka), qutngug (sealskin parka), and ellangrat (parka made of strips of bleached sealskin and gut or fishskin) or langrat (vertical design or designs made from fish skin on a parka).

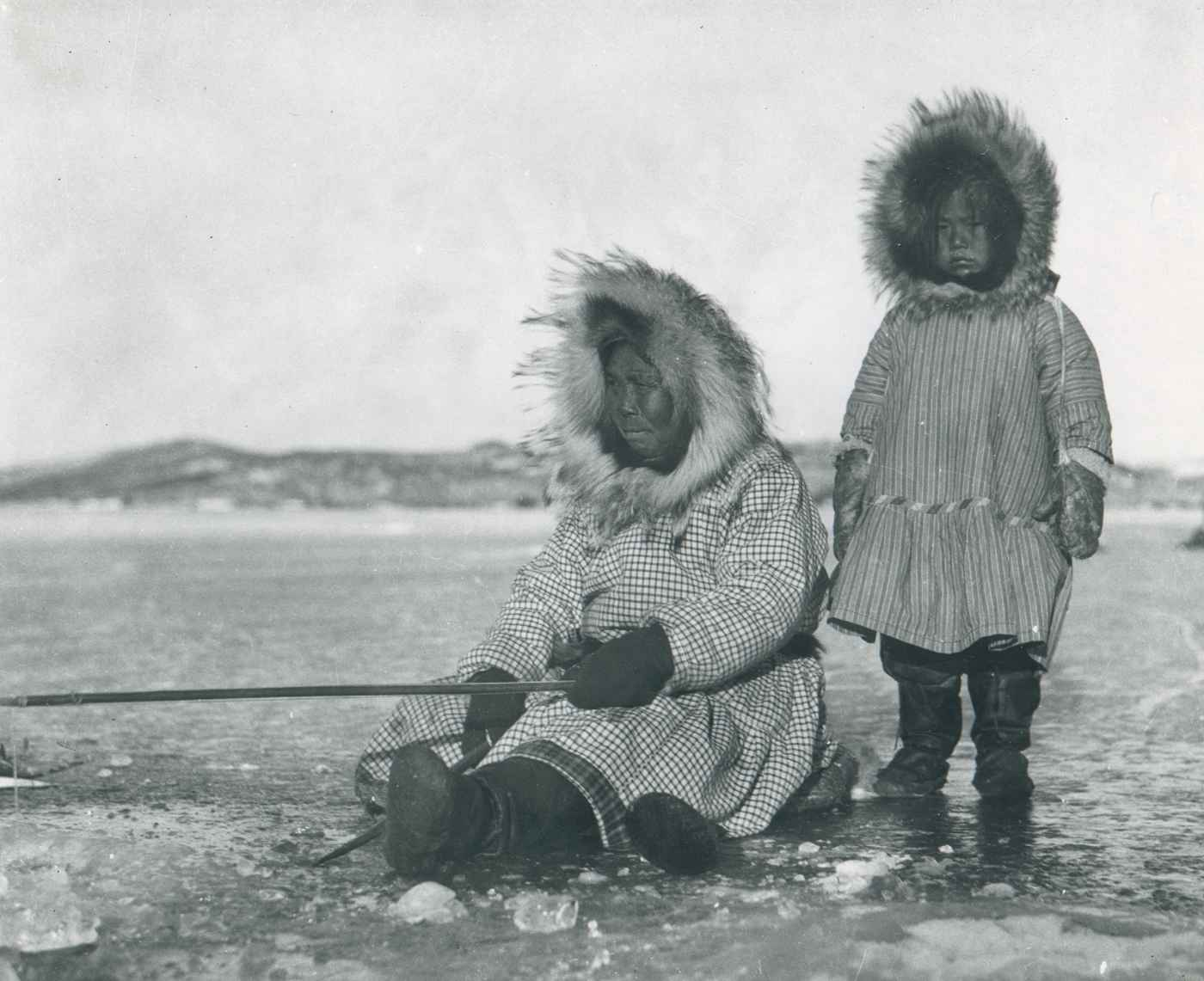
Kuspuk worn by Eskimo woman and girl ice fishing

Parka cover or Kuspuk (qaspeq in Yup'ik and Cup'ik, qasper in Cup'ig) is a traditional Yup'ik garment, worn in both casual and formal settings in Alaska. It is worn by both men and women, but men usually wear a kuspuk only for ceremonial such as Eskimo dancing (yuraq) or formal occasions, while for women it is common casual clothing, even among non-Yup'iks. The kuspuk is, in essence, a long-sleeved overshirt with a hood. Trim, often rickrack, edges the hood, sleeves, and the single large pocket in the front. A typical kuspuk for women has a print (usually floral), whereas a man's is a solid color. Female versions also may include a skirt of varying length (making the garment more technically a dress rather than a top), or may have no skirt at all. Traditional Yup'ik style kuspuks vary widely among villages. Colloquially, the skirted version is called Kuskokwim style kuspuk, while the skirtless type is called Yukon style kuspuk. The name of a school district (Kuspuk School District offices are located in Aniak) is derived from kuspuk.

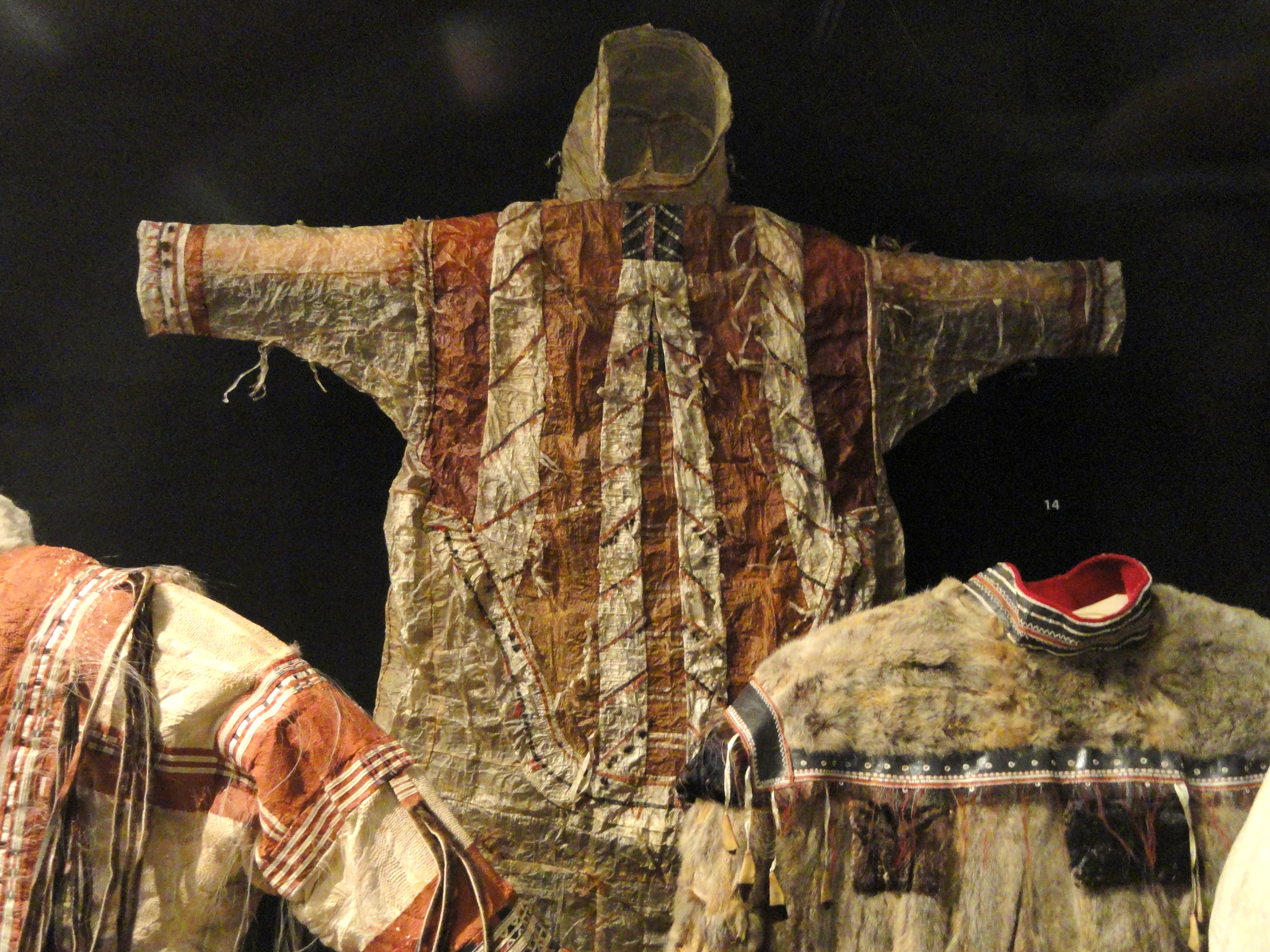
Yupik Eskimo gut parka kamleika (kamliikaq). Exhibit in the Arvid Adolf Etholén collection, Museum of Cultures (Kulttuurien museo) of National Museum of Finland, Helsinki, Finland.

Gut parka or gutskin parka, gut rain parka, seal-gut raincoat (imarnin sg imarnitek dual imarnitet pl in Yup'ik and Cup'ik, imarniteg dual in Cup'ig) is a hooded waterproof gut raincoat made from seal intestines (gut) of a single bearded seal, with a wide hem made to fit snugly over the kayak's cockpit coaming were ideal outer garments for wet weather and ocean travel in the kayak. Gut parkas are constructed using the intestines of sea mammals or bear and are worn in kayaks, tide pool collecting, dance and celebration. Embellishment of Yup'ik gut parkas used wolverine, bear, wolf, musk ox, dog hair, human hair, cormorant and murre feathers, eagle down, auklet feather and mandibles. Blown gut requires only a short time to dry, but environmental conditions will alter dramatically the color and flexibility of the final product. Gut will become opaque and white when prepared in the most extreme conditions of cold, darkness and wind and this product is often referred to as "winter gut", and by some by the inaccurate term "bleached". The more yellow, non-flexible gut is prepared in less severe weather conditions and is called "summer gut". The gut parka (raincoat) was and still is the most effective against wet weather, and was once prized by the Russian occupants as overall the best protection against the elements. The Russians called traditional Aleut gut parkas kamleikas (this word has been borrowed into Yup'ik as kamliikaq from Russian) and that word has been used as a general word for any gut parka.

Fish skin parka (qasperrluk in Yup'ik; derived from qaspeq "parka cover kuspuk" and the postbase -rrluk "N that has departed from its natural state (often, though not always, with an undesirable connotation)", amirag in Cup'ig) is a kind of fish-skin clothing (amiragglugaq) also that could serve as a tent. Fish skin parkas in the past were worn by both men and women when hunting and traveling. In winter they were worn over a fur parka just as cloth covers have been in more recent times. A Yukon fish skin parka made of dog salmon (Oncorhynchus keta) skin. Nunivaarmiut men wore parkas made of silver salmon (Oncorhynchus kisutch) skin, while those of women were made of salmon trout (charr) (Salvelinus malma) skin and often had a white fox ruff on the hood. The Nunivaarmiut Cup'ig did not prepare their own fish skins for parkas, but bought them, already prepared, from Yup'ik people on the Yukon and Kuskokwim rivers. These imported skins had been stretched, smoke-dried, and scaled.

Bird skin parka (tamacenaq in Yup'ik) made from skins of birds of the Alcidae, Anatidae, Gaviidae, and Laridae families. Bird skins make very good and warm parkas. Thick bird skin parkas were ideal winter wear but were also used during cold weather in summer. Yupik (Yup'ik, Siberian Yupik, Sugpiaq ~ Alutiiq) and Inuit (Inupiaq) Eskimo seamstresses had regional variations in bird skin preparation techniques and bird skin parka styles and bird skin clothing-production techniques. Bird skin parkas are rarely made today and the skill is quickly disappearing among skin sewers in their region. During the 19th century, many Yup'iks along the coast between the Yukon and Kuskokwim rivers wore bird skins. Every year, one could afford to make a bird skin parka because birds returned in such abundance. A plump Yup'ik baby trussed up in eider skin smiled from a warm, dry, cushioned world.

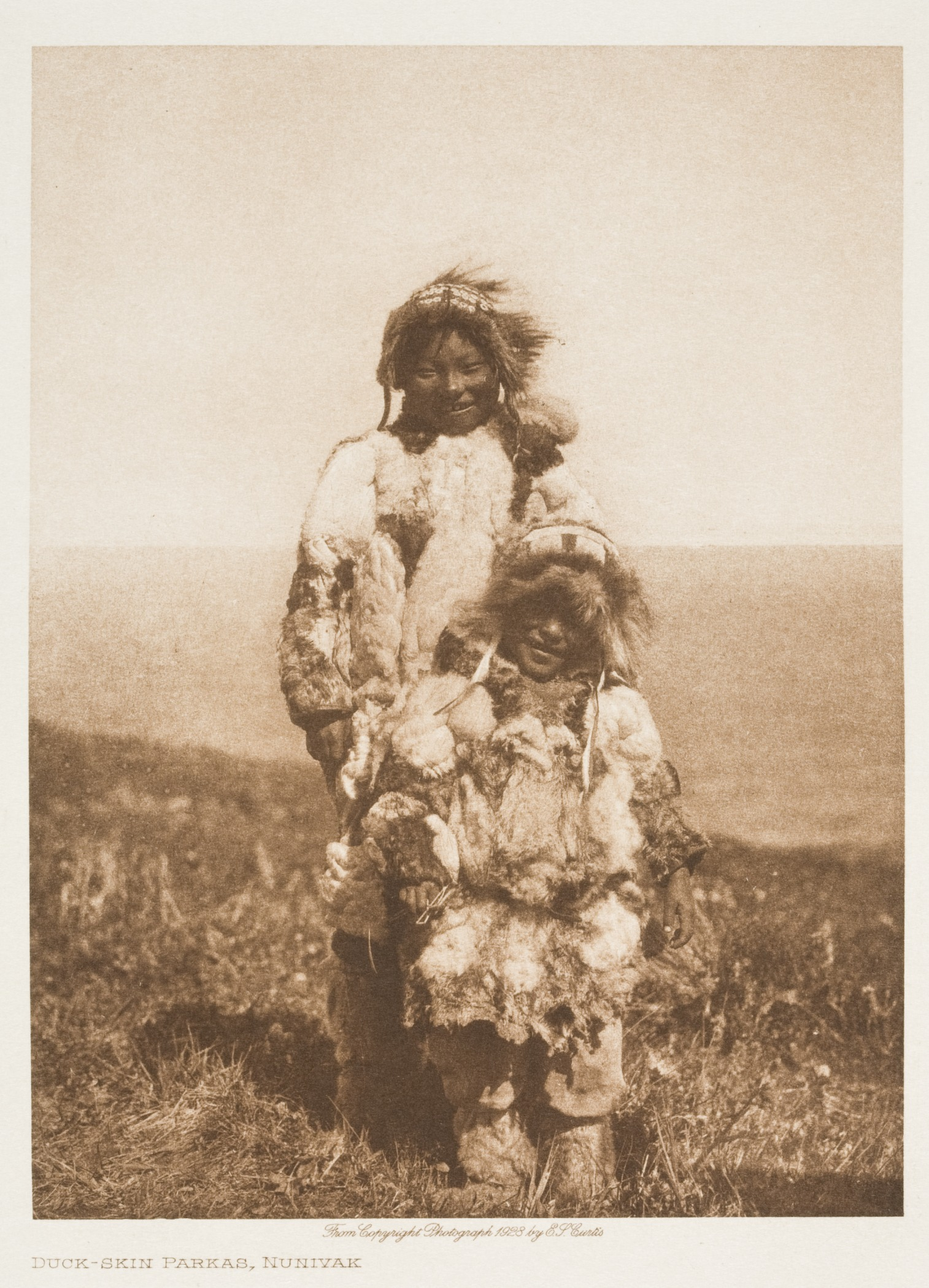
Two Nunivak Cup'ig children wearing circular caps (uivqurraq) and duck-skin parkas (probably aarraangiarat) in 1928 photograph by Edward S Curtis.

Nunivaarmiut Cup'ig bird skin and feather parkas are alpacurrlugar (murre skin and feather parka) made from Uria aalge skin with feathers, cigurat atkut (guillemot skin and feather parka) made from Cepphus columba skin with feathers, alpacurrlugar (auklet skin and feather parka) made from the white part of the Aethia cristatella skin with feathers, qilangar (puffin skin and feather parka) made from Fratercula corniculata skin with feathers, aarraangiarat (oldsquaw skin and feather parka) made from Clangula hyemalis skin with feathers, metrar (eider skin and feather parka) made from Somateria mollissima skin with feathers, tengaurtet (kittiwake skin and feather parka) made from Rissa tridactyla skin with feathers (used as camouflage for sliding over the ice to sneak up on game). In the Nunivak, seabirds, particularly murres, nest in numbers, the natives paying annual visits to the nesting grounds to secure skins of puffins, murres and others for clothing. The bird skins most commonly used for clothing were those of the cormorant (Phalacrocorax pelagicus), common or Pacific eider (Somateria mollissima), king eider (Somateria mollissima), Steller's eider (Polysticta stelleri), common murre (Uria aalge), horned puffin (Fratercula corniculata). Cormorant and eider were considered more valuable and gave more prestige to the owner. Bird skin parkas are light and comfortable to wear but tear easily. Such parkas were usually reversible, worn with the feathers next to the body in winter with a cloth garment over the parka to cover the rough, yet fragile, skin side. At night the parka was turned and slept in or used as a blanket with the feathers on the outside. Bird skin parkas were shaped like those made of animal skin, but because of the great thickness of the feathers and the general bulk, they did not have fur strips, beading, and other decoration. Cuffs and bottom borders tended to be plain except on murre parkas. Tufted puffin skins were counted and sold in "knots" or bundles of six. Thirty-four skins were necessary for a man's parka and 28 for a woman's. The common puffin is smaller, so six knots and four extra skins were required for a man's parka, five knots and four extra for a woman's. Puffins are found only along the cliffs near Nash Harbor, and residents of Mekoryuk had to trade for them with those living in the settlement there. Sufficient puffins for a parka could be obtained in exchange for one bearded seal skin. Parkas made of cormorant skins were worn only by women. The skins of these birds are larger than those of murres and puffins. When murre skins were prepared for parka use, they were roughly square in shape and included the breast and the sides. Two narrow black backs were sewn together to form the crown of the hood.

=== Pants ===
Trousers or Pants (qerrulliik dual qerrulliit pl or ulruk dual [Bristol :Bay, Egegik] in Yup'ik and Cup'ik, qerrullig dual in Cup'ig) used from sealskin or fur. Traditionally, fur trousers are worn by men and women, although today more and more Yup'ik wear pants made of woven materials. The big pants (qerrulligpiik ~ qerrulviik or ulrurpiik dual in Yup'ik) and short pants (qerrulcuarag in Cup'ig, also means panties) are usable. Knee-length pants were worn under parkas. The crotch of pants or body (amlek sg amelgek dual in Yup'ik).

The name of Kotlik village (is a federally recognized tribe and Pastulirmiut residents are Calista Corporation shareholders) derives its Yup’ik name Qerrulliik (dual form of qerrullik "a pair of pants, trousers"), from its location, where the Yukon River splits apart nearby like the legs on a pair of trousers.

Summer pants (atasuak ~ atayuak dual in Yup'ik).

Trouser-boots (allirtet pl [Unaliq-Pastuliq] in Yup'ik) is pants with attached socks made of fur. Women wore trouser-boots, each one made from a single small harbor seal skin with the seam running down the front of the leg. Each boot, longer on the outer (hip) side, was tied to the belt. Very short trousers made from a single small sealskin were also worn. A man's sealskin pants required two skins, and was not hemmed at the bottom. At the top the skin was turned under and stitched. Braided sinew was run through the hem to serve as a belt. Narrow strips of sealskin were sewn on a man's pants at the waist in front and in the seam of a woman's trouser-boots as fringe or tassel decoration.

Belt (nungirta ~ nungirun in Yup'ik and Cup'ik, nungirta in Cup'ig). Belts were held in place with a fastener.

== Headwear ==
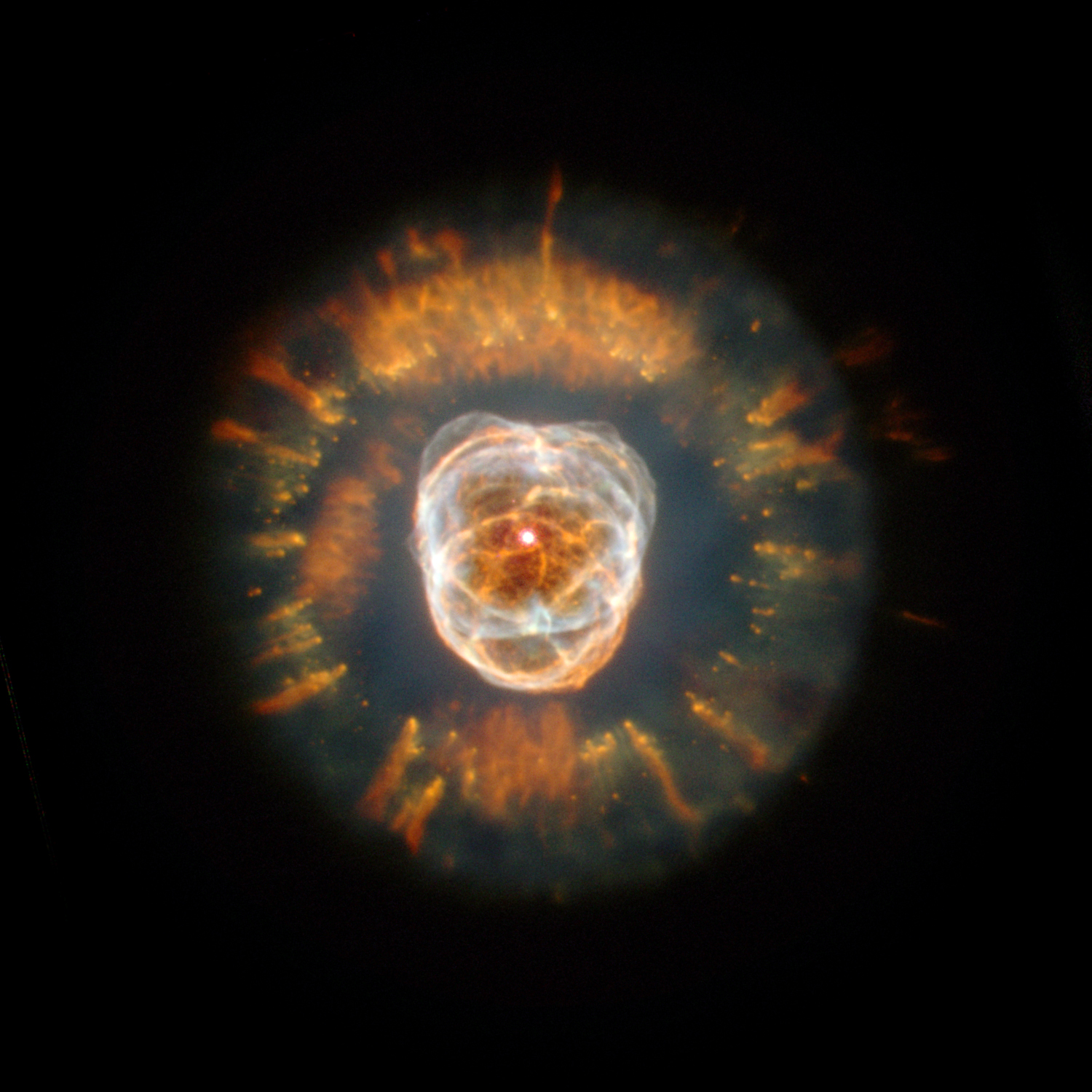
The formation of the Eskimo Nebula is like an Eskimo parka hood ruff with a face.

Hood or Parka hood (nacaq, uqurrsuk in Yup'ik, nacar in Cup'ig) is a common hat on the parka. The Greenlandic Inuit (Kalaallit, Tunumiit, and Inughuit), the Canadian Inuit, and the Alaskan Iñupiat and Yup’ik usually wear a parka style which has an attached hood with a fur ruff to protect the face. These hoods are usually trimmed with an Arctic fox tail, or a broad strip of wolf or wolverine fur. The tengqucuk is a tip of parka hood; the kak’acuk is a pompon on tip of parka hood or hat; the kakauyaq is a decoration at the crown of the hood of a young woman's traditional Yup’ik parka that consists of strands of red, black, and, white beads or strips of calfskin; the menglairun is a strip of fur between the ruff and hood of a parka. The formation of the Eskimo Nebula resembles a person's head surrounded by a parka hood. The emperor goose's Yup’ik name nacaullek literally means "one having a parka hood".

Separate hood (yuraryaraq in Yup'ik) used with hoodless parka. They used them for traveling when they wore parkas without hoods. These hoods are made of squirrel-skin or strips of dyed fish skin.

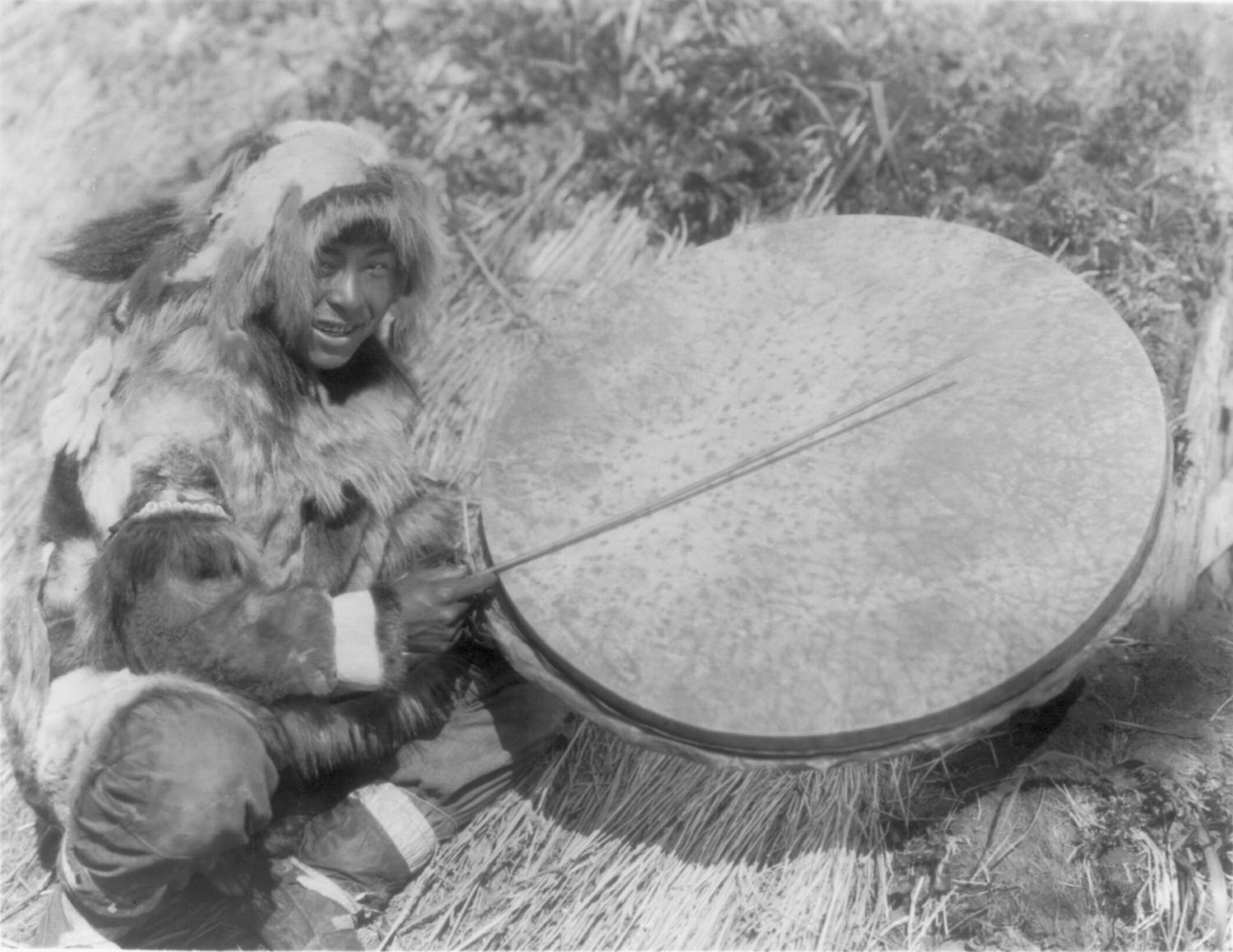
Nunivak Cup’ig man with fancy hat (nacarpig'ar men's dance hat; man's fancy cap with strips of fur hanging on shoulders) playing a very large drum (cauyar) in a 1927 photograph by Edward S Curtis

Hood ruff (negiliq in Yup'ik and Cup'ik, negili in Cup'ig) is not similar neck ruff. Both men's and women's parka hoods were finished with a large hood cover, known as "sunshine ruff" or "sunburst ruff" made from strips of wolverine and fox. The sunshine ruff is made to resemble the rays of the sun beaming from one's face. The ruff on a fancy parka was constructed of not merely one or two layers of fur but of three or four of different tints and thicknesses. The yurturuaq is a small dark piece of fur at the very top of light-colored garment hood ruff (said to represent a black bear sitting on a mountain of snow) or small light piece of fur on dark-colored garment hood ruff (said to represent a polar bear).

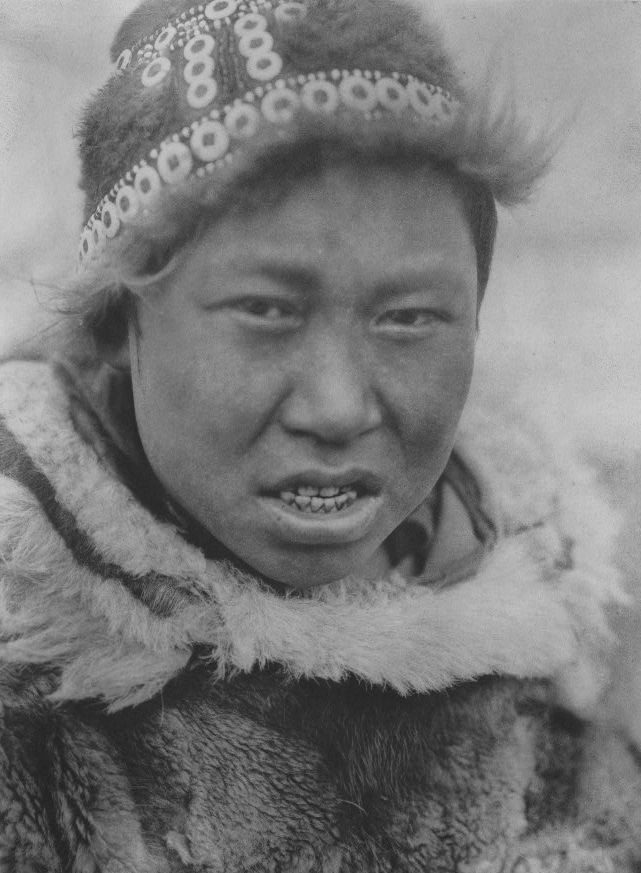
Hooper Bay Askinarmiut boy poses wearing a circular cap (uivqurraq) and fur parka, in 1930 photograph by Edward S Curtis.

Fancy hat (nacarpiaq in Yup'ik, literally "real hat", nacarpig'ar in Cup'ig) a Yup'ik men's ceremonial headdress (angutet nacait "men's hats") with strips of fur hanging on shoulders or a drummer's hood traditionally used for opening ceremonies and dances. The nacarpiaq is made from bird feet leather, glass and crystal beads, cultured pearls and the skins and furs of wild animals like the mink, land otter, wolf and wolverine. The Yup’ik use animal hide because they believe animals sacrifice themselves in order for the wearer of the garment to survive. Nunivaarmiut Cup'ig men wore caps with many strips of fur hanging from the bottom edge over the neck and shoulders. The main body of these caps, worn at dances, was usually made of squirrel skins with a crown and borders of white reindeer fawn skin. Sometimes a wolverine tail was fastened on the back, and the long bottom fringe might be of reindeer skin strips. Nunivaarmiut Cup'ig wolf head caps, which consisted of an entire head skin including ears and nose, were also worn at ceremonies. Edward S. Curtis (1930) mentions animal-head caps worn during the Messenger Feast.

Circular cap or circular hat (uivqurraq or uivquq in Yup'ik) is cap of squirrel or other skin with wood knot-like (uivquq "knot in wood, a mark left in timber by the origin of branches") beaded decorative bands. People wore circular caps like this in regions south of the Yukon River, where parkas were made without hoods.

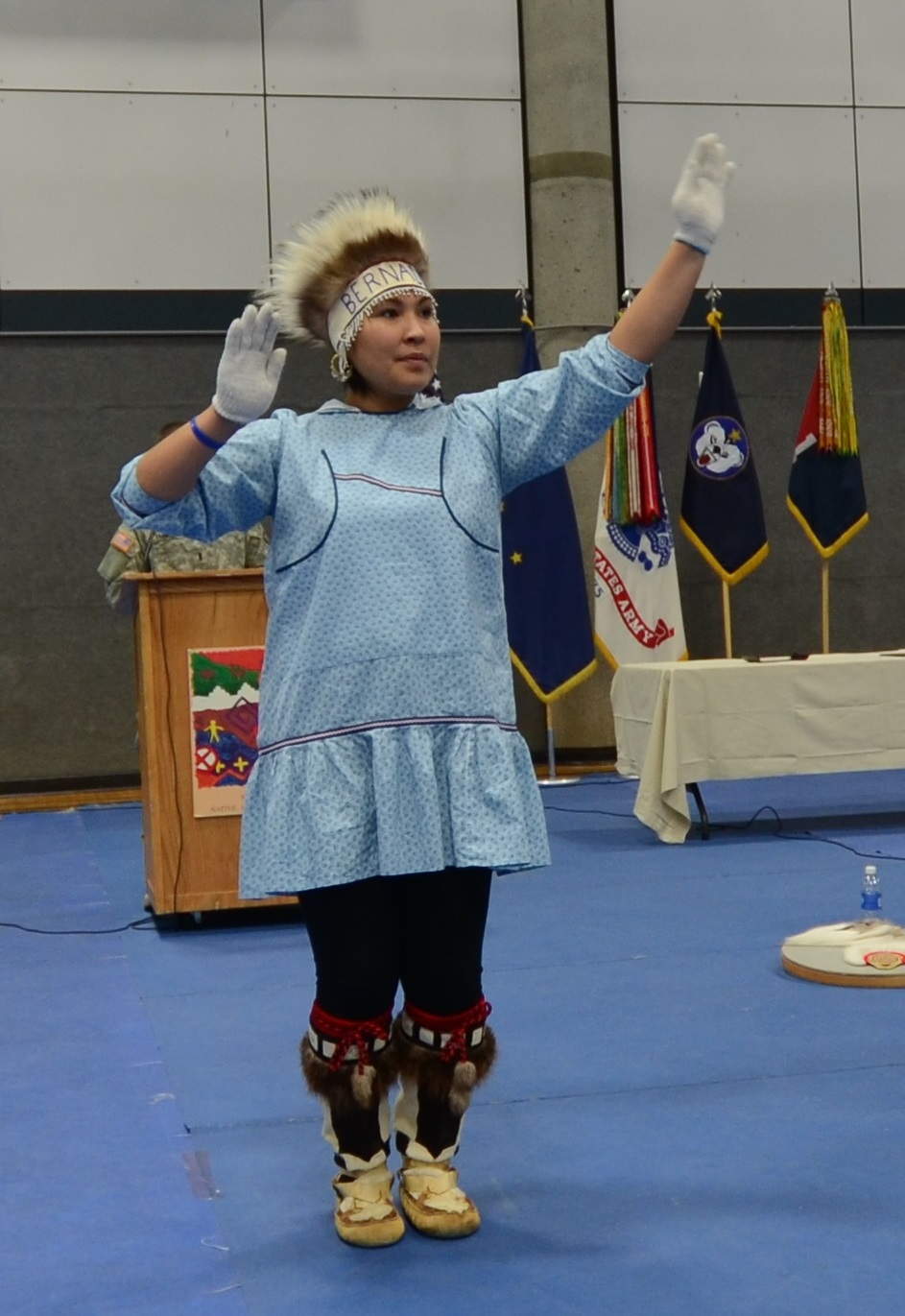
Yup'ik dancer from Inu-Yupiaq dance group performing in a kuspuk, dance headdress (nasqurrun), and mukluk

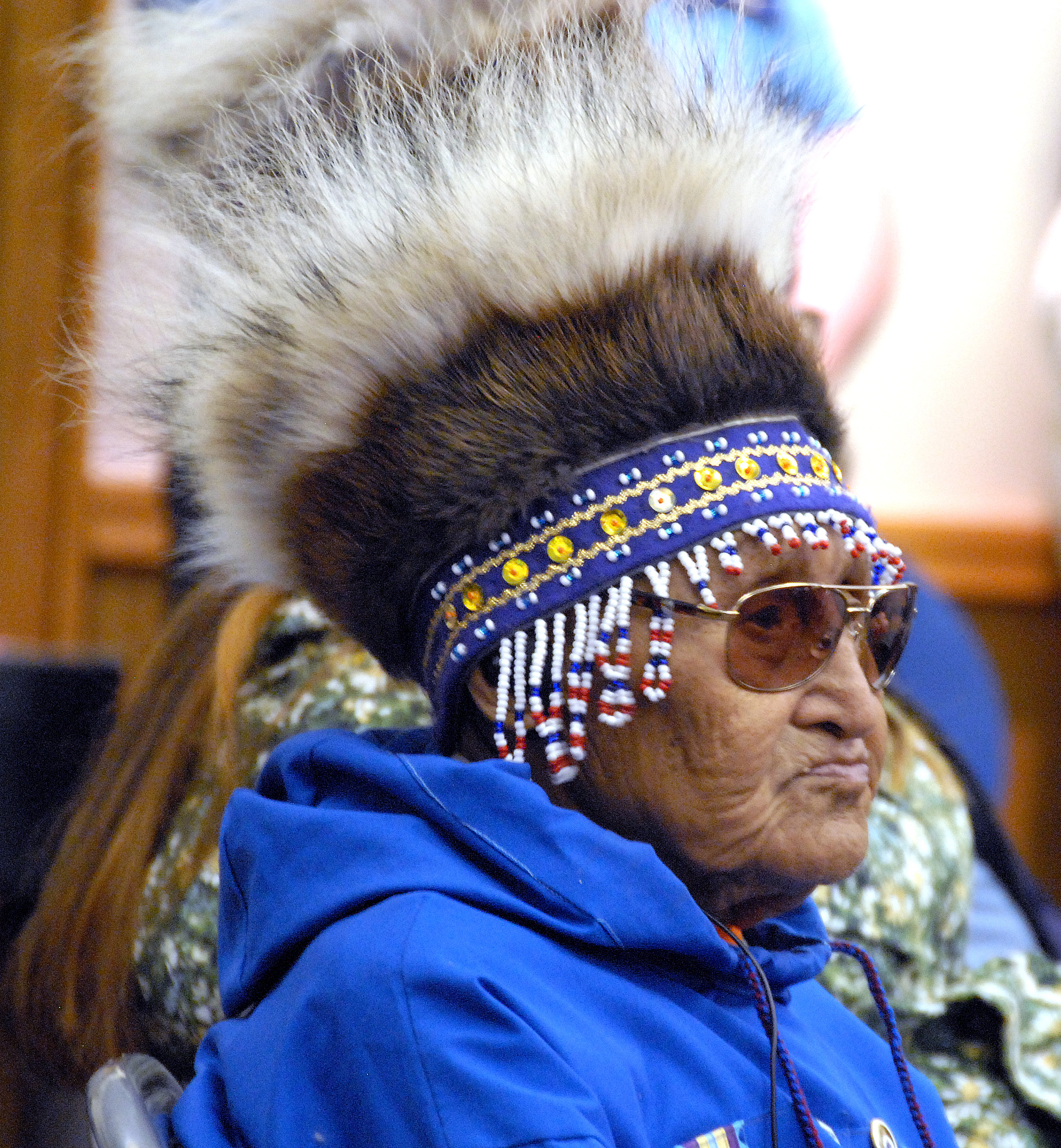
A dance headdress (nasqurrun), 2009

Crown-like dance headdress or dance hat (nasqurrun sg nasqurrutek dual nasqurrutet pl in Yup'ik and Cup'ik, nasqerrun in Cup'ig; which is derived from the nasquq "head; the person who starts the Kevgiq") a beaded and wolf, wolverine, weasel, otter, ermine fur-ruffed, also bear clawed or caribou-haired dance headdress used for Eskimo dancing. In coastal villages of the Yukon-Kuskokwim Delta, men who led ceremonial "asking songs" during Kevgiq (Messenger Feast), wore caribou-hair headdresses like this one. They directed the drumming and singing with feathered enirarautet (pointing sticks or dance sticks). Women wore similar headdresses, which remain a part of modern Yup’ik dance regalia for both sexes. The nasqurrun used to be worn by men at some frequencies. But after Euro-American contact with Alaska, female-only use got codified, and that's pretty much the way it is now.

Knit cap-like dance headdress or dance cap, dance hat (nacarrluk in Yup'ik, literally "bad hat") is a beaded headdress worn by young girls to keep their caarrluk (dust and scent) from injuring others. Girls always wore those beaded hats, even though they weren't dancing.

Steambath cap or feather sweatbath cap, firebath hat (maqissuun in Yup'ik and Cup'ik, maqissun in Cup'ig) is a headgear worn in steambath (maqivik) or other gear used in sweatbath. While taking a sweat bath, men protected their heads with a crude cap of puffin, eider duck, or murre skins. The top of the cap was made from one whole skin split down the middle of the breast. The wings, with bones removed, were left on and stuck out at the sides. Half skins were sewn around each side.

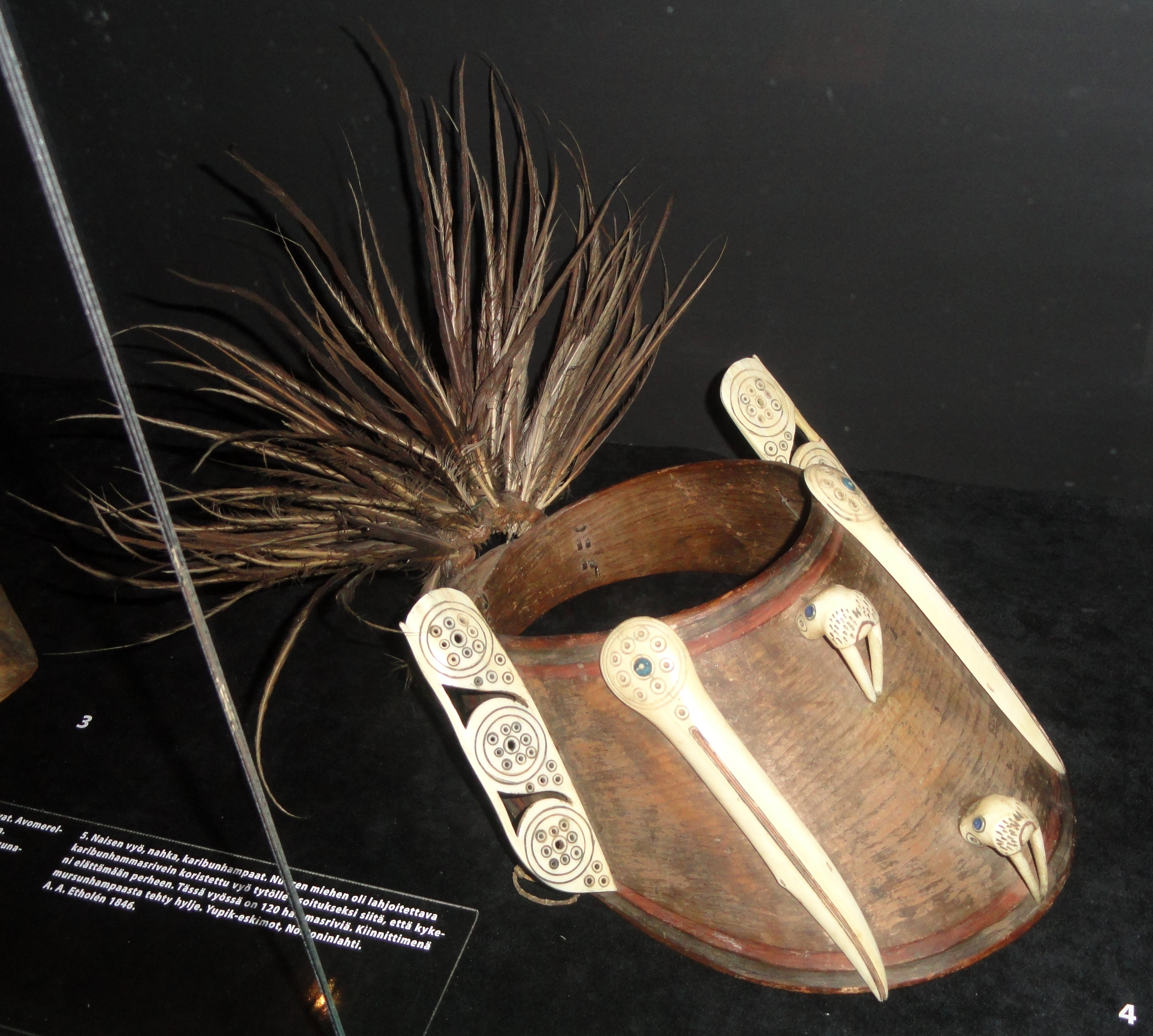
Yup'ik semi-conical bentwood hunting visor (elqiaq) with walrus ivory and feather decoration. Exhibit in the Arvid Adolf Etholén collection, Museum of Cultures (Kulttuurien museo) of National Museum of Finland, Helsinki, Finland.

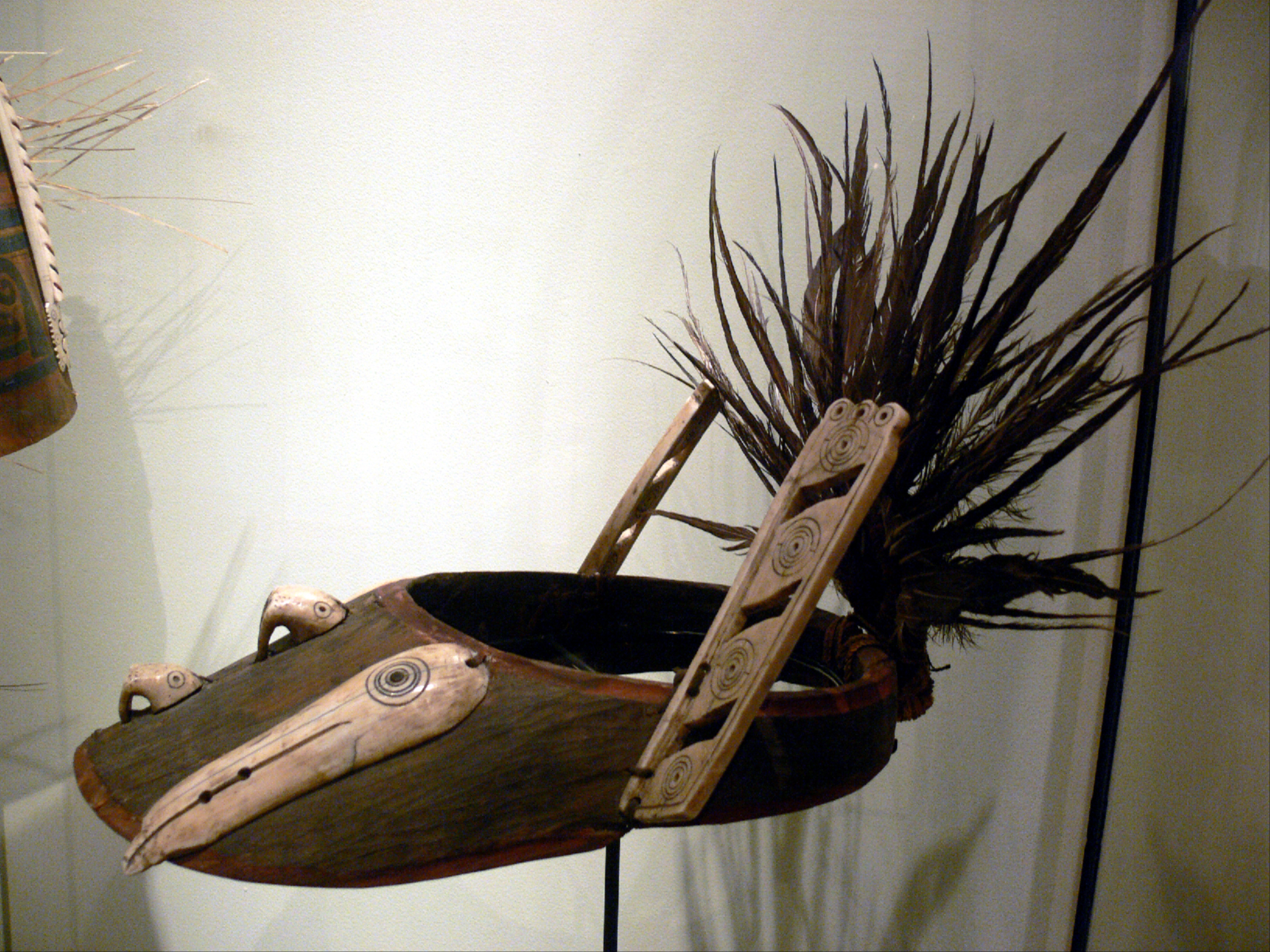
Yup'ik semi-conical bentwood hunting visor (elqiaq) with walrus ivory and feather decoration. Ethnological Museum of Berlin.

Full-conical closed hunting hat or bentwood hat, bentwood helmet, conical wooden hat, conical hat (ugtarcuun, ugtarcurcuun in Yup'ik; derived from ugtaq "seal on an ice floe or shore") is shaped like a pointed piece of ice. Bentwood hunting hats helped to conceal the seal hunter as he floated in a white kayak among the broken spring floes. A wooden hunting hat shaded a man's eyes against waves, spray, and glare. This conical bentwood hat was worn by men when hunting seals amid floating sea ice during spring seal hunting and during the Bladder Festival (Nakaciuryaraq), when the souls of seals are returned to the sea.

Semi-conical open hunting hat or bentwood visor, wooden visor, hunting visor (elqiaq, ciayaq in Yup'ik and Cup'ik, elqiar, caguyag in Cup'ig, also caguyaq in Sugpiaq ~ Alutiiq, originally borrowed from Aleut ~ Unangan chagudax̂ (Eastern) chaxudax̂ (Western) during the Russian America era) is semi-conical shaped bentwood men's hunting hat decorated with feathers or traditional wooden visor to protect the eyes from the sun's glare, eyeshade. To make a visor a craftsman used hot water to soften the wood, then bent it around and stitched the ends together with sinew, baleen, or split root. Animal carvings were added as hunting charms. Feathers may have been added to assist the transformation of hunters into birds, as described in oral tradition. The pugugyug (in Cup'ig) is design on caguyar, the legcicuar (in Cup'ig, literally "small gaff") is small gaff attached to caguyar.

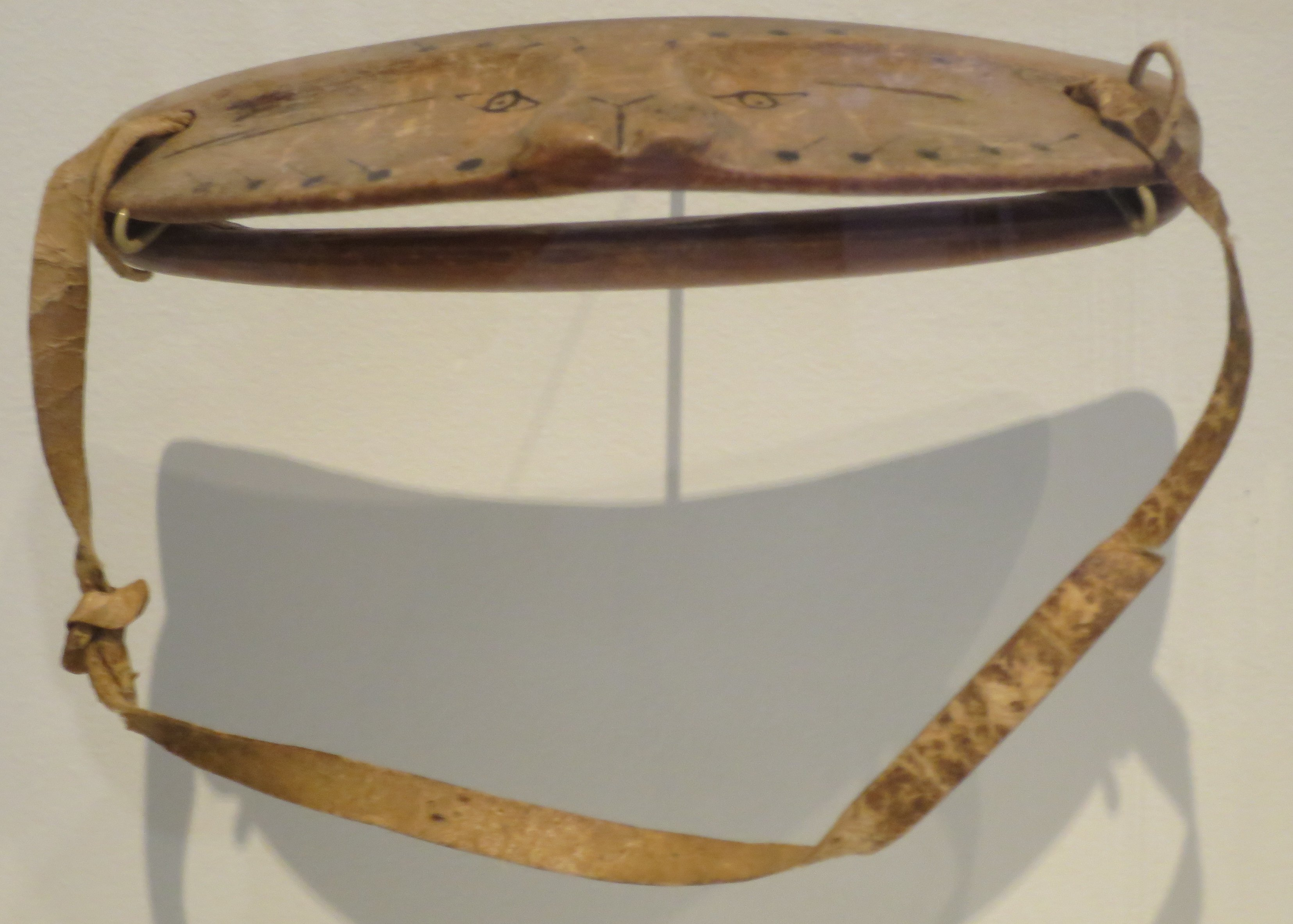
Nunivak Cup’ig wooden snow goggles, Nunivak Island, Alaska, first half of the 20th century, Honolulu Museum of Art

Snow goggles (niguak ~ niiguak dual or nigaugek dual nigauget pl in Yup'ik and Cup'ik, igguag in Cup'ig) are old-style snow goggles made out of wood with narrow slits, which admit only a little light. Snow goggles were carved from driftwood (esp. spruce), walrus ivory, bone or caribou antler, and sometimes made with coarse seashore grass. The inside of goggles are always painted black, to reduce glare so one's eyes can stay wide open. Goggles were created in various styles by artists from different regions, and they often resembled animals underscoring a pervasive Native theme of human-animal transformation. Some snow goggles are carved in the form of an animal mask. Arctic foxes have keen eyesight for hunting on the land and sea ice, a quality that the mask/goggles may have been intended to transfer to the person wearing them. The goggles with narrow slits not only protect the eyes from excess light, but also sharpen and focus vision, like a pinhole camera. Some goggles have large eye openings and are blackened with soot inside to eliminate reflections. Snow goggles are an ancient element of Eskimo hunting cultures, appearing in archaeological sites up to 2000 years old.

== Handwear ==
Glove (aasgaaq, aisgaaq [Yukon], aigsaaq, aigyaaq, aiggsak [Kuskokwim], aggsak [Kuskokwim], aaggsak, aaggsaq, yuaralek in Yup'ik, agyaaq, aiygaaq in Cup'ik, asgar in Cup'ig) were usually made out of caribou or sealskin, sometimes made out of fish skin (especially Pacific salmon) or dried grass. Decorated ceremonial fancy glove is aiggaqtaaq or aaggaqtaaq.

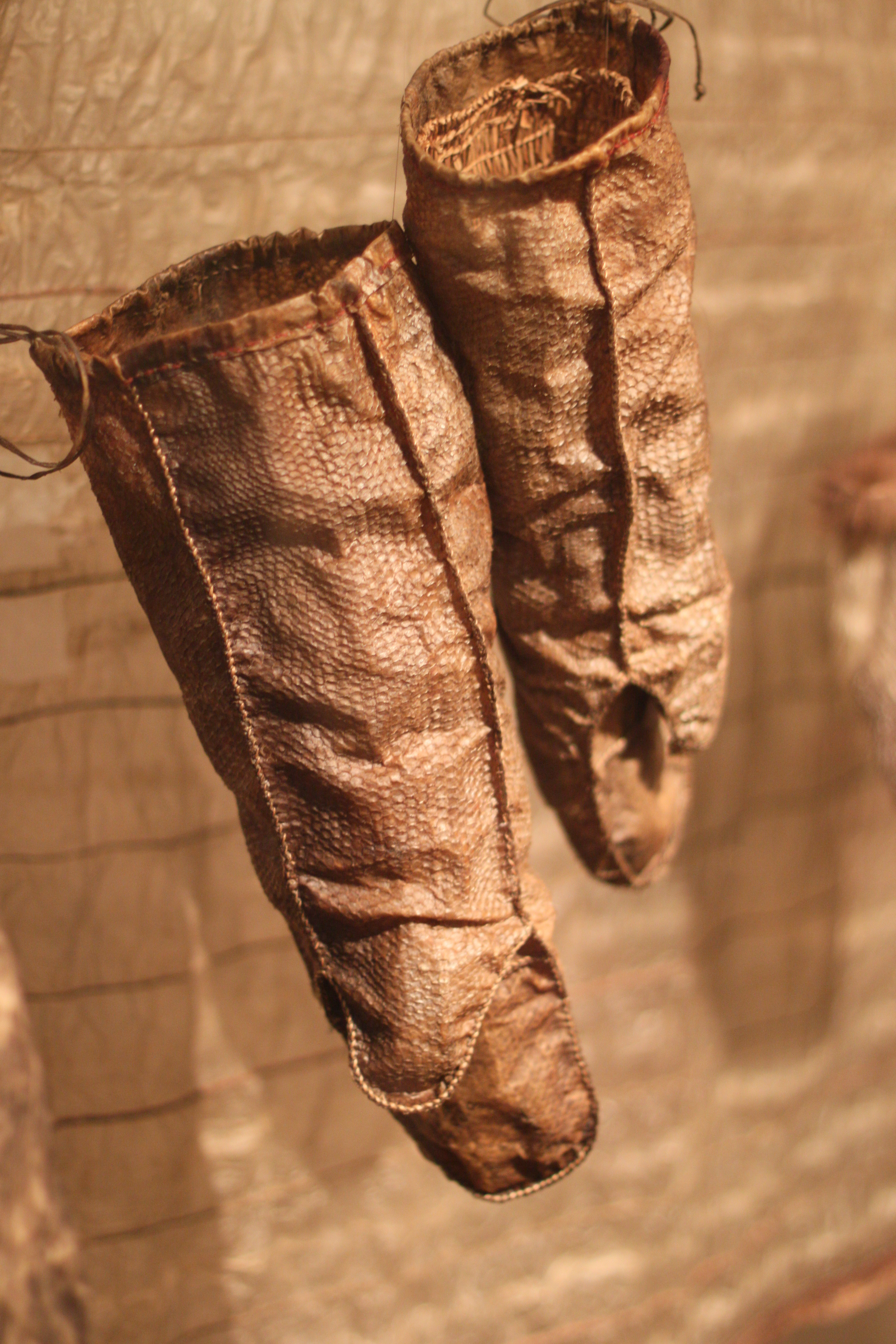
waterproof fish-skin mitten (arilluk)

Mitten (aliiman, aliuman, aritvak, kauman in Yup'ik, aritvag in Cup'ig). Child's mitten of any sort is aritvacuar or aritvacuarar (in Cup'ig). Long waterproof dehaired sealskin or fish-skin (salmon-skin) mitten is (arilluk sg arilluuk dual arilluut pl, arin in Yup'ik, arillugar in Cup'ig). Fish skin mittens with grass liners used for kayak travel during spring in bad weather. Man's short skin mitten used when going on a kayak trip is arikarer (in Cup'ig).

People wore waterproof salmon-skin mittens to keep their hands dry while kayaking, driving a dog sled, or working with fish nets. Woven seashore grass liners went inside for warmth. To prepare the fish skins, they were first soaked in urine, scraped clean, and then hung outside to freeze-dry in cold weather. The last step was to scrape off the scales.

Wrist-length mittens used to be commonly made of seal or caribou skin with the fur and the rough edge of the seam on the outside. Sealskin mittens were frequently made from leftover pieces of skin after boots were cut from them. The back and palm were separate pieces and the thumb one piece; gloves were unknown. Women wore fur mittens reaching nearly to the elbow with wolverine trim along the upper edge. Mittens of silver salmon skins which reached to the elbow were worn by men when hunting in a kayak in spring. The fish were cut down the back and the belly skins used for mittens. These sometimes were lined with grass or had grass mittens, woven all in one piece, inside; often they had a border of bleached sealskin. The combination of fish skin mittens with grass padding was less bulky for paddling than fur mittens. According to Curtis (1930, p. 11), mittens of dehaired sealskin that reached barely to the wrist were also worn by men in the spring.

== Footwear ==
Yup'ik footwear, especially Eskimo skinboots, known as mukluk, like other Eskimo groups, meets the challenge of weather, season, terrain and function with maximum efficiency, comfort and durability.

Sole of boot (alu ~ aluq sg aluk dual alut pl [also means sole of foot] in Yup'ik and Cup'ik, atungar in Cup'ig) is the bottom of a boot, in contact with the ground. The nat'raq (in Yup'ik, nateraq in Unaliq-Pastuliq dialect) a special oversole of skin boot used to prevent slipping on ice. Yup'ik soles are traditionally made of bearded seal skin which is usually chewed to make it moldable. The sealskin materials used for skinboot soles are nat'rarkaq (in Yup'ik) "sole material for skin boots, made from the tanned skin of the bearded seal", atungagkar (in Cup'ig) "sealskin material to be used for making bootsoles", arinacir(ar) (in Cup'ig) "aged sealskin used for skinboot soles or as a mat", meqcirer (in Cup'ig) "sealskin aged to remove hair and stretched on stakes over ground (hide is then used for making boot soles)". Boot soles were occasionally cut from old kayak covers that had been made from bearded seal skins. Siberian Yupik, Alaskan Yup'ik, and Iñupiaq boot soles are particularly thick, sometimes reaching a depth of five centimeters.

Winter boots are made with depilated soles of bearded seal and leg sections of haired ringed or spotted seal. Decorative red yarn is worked into the sole seam around the toe and heel. In the past, boots used for dancing were also used as winter boot. The leg section was made from young caibou-leg skins and the soles were made from depilated skin of bearded seal. Today many dances are held indoors, so some women make the soles of their dance boots with lighter-weight materials such as ringed seal. Moose-leg skins are used when they are available. Commercially tanned calfskin is used by contemporary seamstresses.

Mukluks or Eskimo boots are soft knee-high boot traditionally made of seal (mostly bearded seal) or caribou skin. Alaskan Eskimo mukluks are traditionally made with bearded seal skin soles and leg uppers of caribou trimmed with fur, but Alaskan Athabaskan mukluks are traditionally made of moose hide and trimmed with fur and beadwork. There were various mukluk types of footwear used by Yup'ik Eskimos, including kamguk, kameksak, piluguk, and others. The word mukluk which is derived from the Yup'ik word maklak meaning bearded seal, because bearded seal skin is used for the soles of skin boots. The lower part of caribou's front legs (tuntum iruit) are used to make kameksaq and piluguq for Yup'ik footwear.

Calf-high mukluk (piluguq sg piluguuk dual piluguut pl in Yup'ik; often used in the dual)) is winter calf-high skin boot. It is worn by both men and women, but men's boots are larger than women's. The men's boots don't really have decorations. They only put decorations on women's boots. This boots made of caribou leg skins were sewn using the front of the caribou's back leg on the boot's front and the back of its front leg on the boot's back; this avoided the skin that was worn thin by the animal's habit of kneeling to forage.

Knee-high mukluk (kamguq sg kamguk dual kamgut pl in Yup'ik [Yukon]; often used in the dual) is knee-high or higher skin boot.

Ankle-high mukluk (kameksaq sg kameksiik ~ kameksak dual kameksiit pl in Yup'ik, kameksag dual in Cup'ig; often used in the dual) is ankle-high skin or fur boot, or house slipper.

Fancy mukluk (ciuqalek in Yup'ik) is fancy skin boot made with a piece of dark fur over the shin part (and back part). Nunivaarmiut ac'iqer ciuqaleg (in Cup'ig) is men's fancy skin boot with wolverine in front.

Waterproof mukluks or waterproof boots are, Ivruciq (ivruciq sg ivrucik dual ivruciit pl in Yup'ik and Cup'ik, ivrucir in Cup'ig) is waterproof sealskin boot with fur inside worn by men; At'arrlugaq (at'ayagglugar in Cup'ig [in the Yup'ik Eskimo Dictionary as at'arrlugaq]) is women's thigh-high sealskin waterproof hip boot; Qalluwit (qalluwit in Cup'ig) is high waterproof boots for young; Mamlek (mamlek [Yukon] in Yup'ik) is thigh-high skin boots with fur above the knee and waterproof material below the knee.

Fish-skin boots (amirak ~ amiraq sg amiriik dual in Yup'ik and Cup'ik) are waterproof skin boot made of fish skin. In the past fish-skin boots were made with depilated soles of bearded seal, ankle straps, and a casing sewn to the upper edge of the leg. Large salmon skins were prepared for boots by sewing up the fin holes. A round needle was used because a triangular needle would split the skin.

Other Yupik and Cup'ik skin boots are, atallgaq (ankle-high skin boot), ayagcuun (thigh-high skin boot with fur out, any other item used in traveling), catquk (skin boot made of dyed sealskin), nanilnguaraq [Yukon] (short skin boot), qulip'ak ~ qulip'agaq [Unaliq-Pastuliq] (skin boot with beaver trimming), qaliruaq (ankle-high skin boot for dress wear; also means slipper; sock).

Other Nunivaarmiut Cup'ig skin boots are, at'ar (Eskimo sealskin boot), ac'iqer (men's high skin fur Eskimo-boot), an'giuteg (men's Eskimo winter boots), ilutmurtar (men's boot sealskin for men with fur inside), qamquinar (men's high wading boot), unillugag (women's eskimo boots), yuunin (women's high skin boot), yuunillugar (women's old high skin boot), ac'upegglugar, acupegglugar (women's old high skin boot).

Socks (ilupeqsaq in Yup'ik and Cup'ik, ilupeqsar in Cup'ig) is as liner for boots. Loon skin socks made from the birdskin of loon (Gavia).

Grass socks made from Elymus mollis used to be worn inside sealskin boots. The boots were lined with grass in the bottom and were worn with woven grass socks.

Liner: The fur liner for skin boot (murun or muruqaq, also means slipper in Yup'ik and Cup'ik). The woven liner for skin boot (alliqsak, alliqsaq sg alliqsiik dual in Yup'ik and Cup'ik), made by twining dried grass or burlap fibers, etc.

== Children's clothing ==
Children's clothing (mikelnguut aturait) was made of soft skin of younger animals. Reindeer fawn and dog puppy skin parkas, with the fur inside, were made for babies (irniaq) and small children (mikelnguq). Puppies one and two months old were killed for the purpose. Fawn and puppy skins were turned inside out, scraped, hung out to dry, and then put away. When needed the skins were taken from storage, rubbed between the hands with a rotary motion, and chewed as necessary to soften and loosen tissue that had not previously been removed. For a sealskin parka, one skin was required for a three-year-old, two for a five- or six-year-old, and three for a child of 10 or 12 years. A small child's sealskin parka was often decorated with tassels of the same material stitched to the upper center of the back. A baby's boots were always made with the fur inside but otherwise were similar in construction to adult boots. In former times, babies wore long boots and no pants. When a child was toilet trained, pants separate from boots were put on a boy, while girls were given trouser-boots like those worn by women.

In addition to being addressed as kin by one's namesake's relations, a person Continues a special relationship with these people. As a child, she may receive gifts from them, such as the traditionally complete set of "head to toe" clothing, and frequent invitations to meals.

== Trimming ==
Trim (naqyutkaun in Cup'ig) on parka, hat, and boot is decorative trimming elements such as patchwork pieces or tassel. Parka trim pieces made primarily of white and black skin of caribou or reindeer, also now largely replaced by calfskin. The fur of the wolf and wolverine are utilized by the Alaska Natives for parka trimming. Wolverines have a somewhat higher basal metabolic rate than other animals their size, which means their internal fire burns a little hotter. To help hold in heat, they wear a long, luxuriously thick coat. Trappers prize this fur because the texture of wolverine hair also keeps it from absorbing moisture. Used widely as trim on parka hoods, cuffs and collars, it readily sheds frost that would otherwise build up from steaming breath.

The Yup'ik non-hanging trims on clothing: akurun ~ akut (in Yup'ik) aku (in Cup'ig) trim at hem of parka, often made of pieces of black and white calfskin sewn together in a geometric design; tungunqucuk wide strip of otter fur below the light-colored decoration at the hem or cuff of a traditional Yup’ik parka, or other dark fur trim on a parka; cenliarun trimming on hem of garment; alirun ~ alinrun trim around parka cuff; tusrun ~ tusrulluk (in Yup'ik) tusrun (in Cup'ig) short, narrow, V-shaped calfskin on parka sleeve between shoulder and elbow of a traditional Yup’ik parka; pukiq light-colored, soft belly skin of caribou or reindeer used in fancy parka designs as trim on a parka; pukirneq skin of young caribou, used for making trim; naqyun (in Cup'ig) trim on parka or kuspuk; it’galqinraq strip of dried swan-foot skin, black in color, used as backing for decorative stitching; qercurtaq freeze-dried skin and white trim on dance hat.

The black skin of wolf fish (Anarhichas sp. qaculluk) was used for trim on parkas in the Yukon and Norton Sound regions.

Tassels (alngaq in Yup'ik and Cup'ik, aqevyar in Cup'ig) are hanging (dangling) decorative trimming ornaments of wolverine fur or beads on a parka or boot. The Yup'ik tassels are, kayurun ~ kay'urrun ~ kasurun (wolverine-fur decoration on the upper part of parka sleeve), megcugtaq (piece of wolf fur on the tip of the shoulder or armpit tassels of certain traditional Yup’ik parkas, said to represent falling snowflakes in the winter, as a reminder to not waste food), pitgarcuun (tassel hanging from the armpit or just below the armpit of the traditional Yup'ik parka with red beads said to represent the blood of the legendary hero Apanuugpak (or Iluvaktuq ?) who had been shot with an arrow in that part of his body), avan ~ avata (one of a pair of tassels on the sides of the piece of calfskin in the middle of a traditional Yup’ik parka), qemirrlugun (piece of calfskin in the middle of a traditional Yup'ik parka with three tassels hanging from it, often having a "drawn bow and arrow" or a fish-tail design stitched on it; smaller plate below the large front and back plates on parka), miryaruaq (one of two tassels on the chest and back of certain traditional Yup'ik parkas; said to represent caribou fat vomited out by Iluvaktuq, a legendary hero, when he fled his enemies), mumeq (a tassel, representing a drumstick, hanging from one of the calfskin pieces on the traditional Yup’ik qulitaq parka as worn in the coastal area), pequmiutaq (decorative small wolverine "tail" on a traditional Yup’ik parka), uulungak (piece of fringed fur (mink, squirrel belly, etc.) sewn on hem or hood of garment).

Apanuugpak (also known as Apanukpak or Apanurpaq), was Yup'ik legendary mythical great warrior figure or folk hero from the Kuskokwim and Nelson Island areas during the 18th century traditional bow and arrow warfare, which occurred for many decades, ending about 200 years ago in the Yup'ik region of Southwest Alaska. According to anthropologist Ann Fienup-Riordan, four separate continuing conflicts in the region were part of the wars. Significantly, the Yup'ik Eskimos categorize the Apanuugpak stories as historical narratives (qanemcit) rather than mythical tales (qulirat). Apanuugpak convinced villages that war was a futile and wasteful activity. Robert Redford, the actor, attempted to make a movie about Apanuugpak, "The Winter Warrior." The movie was never completed. Yup’ik parkas told the legend of this great warrior. The parkas had two white strips on the shoulder area that meant "don’t tread on me, I’m a member of Apanuugpak’s tribe. These two white strips reminded people of the story told after Apanuugpak went caribou hunting with two of his warriors."

Armbands (kayurun in Yup'ik, Cup'ik, and Cup'ig) is biceps straps used in dancing by dance song director. Men wore fancy armbands around the upper arm when dancing without a parka. These were made of seal or caribou skin with the fur on the inside and tufts of dog fur or other fancy fur sewn on for decoration. The bands were approximately three inches wide and were not continuous, but rather a strip with skin ties at each end.

== Tools ==
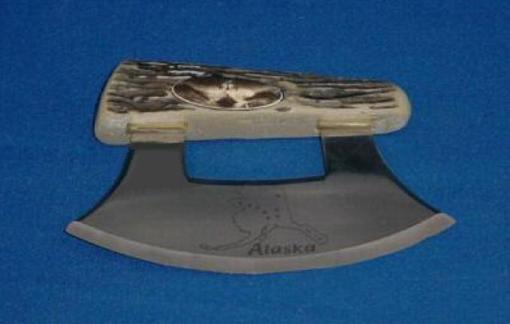
An ulu from Alaska

Yup'ik women roles included child rearing, food preparation and sewing. Skin sewing is artistic arena in which Yup'ik women and a few younger men excel. Everyday functional items like skin mittens, mukluks, and jackets are commonly made today, but the elegant fancy parkas of traditional times are now rare. The proper sewing of skins requires considerable and varied traditional knowledge and an intact extended family whose members help in hunting gathering, and processing the various components in addition to sewing. Women's tools include ulu, scraper, scraping board, needle, needle case, thimble, and pattern. There are many regional differences in the design and function of these tools.

Garments of the Alaska Native tradition are made using a variety of stitching techniques and with a variety of materials folded into the stitch.

Ulu, also Eskimo knife or woman's knife (uluaq in Yup'ik, kegginalek in Cup'ik, ulluar in Cup'ig) is multi-functional semilunar woman's knife. Ulus are made in different sizes depending upon the task for which they are intended. They are used for a broad range of jobs such as skinning and butchering carcasses, removing fat from skins, preparing meals, cutting skins for skin boats, and collecting shoe grass, as well as for sewing clothing and footwear.

Scraper or skin scraper (tellunrun [Kuskokwim], pellumrun [Yukon], ellumrun, ellumerrun, urumerun, urugun, calugun, cakuugun [Unaliq-Pastuliq] in Yup'ik cakivcissuun in Cup'ik, calugciss'un [stone-end scraper used for scraping skin], nengulerciss'un [scraper for fawn skins; tanning tool for softening and stretching skin made from bone or ivory] in Cup'ig): Once skins are dried they must be scraped before they are pliable enough to sew into skin clothing or footwear. Often a seamstress uses a sharp scraper to remove any dried fat. The tuluruaq large piece of bent wood firmly fixed to the ground over which a skin is placed for scraping and stretching and skin scraper with long handle for extra leverage.

Sinew (as "sewing sinew" yualukaq in Yup'ik; as "sewing, cordage and netting sinew", "thread" or "tendon" yualuq sg yualuit pl or eglu ~ egluq in Yup'ik, ivalu ~ ivaluq in Cup'ik and Egegik Yup'ik, iwalu in Cup'ig) is made from the tendons and ligaments of an animal's body. The tendons of large animals such as wild caribou (tuntu) and semi-domesticated reindeer (qusngiq), moose (tuntuvak), and beluga whale (cetuaq) (also, for other non-Yup'ik regions of Indigenous peoples of the North America: big horn sheep, black-tailed and white-tailed deer, elk or wapiti, and bison or buffalo) were used for sinew. Dried animal tendons known as sinew are used to make their clothing and footwear, and to sew bedding, tents and kayak covers. These tendons are usually sliced off the long muscles on either side of the spine of a caribou or beluga whale. Sometimes shorter tendons are taken from other animals' parts such as bird's foot. Yup'iks sewed using caribou (tuntut yualuit, tuntut ivaluit), moose (tuntuviit yualuit, tuntuviim eglua) or beluga (cetuat yualuit) sinews as thread in the old days. The hand-twisted sinew thread is yualukiuraq (in Yup'ik) or qip'ar (in Cup'ig). The iwalukegcaun (in Cup'ig) is wax or soap put on thread when sewing skin. The yualunguaq (in Yup'ik) is sinew thread for fish-skin.

Needle or sewing needle (mingqun sg mingqutek dual mingqutet pl in Yup'ik and Cup'ik, cikur in Cup'ig) is main tool for to sew (mingqe- in Yup'ik, Cup'ik, and Cup'ig) In the past Alaska Eskimo usually carved fine sewing needles out of walrus ivory or split them from bird bones. Also, made of squirrel bone. The small holes in the needles were drilled with a mouth-bow drill. Today metal needles have replaced the ivory and stone needles. Three-cornered skin-sewing needle, three-cornered needle or glover's needle (quagulek, ipgut’lek, anguarutnguaq, ciilaq ~ ciilaviq [Nelson Island], ulunalek [Egegik] in Yup'ik, umilek in Cup'ik, quaguleg in Cup'ig) used to sew lightweight skin without pre-punching. Other kind of needles is round needle (quaguilznguar in Cup'ig). Crane's foot needle (kakuun in Yup'ik and Cup'ik) is made from the front part of an uncooked crane's foot.

Needle case or needlecase (mingqusvik, mingqusviutaq, mingqucivik in Yup'ik and Cup'ik, cikiwig in Cup'ig). Northern (Inupiat) and southern (Yup'ik) seamstresses had different styles of needle cases. The Yup'ik preferred bone or ivory needle cases made with stoppers at each end. Needles stored in ivory needle cases or the hollow section of a swan wing bone.

Thimble (akngirnailitaq [Nelson Island, Bristol Bay], tekeq [Yukon, Egegik], curaq [Egegik], tekrun [Unaliq-Pastuliq] in Yup'ik, tekeq in Cup'ik, keniun in Cup'ig). Metal, ivory, or skin thimbles are worn on a seamstress's index finger to provide protection from needles. Skin thimbles are cut from shaved or bleached skins of bearded seals. The shell thimbles are used by Yup'iks."

Sewing Bag or sewing box, sewing case (kakivik in Yup'ik and Cup'ik, kakiwig in Cup'ig) which held a woman's needles, thimble, sinew thread, small knife, and whetstone. A woman's ability to sew and repair clothing was critical to her husband's success as well as the whole family's survival. A girl could only become a wife after she learned to sew. Men sewed repairs for themselves while out hunting. Iñupiaq and Yup’ik sewing kits epitomize the economy and thoughtfulness of Eskimo ingenuity with materials.

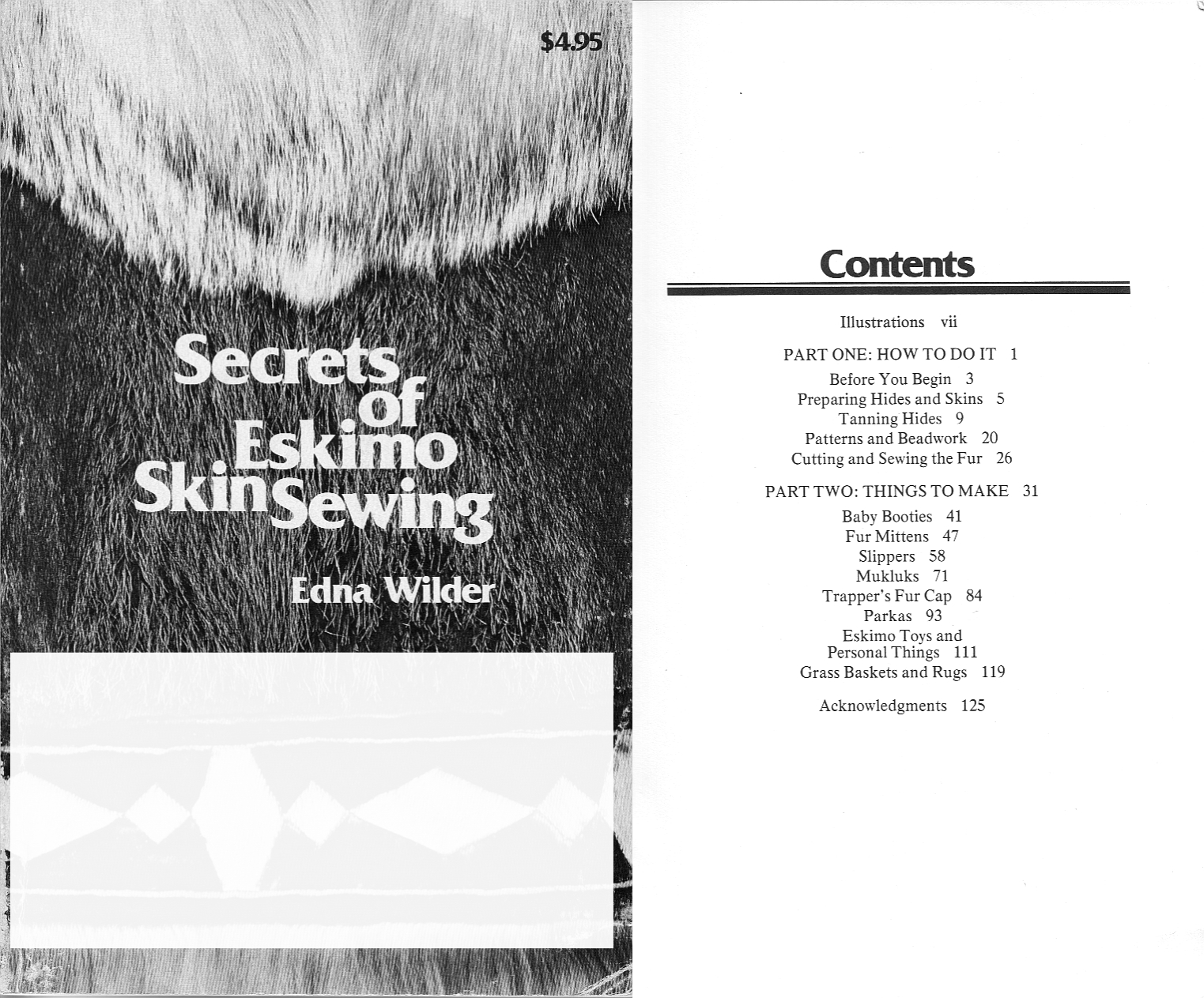
Edna Wilder (1976), Secrets of Eskimo skin sewing. Anchorage, Alaska: Alaska Northern Publishing Company, 1976. Edna Wilder was the first native instructor in the art of skin sewing class held at the University of Alaska.

Pattern (cuqcaun, cuqcissuun, cuqyun in Yup'ik and Cup'ik, cuqciss'un in Cup'ig; "gunsight; ruler; pattern; measuring device; measurement"). Yup’ik pattern-makers use rectangles, squares, rhombi, and right triangles in different sizes to create a variety of interesting symmetrical patterns similar to linear frieze patterns. They use shapes of two contrasting colors to produce visually pleasing effects. The shapes derived from rectangles or squares fit together in several different ways. This allows people to make many different patterns using the same basic shapes. Yup’ik designers use linear patterns for parka borders (parka bottoms and sleeves), headbands, and boots. These patterns all follow a few rules. The pattern pieces (tumaqcaq sg [in the Yup'ik Eskimo Dictionary as tumaqcaaq] tumaqcat pl or tumartaq sg in Yup'ik) are polygon geometric shape and like patchwork. The hide cut in a spiral pattern producing a long narrow strip of babiche is aqsarqelleq (in Unaliq-Pastuliq Yup'ik).

Yup'ik mathematics and science evolved to solve problems associated with living and traveling in the difficult world of the tundra. As a result, the human body became the center of mathematics. Yup'ik clothing patterns also provided a means for teaching geometry and could be used to teach literacy. Traditional geometric patterns on parkas were walking stories that told about legendary people, identified regions, and indicated families. One technique was to reproduce designs used in Yup'ik clothing and crafts in a set of geometric manipulatives to assist in teaching mathematical patterns, fractions, simple algebra, and tessellations. An important and common Yup’ik measure is the "knuckle", which forms the basis for constructing a square, which can be transformed into geometrically pleasing patterns that adorn squirrel parkas or become the basis of circles used for ceremonial headdresses. This knuckle is the middle [intermediate] phalange of the index finger and the “knuckle length” measure (not fingerbreadth) is a common unit in the Yup’ik measurement system.

Yup'ik non-standard measurement units of length: aaggarner (in Cup'ig) measurement, the distance from the tip of the thumb to the tip of the middle finger with fingers spread out; angvaneq (in Yup'ik) measurement, the distance from the center of the chest (or the armpit ?) to the end of the fingertips of the outstreched arm and hand; cagner (in Cup'ig) measurement between tips of fingers on opposing hands when arms are extended out from the sides of the body; ikuyegarneq (in Yup'ik) ikuyegarner (in Cup'ig) measurement from one's elbow to the end of his fist; ikuyegneq (in Yup'ik) measurement from one's elbow to end of his outstretched fingertips; iqelqin (in Yup'ik) measurement from the tip of one's thumb to the tip of one's index fingers are stretched out from each other; itegneq (in Yup'ik) measurement from tip of toes to end of heel; foot (in length); it’ganeq (in Yup'ik) measurement from tip of toes to end of heel; foot (in length); malruneq (in Yup'ik) measurement of the width at their ends of the index finger and the middle finger held next to each other; naparneq (in Yup'ik) measurement from tip of extended thumb to opposite side fist; patneq (in Yup'ik) measurement, the width of the four fingers (thumb excluded) of one's hand; pingayuneq (in Yup'ik) measurement of the width at their ends of the index finger, the middle finger, and the ring finger held next to each other; pupsuneq (in Yup'ik) measurement from the thumb (outer edge of nail) to the second joint of the index finger curled up with section from tip to first joint along inner edge of thumb; qerruuner (in Cup'ig) measurement from fingertip to armpit or chest; quruner (in Cup'ig) measurement from fingertip to the armpit or chest; tallineq (in Yup'ik) measurement from one's fingertips to his armpit with the arm (and hand) outstretched; 'tallinin (in Yup'ik) measurement from the extremity of one’s fist to his armpit with the arm outstretched; taluyaneq (in Yup'ik) measurement, the distance from the folded elbow of one outstretched arm to the ends of the fingertips of the other outstretched arm; teklin (in Yup'ik) measurement from the tip of the thumb to tip of index finger when each is stretched out away from the other; tekneq (in Yup'ik) measurement being the width of the last section of one’s index finger; tumagneq (in Yup'ik) measurement of the width of the palm (flattened and with the fingers and thumb held together); tusneq (in Yup'ik) measurement being the width from the outside edge of one should to the outside edge of the other; yegyameg (in Cup'ig) from elbow (measuring to tip of hand).

== Materials of Yup'ik garments ==
=== Raw materials ===
The primary subsistence activity for the Yup'ik is fishing, though hunting supplements the food supply and provides skins for clothing. The Yup'ik fur and skin clothing, like other Eskimo groups, is a key factor in ensuring their survival in the northernmost reaches of the globe. The raw materials of traditional Yup'ik clothing are skin (hide) and fur (pelt), intestine (gut), sinew, and grass. The raw material resources are sea and land mammals, birds, fish and plants. Traditionally, skins of birds, fish, and marine and land animals were used to make clothing. Hunting clothes were designed to be insulated and waterproof. Fish skin and marine mammal intestines were used for waterproof shells and boots. Grass was used to make insulating socks, and as a waterproof thread. Wastefulness being disrespectful, Yup'ik elders made use of every last scrap from hunts and harvests: seal guts became warm, waterproof, and breathable parkas; the skins of fish were fashioned into waterproof mittens, while their heads and entrails were stored in naturally refrigerated pits as insurance against future famine. Dried grasses became anything from insulating socks to bedding to sled rope, or even goggles to protect against snow blindness.

Skin or hide (amiq sg amiik dual amiit pl in Yup'ik and Cup'ik, amir in Cup'ig). Traditionally, clothing may be made of a variety of skins, including bearded seal skin (maklaarem amia), hair-seal skin (nayiim amia), two-year-old spotted sea skin (useqniim amia), walrus skin (asverem amia), caribou skin (tuntum amia), calfskin (kuluviim amia), bearskin (carayiim amia), wolfskin (keglunrem amia), wolverine skin (terikaniam amia), oldsquaw duck skin (allgiaraam amia), swan skin (qugyuum amia) fish skins (neqet amiit), and others. Traditionally, virtually all parkas worn by the Nunivaarmiut were made from the skins of seals, caribou, or birds; the skins of reindeer have been used in more recent times. Mink and fox skins were also utilized in the past, the latter occasionally for the ruff since it was too thin to be durable enough for men's parkas. Mainland furs that have been used in recent times but not in the past include ground squirrels received from the people of Nelson Island who, in turn, obtained them from the Kuskokwim River, and wolverine used primarily for trim. Muskrat skins (single layer) and Arctic ground squirrel (double layer) were used for winter parkas because these furs are light in weight but very warm. However, caribou (or its domesticated cousin, the reindeer, introduced to Alaska in the 1890s) is also quite warm and also more durable, making it perhaps the most desired material for winter clothing. Historically, ground squirrel, muskrat, and caribou were commonly used for clothing.

Traditionally, Nunivaarmiut Cup'ig skin clothing was washed in urine, but by 1939 only one family was doing this regularly. The dirty parts of a parka were immersed in a wooden urine dish and the fur kneaded down into the urine with a movement like kneading bread dough. Then the garment was shaken out and hung up to dry. Sometimes it was rinsed in clear water.

Fur or pelt (melquq in Yup'ik and Cup'ik, melqur in Cup'ig). Fur from land animals was warmer than other kinds of skin. Red-fox and white-fox skin parkas were warm. Mink, otter, and muskrat skins were used as parkas around here. Trapping of furbearing animals (melqulek literally "one with fur, one having fur", derived from melquq and the postbase -lek) provides a large part of the income earned by the Alaska Natives as well as many of the white residents of Southwestern Alaska. The principal animals hunted and trapped for fur are black, polar and brown bear, beaver, coyote, blue, cross, red, silver, and white fox, hare, lynx, marmot, marten, mink, muskrat, otter, squirrel, weasel, wolf and wolverine. The highest prices are received for marten, mink, beaver, otter, and silver fox, followed by wolf, coyote, and wolverine; but the major portion of income is derived from mink, beaver, marten, and muskrat due to the greater abundance of these species. The fur of the wolf, and wolverine have little commercial value in the fur market but are utilized by the Alaska Natives for parka trimming.

Gut or intestines (qilu, qiluq, qiluk sg qiluit pl in Yup'ik and Cup'ik, qilu in Cup'ig) and large intestines (qilurpak sg qilurpiit pl in Yup'ik and Cup'ik, qilurpag in Cup'ig) were used to make waterproof raincoat parkas and boots. Walrus or bearded seal intestines were considered better materials for rain parkas than the intestines of small seals. In summer they were used as rain parkas and were as waterproof as garments made of intestine. The smoother inside of the gut would become the outside of the parka. Bear gut (taqukinraq sg taqukinraat pl in Yup'ik and Cup'ik) parkas are said to last longer than seal gut (irnerrluk in Yup'ik and Cup'ik, irnerrlug in Cup'ig) parkas. The seal-gut material (qalirkaq in Yup'ik and Cup'ik), esp. baby bearded-seal gut (maklagaat qalirkait) were used for smoke-hole window.

Tendon (also with means "sinew" or "thread" yualuq sg yualuit pl or eglu ~ egluq in Yup'ik, ivalu ~ ivaluq in Cup'ik and Egegik Yup'ik, iwalu in Cup'ig) are made of thick, closely packed bundles of collagen fibers. The caribou, moose, and beluga whale tendons were made sinew used for thread to sew with.

=== Resources ===
The homeland of Yup'ik Eskimos is the Dfc climate type subarctic tundra ecosystem. Their lands are located in different five of 32 ecoregions of Alaska:

1. Nulato Hills ecoregion: The low, rolling Nulato Hills form a divide between the Bering Sea and the Yukon River, with streams on the east side flowing into the river and those on the west draining into Norton Sound. The largest communities are Unalakleet and Mountain Village. Native people of this region are Inupiat, Koyukon Athabaskans and Central Yup'iks.
2. Yukon-Kuskokwim Delta ecoregion: The Yukon-Kuskokwim Delta in southwestern Alaska result from the deposition of heavy sediment loads from the glacial Yukon and Kuskokwim Rivers. Bethel is the largest community. This ecoregion is the heart of the area inhabited traditionally by the Yup'ik people.
3. Ahklun Mountains ecoregion: Located in the southwest part of the state, the Ahklun and Kilbuck Mountains define the divide between the drainages into Kuskokwim and Bristol Bays. Togiak is the largest community. Native people of this region are Central Yup'iks.
4. Bristol Bay Lowlands ecoregion: Past glaciation in the surrounding Ahklun Mountains and Aleutian Range resulted in this flat-to-rolling moraine and outwash-mantled lowland around Bristol Bay in Southwest Alaska. Dillingham is the largest community. Native people of this region are Central Yup'iks and Alutiiq (Sugpiaq). The Bristol Bay Yup'ik settled the northern half of the region, while the Alutiiq settled the southern half.
5. Bering Sea Islands ecoregion: Five major islands (St. Lawrence, Nunivak, St. Matthew, and the two Pribilof Islands of the St. Paul and St. George) and their adjacent islets dot the inner shelf of the Bering Sea and constitute the Bering Sea Islands ecoregion. Central Yup'ik and Siberian Yupik people settled the larger islands closer to the Alaska mainland.

==== Sea mammals ====
Marine mammals or sea mammals (imarpigmiutaq sg imarpigmiutaat pl in Yup'ik and Cup'ik, imarpillar in Cup'ig) are only fin-footed species, such as seals and walruses. There are four species of seals in Alaska that are referred to as ice seals (or ice associated seals) because they use sea ice for some important life history events such as pupping, nursing, molting, and resting. This ice seals (ringed, bearded, spotted, and ribbon seals) are all used for subsistence by coastal Alaska Natives for food, oil, materials, clothing, and handicrafts. Sealskin is ideal for milder, damp weather as the hair provides very little insulation, however, sealskins are wind and water-resistant. Sealskin parkas were the most common type in former times, being worn by people of all ages and both sexes. A sealskin parka for a woman or man required five skins. In the past, Yup'ik people relied on seals primarily for their meat, oil, and skin. The hide and sinew were commonly used as clothing, rope, nets, and for sewing. Sealskin could be used to make strands for rope and were used to make maklak skin boots. Intestines (guts) were used to make waterproof parkas. And even the fur of an unborn pup was used as a favorite trimming for clothing.

- Bearded seal Erignathus barbatus (maklak sg makliik dual makliit pl in Yup'ik and Cup'ik, maklag in Cup'ig) is the best-known species of the seals living in the all Eskimo (Yupik and Inuit) regions. For Yup'ik hunters, bearded seals were the seal of choice. Bearded seals were widely considered the best seal for meat. The blubber was rendered into oil and the hide used for a variety of items, including boot soles, rope, mats, and rifle cases.
- Ringed seal Pusa hispida or hair seal (nayiq sg nayiik dual nayiit pl in Yup'ik and Cup'ik, nayir in Cup'ig), known as "winter seal" or "regular seal", is the only seals generally available throughout the region all winter. In terms of meat, ringed seals were generally second in preference to bearded seals. However, ringed seals were the first choice of many hunters for oil. Skins from ringed seals were used for clothing such as boots, pants, mittens, and hats and for making floats for whaling.
- Spotted seal Phoca largha, Phoca vitulina largha and/or harbor seal Phoca vitulina (issuriq sg issurik dual issurit pl in Yup'ik and Cup'ik, issuri in Cup'ig) skins were in demand by skin sewers who fashioned them into slippers, boots, mittens, parkas, and floats.
- Ribbon seal Histriophoca fasciata (qasruliq in Yup'ik and Cup'ik, qasruleg in Cup'ig) was hunted only occasionally. Their meat is rich in blood and not a favored food, but some hunters liked the oil. Ribbon seals, particularly males, used was to be hunted for their skins, and still are at times, but this is less common than before. Because ribbon seal skins tear easily, they are most suitable for decoration or ceremonial clothing.
- Steller's sea lion Eumetopias jubatus (uginaq sg uginak dual uginat pl in Yup'ik and Cup'ik, apakcug in Cup'ig) was not hunted or hunted only occasionally (at the present time). Sea lions are most common near the St. Lawrence Island Siberian Yupik communities of Gambell and Savoonga.
- Walrus or Pacific walrus Odobenus rosmarus divergens (asveq sg asverek ~ asevrek dual asveret ~ asevret pl in Yup'ik kaugpak in Cup'ik, kaugpag in Cup'ig). Hunting of walrus and other marine mammals in western Bristol Bay, including Round Island (Yup'ik Qayaciq literally "place to go in a kayak") as part of the Walrus Islands State Game Sanctuary, by the native people (Yup’ik-speaking Tuyuryarmiut) of the Togiak area over the last 2,500 years is documented by archaeological and ethnohistorical evidence. Until the late 1930s and early 1940s, well-organized groups of hunters from Togiak traveled in kayaks to Round Island (the most reliable hunting location) and other islands armed with spears and harpoons to harvest walrus. Most parts of the walrus were used for food, raw materials, and sharing with inland villages. Another use of walrus which began in the early 19th century and has continued is the taking of walrus for their ivory for trade and sale. Walrus hunting was an important activity in Nushagak Bay and surrounding area during the Russian period. In addition to hunting for food, walrus ivory was traded at the Russian America company post, Alexandrovski, on Nushagak Bay. Walrus were hunted off Hagemeister Island, among other places. The Russian-era trade in walrus ivory peaked from 1821–1842. The Aglegmiut Eskimos of Bristol Bay were known for their skill as ivory carvers.
- Beluga whale or white whale Delphinapterus leucas (cetuaq sg cetuak dual cetuat pl in Yup'ik and Cup'ik, cetuar in Cup'ig). The shallow waters around Nunivak Island generally host low cetacean populations, although beluga (Delphinapterus leucas), Dall's porpoise (Phocoenoides dalli), killer whales (Orcinas orca) occasionally visit the area. Dark beluga whale sinew (cetuat yualuit) was occasionally used for decorative stitching by Nunivaarmiut Cup'ig.

==== Land mammals ====
Terrestrial mammals or land mammals (nunarmiutaq sg nunarmiutaat pl in Yup'ik) are game animals and furbearers.

- Game animals (pitarkaq sg pitarkat pl in Yup'ik and Cup'ik, pitarkar sg pitarkat pl in Cup'ig). Caribou, moose and "bears" are included in the definition of the word pitarkat.
- Caribou or Porcupine caribou, wild caribou Rangifer tarandus granti (tuntu sg tuntuk dual tuntut pl or tuntupik sg tuntupiik dual tuntupiit pl or tuntupiaq sg tuntupiak dual tuntupiat pl in Yup'ik and Cup'ik, tuntupig in Cup'ig). Caribou skin is ideal for cold, dry weather as each hair has a honeycomb core that traps air, which is an excellent insulator. Sealskins and caribou skins were always kept separate and not combined in the same garment except for occasional decorative strips. Yup’ik dance fans decorated with caribou throat hair, caribou leg-skins were made into high boots, sleeping bags for travel made by joining two caribou skins and fur-side-out fancy parkas. Historically, caribou were hunted in the fall and skins were brought home for skin clothing. Caribou hunts were discouraged by the Russian and American traders as they felt it took the trappers away from their trap lines. Prior to European contact, caribou were important not only for their meat but for the skins which were an important item used in clothing. The Russians encouraged the Eskimos to adopt Western-style dress in order to release more furs for trading. In the spring, some people hunted caribou along the inland river ways.

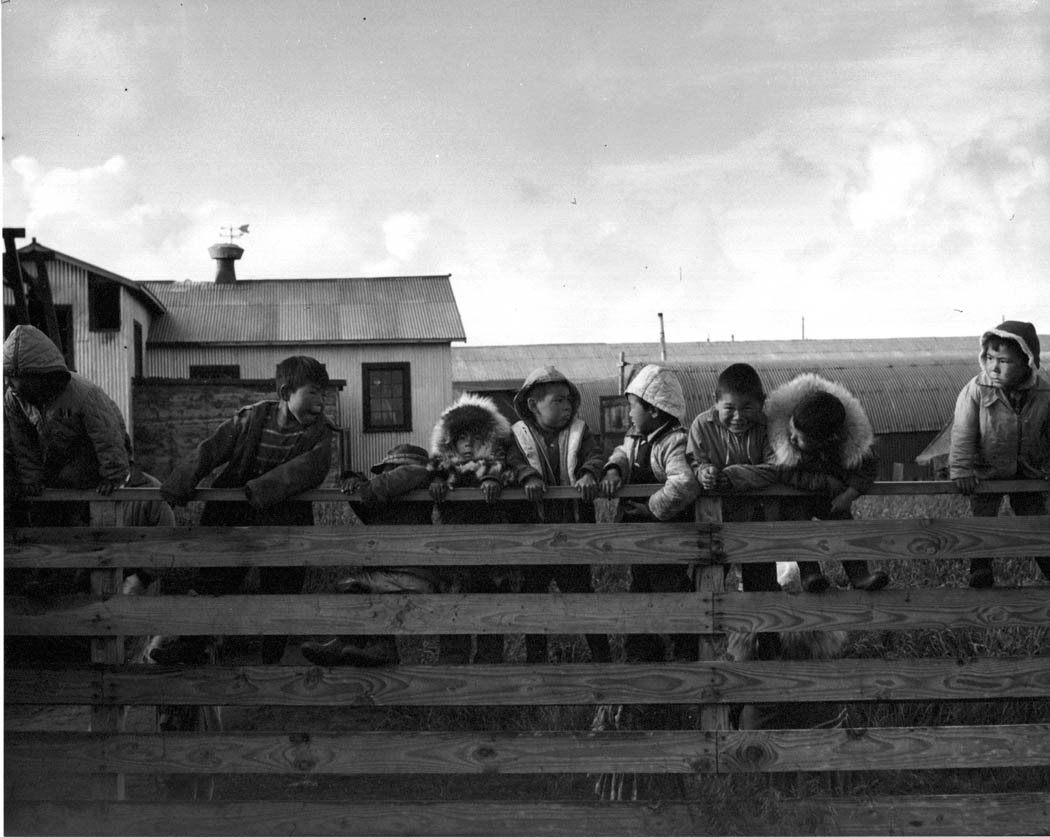
A group of Nunivak Cup'ig children playing on a fence at the reindeer roundup on Nunivak

- Reindeer or (semi)domestic caribou Rangifer tarandus tarandus (qusngiq sg qusngik dual qusngit pl in Yup'ik and Cup'ik, qusngir sg qusngig dual qusngit pl in Cup'ig). The word qusngiq which is derived from the Chukchee qoraŋe (ӄораӈы) or Koryak qoyaŋa (ӄойаӈа). In Europe, use the terms "caribou" and "reindeer" synonymously, but in Alaska and Canada "reindeer" refers exclusively to semi-domesticated forms. Only in North America are wild Rangifer referred to as "caribou". In Eurasia, "reindeer" are classified as either domesticated or wild. Domestic reindeer (Rangifer tarandus tarandus) were introduced into Alaska 100 years ago and have been maintained as semidomestic livestock. They have had contact with wild caribou (R. t. granti) herds, including deliberate crossbreeding and mixing in the wild. Reindeer have considerable potential as a domestic animal for meat or velvet antler production, and wild caribou are important to subsistence and sport hunters. The Bureau of Indian Affairs (BIA) managed reindeer operations on the Nunivak Island beginning in 1940. The Nunivak herd is composed of about 4,000 reindeer. The southern half of Nunivak is a designated Wilderness area, which presents challenges in summertime herding, since use of motorized recreational vehicles is forbidden within the Wilderness area without adequate snow cover. In the more recent past, when reindeer skins have been used for parkas, the front was usually taken from the ventral side of the deer, the back from the dorsal area, and leg strips were used for the sleeves. Hides are used for clothing, mukluks, blankets, mittens, tents, boat coverings, sleeping bags, house coverings and insulation. Back sinew is used to make thread. Hard antlers and bone are used to make utensils, tools and decorative objects.
- Moose or Alaska moose Alces alces gigas (tuntuvak sg tuntuviik dual tuntuviit pl in Yup'ik and Cup'ik, tuntuwag in Cup'ig, literally "big caribou")
- Muskox Ovibos moschatus (umingmar, maskar in Nunivak Cup'ig). Alaska's original muskox were hunted to extinction in the mid-1800s - perhaps by whalers and others. They had originally ranged Alaska's arctic and western coastal tundra. In 1935-1936 the U.S. Biological Survey brought 31 muskoxen from Greenland to Nunivak Island in an effort to reestablish the species in Alaska and as a means for subsistence living. Because the animals were federally protected, and since the Nunivaarmiut were afraid of them, they added nothing to the local economy until 40 years later. when Nunivak women learned to make fine items of clothing from the underwool of the muskox (qiviut). The muskox are large animals that look a lot like bison, but have wool like sheep, and has a two-layered coat, and qiviut refers specifically to the soft underwool beneath the longer outer wool. The first modern hunting season was in 1975. Today the Nunivak herd numbers around 600 animals, down from a high of around 700 animals in 1968.
- Furbearers or fur-bearing animals (melqulek sg melqulget pl in Yup'ik and Cup'ik, melquleg in Cup'ig) are commonly trapped for their pelts. Taking advantage of Alaska's rich supply of fur-bearing animals, the Yup'ik use a variety of materials for their parkas. Beaver, river otter, red fox, Arctic fox, marten, lynx, mink, ground squirrel, marmots, and muskrat are trapped in specific regions during the fall and winter.
- Grizzly bear or brown bear Ursus arctos horribilis (taqukaq sg taqukaat pl or carayak sg carayiit plin Yup'ik and Cup'ik, paugnar in Cup'ig)
- Black bear or American black bear Ursus americanus (tan'gerliq in Yup'ik and Cup'ik, tungulzria in Cup'ig). Black bear skins are dried and used for making mukluks, and trim on other articles of clothing.
- Polar bear Ursus maritimus (nanuaq in Yup'ik and Cup'ik, arlunar in Cup'ig)
- Wolf or gray wolf Canis lupus (kegluneq sg keglunerek dual kegluneret pl in Yup'ik and Cup'ik, kegg'luner in Cup'ig)
- Dog or adult dog Canis lupus familiaris (qimugta sg qimugtek dual qimugtet pl in Yup'ik and Cup'ik, qimugta sg qimugteg dual qimugtet pl in Cup'ig), Puppy or juvenile dog (qimugkauyar(aq) sg qimugkauyaraat pl in Yup'ik and Cup'ik, qimukcuar(ar) in Cup'ig). For thousands of years, dogs have been tightly interwoven in the Yup'ik way of life (yuuyaraq in Yup'ik, cuuyaraq in Cup'ik), for transportation and companionship. Adult dog skins not used in clothing production. Only juvenile dog (puppy) skins are usable. Puppy skin parkas, with the fur inside, were made for babies and small children. Puppies one and two months old were killed for the purpose.
- Red fox Vulpes vulpes (kaviaq sg kaviak dual kaviat pl in Yup'ik and Cup'ik, kavviar in Cup'ig)
- Arctic fox Vulpes lagopus (uliiq sg uliirek dual uliiret pl in Yup'ik and Cup'ik, qaterlir [white fox], eqyerer [blue fox] illaassug [cross fox] in Cup'ig)
- Lynx or Canada lynx Lynx canadensis (tertuli sg tertulit pl in Yup'ik and Cup'ik)
- Sea otter Enhydra lutris (arrnaq in Yup'ik and Cup'ik, aatagar in Cup'ig)
- Land otter or river otter Lontra canadensis (cuignilnguq sg cuignilnguut pl in Yup'ik and Cup'ik, cenkar, pirturcir(ar) in Cup'ig)
- Mink Neovison vison (imarmiutaq sg imarmiutaat pl in Yup'ik and Cup'ik, imarmiutar sg imarmiutat pl in Cup'ig). Mink skin parkas, and also mink pants for small boys, used to be made.
- Weasel or stoat Mustela erminea (narullgiq in Yup'ik and Cup'ik, terriar(ar) [in winter coloration] narullgir [in summer coloration] in Cup'ig)
- Marten Martes americana (qavcicuaq in Yup'ik and Cup'ik)
- Wolverine Gulo gulo luscus (terikaniaq sg terikaniak dual terikaniat pl in Yup'ik and Cup'ik, qavcig, terikaniar in Cup'ig). Wolverine hair is ideal for parka hood ruffs because it does not collect the frost produced by breathing, and its long hairs block the wind to prevent frostbite. Wolverine cuffs (on parka) help to warm the wrists. The front and back or side panels of Yup'ik boots are decorated with otter tassels, wolverine yassels, red yarn, and sometimes a string of beads.
- Muskrat Ondatra zibethicus (kanaqlak sg kanaqliik dual kanaqliit pl or tevyuli in Yup'ik and Cup'ik, kanaqlag in Cup'ig)
- Vole Microtus miurus (singing vole) and Clethrionomys rutilus (northern red-backed vole) (avelngaq in Yup'ik and Cup'ik)
- Collared lemming or northern collared lemming Dicrostonyx groenlandicus (qilagmiutaq in Yup'ik and Cup'ik)
- Brown lemming or Nunivak Island brown lemming Lemmus trimucronatus harroldi (pugultu in Cup'ig)
- Beaver Castor canadensis (paluqtaq sg paluqtak dual paluqtat pl in Yup'ik and Cup'ik, paluqtar in Cup'ig)
- Porcupine Erethizon dorsatum (issaluuq sg issaluut pl in Yup'ik and Cup'ik)
- Tree squirrel or red squirrel Tamiasciurus hudsonicus (qiguiq in Yup'ik and Cup'ik)
- Ground squirrel or parky squirrel, parka squirrel Spermophilus parryii (qanganaq sg qanganat pl in Yup'ik and Cup'ik, qanganar in Cup'ig). The fancy parka or atkupiaq is made of ground squirrel pelts, preferred among the Yup'ik for winter clothing because of its warmth and lightness. Parkas made from ground squirrel skins were especially light and warm. Normally the skins of 45 squirrels were necessary to make a man's parka and 35 for a woman's.
- Marmot or hoary marmot Marmota caligata (cikigpak sg cikigpiit pl in Yup'ik and Cup'ik)
- Hare or jackrabbit, tundra hare, Arctic hare (but true Arctic hare is Lepus arcticus and it's not live in Alaska) Lepus othus (qayuqeggliq in Yup'ik and Cup'ik, qayuqegglir in Cup'ig)
- Rabbit or snowshoe hare, snowshoe rabbit Lepus americanus (maqaruaq sg maqaruak dual maqaruat pl in Yup'ik and Cup'ik, maqaruar in Cup'ig)

==== Birds ====
Birds (tengmiaq sg tengmiak dual tengmiat pl or yaqulek sg yaqulgek dual yaqulget pl in Yup'ik and Cup'ik, tengmiar sg tengmiag dual tengmiat pl in Cup'ig) are used mostly for garment as parka (eider, duck, murre, guillemot, auklet, puffin, kittiwake, cormorant, owl) or cap (puffin, eider, murre) and tool as needle (crane). Not only did people prize bird skins for parka material, but they used their feathers and bones for many things such as fire-bath hats, dance fans, dust brooms, needle cases, even peashooters.

- Common eider or Pacific eider Somateria mollissima (metraq sg metraak dual metraat pl in Yup'ik and Cup'ik, angiikvak in northern Yup'ik dialects, metr(ar), nanwista, metrapig ♀ tunupista ♂ in Cup'ig)
- King eider Somateria mollissima (qengallek sg qengallgek dual qengallget pl in Yup'ik and Cup'ik, qengalleg in Cup'ig). They made those king eider skins into parkas for children.
- Steller's eider Polysticta stelleri (anarnissakaq sg anarnissakat pl [Yukon], caqiar(aq) [Kuskokwim] in Yup'ik, qaciar(ar) in Cup'ig)
- Oldsquaw or long-tailed duck Clangula hyemalis (allgiar(aq) sg allgiaraat pl [Kuskokwim], allgiar [Bristol Bay], aliaaliq [Unaliq-Pastuliq], aarraaliq, aarraangiiq [Kuskokwim] in Yup'ik, aarraangiiraq sg aarraangiirat pl or aarrangyaraq in Cup'ik, aarrangiir in Cup'ig). Like other birds, oldsquaws have the best skins in autumn after they have shed and re-grown their feathers. Oldsquaw skins, being thinner, were used for women's parkas.
- Swan or tundra swan, whistling swan Cygnus columbianus columbianus (qugyuk sg qugyuuk dual qugyuut pl in Yup'ik and Cup'ik, qugsuk [Unaliq-Pastuliq], caqulegpak [Egegik], qugyug in Cup'ig) skins used to make parka.
- Sandhill crane Grus canadensis (qucillgaq sg qucillgaak dual qucillgaat pl in Yup'ik and Cup'ik, qucilkuryug in Cup'ig). Needle (kakuun) made from the front part of an uncooked crane's foot.

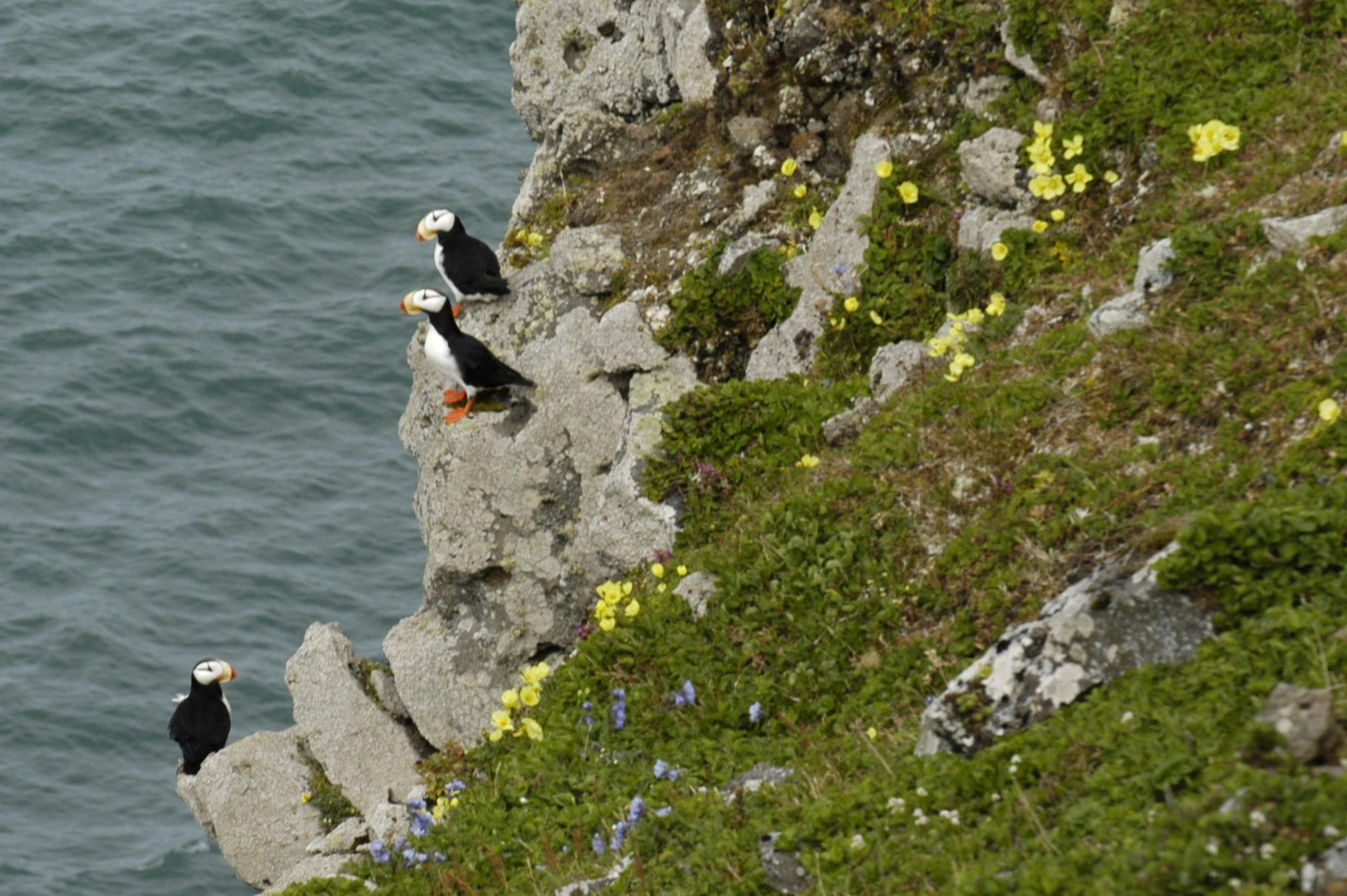
Horned puffins on a Nunivak Island sea cliff, August 2008. Horned puffin skins were counted and sold in "knots" or bundles of six. Thirty-four skins were necessary for a man's parka and 28 for a woman's.

- Common murre or common guillemot Uria aalge (alpa ~ alpaq sg alpak dual alpat pl in Yup'ik and Cup'ik, alpa sg alpag dual alpat pl in Cup'ig)
- Pigeon guillemot Cepphus columba (ciguraq sg ciguraat pl in Yup'ik and Cup'ik, cigurer sg cigurat pl in Cup'ig)
- Crested auklet Aethia cristatella (cip'lagar, cukilpag in Cup'ig)
- Horned puffin Fratercula corniculata (qilangaq, qengacuar(aq) in Yup'ik and Cup'ik, qilangar, tunngar in Cup'ig)
- Black-legged kittiwake Rissa tridactyla (naruyacuaq in Yup'ik and Cup'ik, tengaurta sg tengaurtet pl or tengauqsarar(ar), qarliar(ar) in Cup'ig)
- Pelagic cormorant Phalacrocorax pelagicus (uyalek sg uyalget pl in Yup'ik and Cup'ik, uyaleg sg uyallget pl in Cup'ig)
- Snowy owl Bubo scandiacus (anipa ~ anipaq sg anipat pl in Yup'ik and Cup'ik, anipar in Cup'ig)

==== Fish ====
Fish (neqa sg neqek dual neqet pl in Yup'ik and Cup'ik neqa or iqallug in Cup'ig) is one of the most common Yup'ik foods. Fish skins (neqet amiit or amirak ~ amiraq in Yup'ik) and intestines are used for waterproof clothing (amiragglugaq) in a few areas, especially in southern coastal Alaska. For example, commercial herring fishers from Toksook Bay, Alaska still prefer intestine parkas to heavy-duty raincoats, as they are lighter and allow body vapor to pass through the skin membrane while preventing rain from entering. In former times, rather crudely made shirts without hoods were made of local salmon or trout skins. Through rarely used today, in the past fish skin was also used for waterproof boots (amirak ~ amiraq) and mittens (arilluk) also parka (qasperrluk), making these items water-repellent and durable. Fish skin was also used to make parkas, mittens, and pants for summer use. The sinew for fish skins known as yualunguaq (fish-skin thread).

- Pacific salmons Oncorhynchus (neqpik sg neqpiik dual neqpiit in Yup'ik, literally "real fish")
- Dog salmon or chum salmon Oncorhynchus keta (iqalluk sg iqalluuk dual iqalluut pl [Kuskokwim, Yukon], kangitneq sg kangitnerek dual kangitneret pl [Bristol Bay] in Yup'ik, mac'utar sg mac'ut'ag dual mac'ut'at pl in Cup'ig)
- Silver salmon or coho salmon Oncorhynchus kisutch (qakiiyaq sg qakiiyak dual qakiiyat pl [Bristol Bay Kuskokwim ], uqurliq [Yukon], caayuryaq [Unaliq-Pastuliq] in Yup'ik, qavlunaq in Cup'ik, ciayuryar sg ciayuryag dual ciayuryat pl in Cup'ig)
- King salmon or Chinook salmon Oncorhynchus tschawytscha (taryaqvak sg taryaqviik dual taryaqviit pl [Bristol Bay Nushagak, Kuskokwim, Yukon] tarsarpak [Unaliq-Pastuliq] kiagtaq [Yukon] in Yup'ik, taryaqvak in Cup'ik, taryaqvag pl in Cup'ig)
- Trout (charr) or salmon trout, Dolly Varden Salvelinus malma (iqallugpik sg iqallugpiik dual iqallugpiit pl [Kuskokwim, Yukon], yugyaq [Bristol Bay] in Yup'ik, iqalluyagar sg iqalluyagag dual iqalluyagat pl in Cup'ig)

==== Plants ====
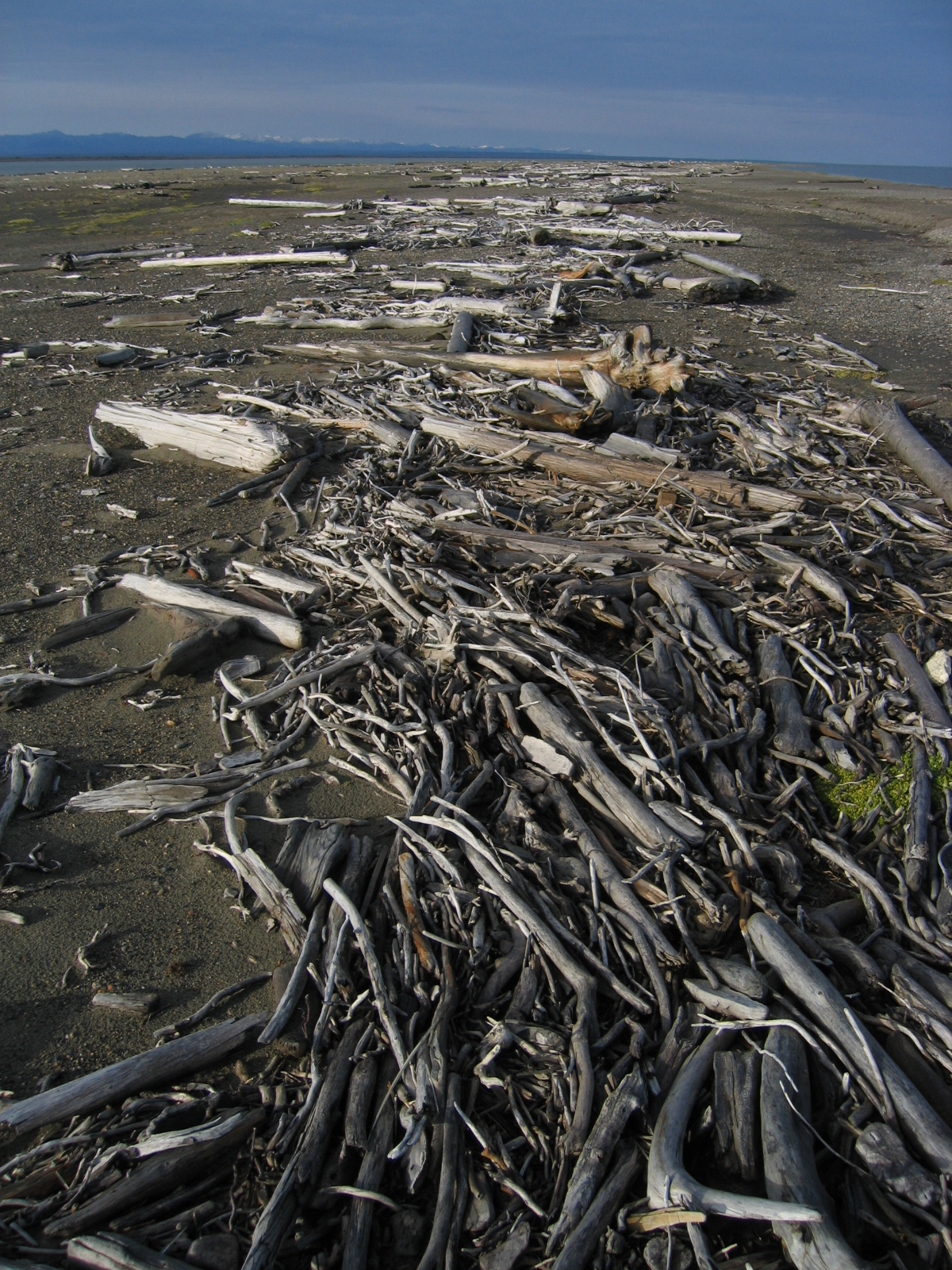
Driftwood on Arey Island on the Alaska North Slope of Inupiat lands

Plants (naunraq sg naunraat pl in Yup'ik and Cup'ik, naucir(ar) in Cup'ig)

- Trees. Along the treeless coast and islands of Alaska, driftwood has always been the main source of wood for people. Driftwood mainly transported by rivers and delivered by the sea is a natural and renewable resource. In the Yup’ik area, driftwood species commonly used includes white spruce, willow and cottonwood are mostly used, but occasionally logs of red cedar, Alaska yellow cedar, and hemlock are found.
- Spruce Picea spp. (kevraartuq sg kevraartuk dual kevraartut pl in Yup'ik and Cup'ik, equgpigar in Cup'ig) species of Yup'ik regions are only white and black spruces. The white spruce (Picea glauca) through interior Alaska corresponding to the range of the spruce-hardwood forest, north and west to tree limit. From Firth River and its tributary Joe Creek on Arctis slope, west along south slopes of Brooks Range from Arctic and Wiseman to Noatak River. South in eastern part of Seward Peninsula to Unalakleet, St. Marys on Yukon River, Bethel on Kuskokwim River, and Dillingham, and Naknek Lake near base of Alaska Peninsula. The black spruce (Picea mariana) Interior Alaska within range of the spruce-hardwood forest and north to southern slopes of Brooks Range. West from Old Rampart to Wiseman, upper Kobuk River near Shungnak, also Squirrel River, to Kaltag on Yukon River and to Elim at base of Seward Peninsula, South to Stony River on Kuskokwim River, Lake Clark, and Iliamna, and reported from Naknek at base of Alaska Peninsula . Spruce wood has been used to make shoehorns, skates, snowshoes and boot insoles.
- Alder Alnus spp. (cuukvaguaq sg cuukvaguak dual cuukvaguat pl, auguqsuli ~ auguqsuliq, caarilluk, caarin in Yup'ik and Cup'ik, cukvagguar in Cup'ig) species of Yup'ik regions are only mountain and thinleaf alders. The mountain alder or American green alder (Alnus viridis subsp. crispa) widely distributed in interior Alaska north to Colville River, north slopes of Brooks Range, Firth, Porcupine, Yukon, Koyukuk, Kobuk, and Noatak Rivers, and west to Bering Sea; south to Bethel and Alaska Range and southward in Susitna and Copper River Valleys, locally beyond. The Thinleaf alder (Alnus incana subsp. tenuifolia) Interior Alaska from Yukon River Valley west to mouth of Yukon River, south to Bethel on Kuskokwim River, and base of Alaska Peninsula at Katmai, and east to Kenai Peninsula and Copper River Valley. Also north end of southeast Alaska from Juneau to Haines. Additionally, the bark of alders is used to dye boots and clothing made from animal skin, particularly wolverine or seal skin. Red color red ochre dye (kavirun in Yup'ik) obtained from the inner bark of alders. The bitter part of the alder inner bark as tannin (tumagaq in Yup'ik) was removed and added to the water to make dye. After the water became dark, the skin was put into it to dye it. The cungagaq is alder inner bark dye applied to reduce shrinkage and the cungagartaq is dyed leather piece used to decorate sewn items.
- Grasses (canek sg can'gek dual can'get pl or (e)vek sg evgek ~ veg'ek dual evget ~ veg'et pl in Yup'ik, evek in Cup'ik, caneg in Cup'ig) are used as insoles for fish skin boots, kuspuks, mitterns, also snow goggles. This dried grass used for insoles known as piinerkaq. Fish skin mittens (arilluuk) with grass liners used for kayak travel during spring in bad weather. Grass kuspuk used to keep a person warm and dry. The boots were lined with grass in the bottom and were worn with woven grass socks. Grass boot liners (alliqsiik) which both insulated feet and wicked away moisture to keep them dry and warm.
- Coarse seashore grass or coarse grass, dune grass, beach grass Leymus mollis subsp. mollis (taperrnaq sg taperrnak dual taperrnat pl in Yup'ik and Cup'ik, taperrnar in Cup'ig) Yup’ik people use the leaves extensively to make mittens, socks, mats, and baskets. In former times, men wore grass socks and folded grass insoles inside their water boots; in cold weather sealskin socks were worn. Coarse grass, gathered in October, was used for insoles.

== Western-style clothing ==
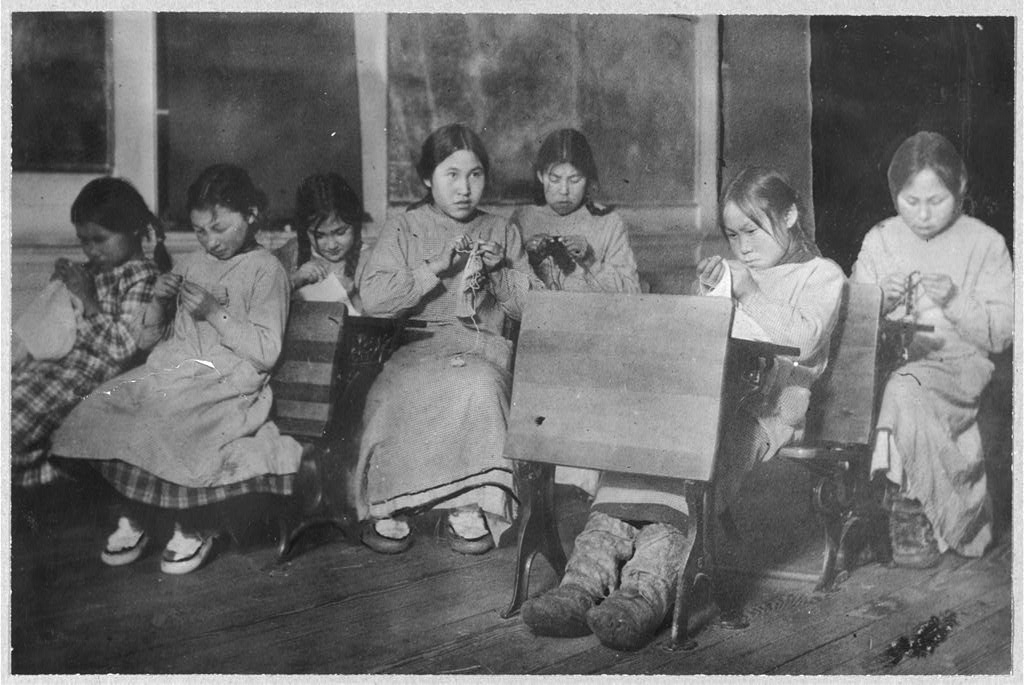
Yup'ik Eskimo children learning to sew (western-style) in a U.S. government school in Alaska, sometime between 1900-1930

The Russian colonization of the Americas by the Russian Empire covers the period from 1732 to 1867. As the runs from Siberia to America became longer expeditions, the crews established hunting and trading posts of the Shelikhov-Golikov Company (later formed the basis for the Russian-American Company). By the late 1790s, these had become permanent settlements of the Russian America (1799-1867). Colonization of Russian America by Russians was very limited. During the years 1799–1867, the number of Russians averaged 550 persons. There were never more than 823 Russians in the colony. Until about 1819, Russian settlement and activity was largely confined to the Aleutian Islands, the Pribilof Islands, Kodiak Island, and to scattered coastal locations on the mainland. Approximately half of the fur traders were Russians such as promyshlenniki from various European parts of the Russian Empire or from Siberia. Russia's sustained presence in Russian Alaska, from the arrival of the first Russians in 1732 until the transfer of the territory into United States possession, had a profound impact on the region's cultural landscape.

Before the arrival of the Russian fur traders (promyshlennikis), caribou and beaver skins were used for traditional clothing but subsequently, the Eskimos were persuaded to sell most furs and substitute manufactured materials. The Russians encouraged the Eskimos to adopt Western-style dress in order to release more furs for trading.

The Russian borrowings or loanwords used in Yup’ik language date from the period of the Russian America: malagg'aayaq (Yukon-Kuskokwim Yup'ik) palagg'aayaq (Unaliq-Pastuliq Yup'ik) palagg'aayar (Nunivak Cup'ig) paallaguaq (Egegik Yup'ik) "fur hat with large ear-flaps" from Russian малаха́й (malakháy); esslaapaq ~ ess'laapaq ~ selapaq ~ cillapak "broad-brimmed hat" from Russian шля́па (shlyápa); kaapaq ~ kaapaaq ~ kaupaq ~ kaupaaq "beaded hairnet worn by married Russian Orthodox women" from Russian ка́пор (kápor) "poke bonnet"; kaapcelaaq "primer cap" from Russian ка́псуль (kápsul’); kantiluq "cap with visor" from Russian кондырь (kondýr’); tackaq "woman’s beaded hairnet" perhaps from Russian се́тка (sétka) "net"; lavtak "material for skin-boot soles, the yellowish skin of the bearded seal (maklak) prepared by removing the black outer layer of skin" from Siberian Russian лафта́к (lafták) "dressed hide of sea mammal"; sap’akiq ~ cap’akiq "shoe; manufactured boot" from Russian сапоги́ (sapogí) "shoes"; pasmakiq ~ masmakiq "store-bought shoe" from Russian ба́шмаки (báshmaki) "shoes"; suukiiq ~ cuukiiq "sock" from Russian чулки́ (chulkí); kamliikaq "waterproof jacket used with kayak; parka" from Russian камле́йка (kamléyka); llumarraq ~ lumarraq ~ numarraq "shirt; cloth; dress; nightwear" from Russian руба́ха (rubákha); paltuuk ~ pal’tuuk "coat; zippered parka; jacket" from Russian пальто́ (pal’tó); saaliq "vest" from Russian шаль (shal’) "shawl"; sumpaq "jacket" from Russian шу́ба (shúba); yuupkaaq "slip; petticoat" from Russian ю́бка (yúpka) "skirt"; ciitsaaq, ciitessaaq "lightweight cotton cloth" from Russian си́тец (sítets); tulvaaq, tulvaarraq "heavy cloth; denim" from Russian то́левый "roofing felt".

Today, many Yup'ik have adopted western-style clothing.

== See also ==
- Yupiit Piciryarait Cultural Center
- Lena Atti, a Yup’ik artist expert in weaving grass in the old tradition
