= Yup'ik =

Indigenous people of Alaska

Yupʼik, Cupʼig, Cupʼik (Central Alaskan Yupʼik)
Total population
- 34,000 (2010 U.S. Census)

Regions with significant populations
- United States (Alaska): 34,000

Languages
- Yupʼik (and dialects: Cupʼik, Cupʼig), English

Religion
- Christianity (Moravian Protestant, Catholic, Russian Orthodox) and Native

Related ethnic groups
- Siberian Yupik, Sugpiaq/Alutiiq, Naukan, Iñupiat, Inuit, Aleut

The Yupʼik or Yupiaq (singular and plural) and Yupiit or Yupiat (plural), also Central Alaskan Yupʼik, Central Yupʼik, Alaskan Yupʼik (own name Yupʼik sg Yupiik dual Yupiit pl; Russian: Юпики центральной Аляски), are an Indigenous people of western and southwestern Alaska ranging from southern Norton Sound southwards along the coast of the Bering Sea on the Yukon-Kuskokwim Delta (including living on Nelson and Nunivak Islands) and along the northern coast of Bristol Bay as far east as Nushagak Bay and the northern Alaska Peninsula at Naknek River and Egegik Bay. They are also known as Cupʼik by the Chevak Cupʼik dialect-speaking people of Chevak and Cupʼig for the Nunivak Cupʼig dialect-speaking people of Nunivak Island.

The Yupiit are the most numerous of the various Alaska Native groups and speak the Central Alaskan Yupʼik language, a member of the Eskimo–Aleut family of languages. As of the 2010 U.S. Census, the Yupiit population in the United States numbered over 34,000 people, of whom over 22,000 lived in Alaska. The vast majority of these live in the seventy or so communities in the traditional Yupʼik territory of western and southwestern Alaska. About 10,000 speak the language. The Yupʼik had the greatest number of people who identified with one tribal grouping and no other race (29,000). In that census, nearly half of American Indians and Alaska Natives identified as being of mixed race.

Yupʼik, Cupʼik, and Cupʼig speakers can converse without difficulty, and the regional population is often described using the larger term of Yupʼik. They are one of the four Yupik peoples of Alaska and Siberia, closely related to the Sugpiaq ~ Alutiiq (Pacific Yupik) of south-central Alaska, the Siberian Yupik of St. Lawrence Island and Russian Far East, and the Naukan of Russian Far East.

The Yupʼik combine a contemporary and a traditional subsistence lifestyle in a blend unique to the Southwest Alaska. Today, the Yupʼik generally work and live in western style but still hunt and fish in traditional subsistence ways and gather traditional foods. Most Yupʼik people still speak the native language and bilingual education has been in force since the 1970s.

The neighbours of the Yupʼik are the Iñupiaq to the north, Aleutized Alutiiq ~ Sugpiaq to the south, and Alaskan Athabaskans, such as Yupikized Holikachuk and Deg Hitʼan, non-Yupikized Koyukon and Denaʼina, to the east.

== Naming ==
Originally, the singular form Yupʼik was used in the northern area (Norton Sound, Yukon, some Nelson Island) while the form Yupiaq was used in the southern area (Kuskokwim, Canineq [around Kwigillingok, Kipnuk, Kongiganak, and Chefornak], Bristol Bay). Certain places (Chevak, Nunivak, Egegik) have other forms: Cupʼik, Cupʼig, and Tarupiaq.

The form Yupʼik is now used as a common term (though not replacing Cupʼik and Cupʼig). Yupʼik comes from the Yupʼik word yuk, meaning 'person', plus the postbase -pik (or -piaq), meaning 'real' or 'genuine'; thus, Yupʼik literally means 'real person'. The ethnographic literature sometimes refers to the Yupʼik people or their language as Yuk or Yuit. In the Hooper Bay-Chevak and Nunivak dialects of Yupʼik, both the language and the people are given the name Cupʼik.

The use of an apostrophe in the name Yupʼik, compared to Siberian Yupik, exemplifies Central Yupʼik orthography: "The apostrophe represents gemination [or lengthening] of the 'p' sound."

'Person/People (Human Being)' and Ethnic Self-Name in Yupʼik Dialects
Dialect	Singular	Dual	Plural	Singular	Dual	Plural
Norton Sound (Unaliq-Pastuliq)	yuk	yuuk	yuut (< yuuget) ~ yugʼet	Yupʼik	Yupiik	Yupiit
General Central Yupʼik (Yugtun)	yuk	yuuk	yuut (< yuuget) ~ yugʼet	Yupiaq	Yupiak	Yupiat
Chevak (Cugtun)	cuk	cuugek	cuuget	Cupʼik	Cupiik	Cupiit
Nunivak (Cugtun)	cug	cuug	cuuget	Cupʼig	Cupiig	Cupiit
Egegik	taru ~ taruq			Tarupiaq	Tarupiak	Tarupiat

The following are names given to them by their neighbors.

- Alutiiq ~ Sugpiaq: Pamanaʼrmiuʼaq (Northern Kodiak), Pamanirmiuq (Southern Kodiak)
- Deg Xinag Athabaskan: Dodz xitʼan [lit. 'downriver people'], Novogh xitʼan [lit. 'coast people']
- Holikachuk Athabaskan: Namagh hitʼan [lit. 'coast people']
- Iñupiaq: Uqayuiḷat
- Koyukon Athabaskan: Nobaagha hutʼaankkaa [lit. 'coast people']
- Denaʼina Athabaskan: Dutna, Naghelghazhna
- Upper Kuskokwim Athabaskan: sg. Dodina, pl. Dodinayu

== History ==
=== Origins ===
The common ancestors of the Yupik and the Aleut (as well as various Paleo-Siberian groups) are believed by archaeologists to have their origin in eastern Siberia. Migrating east, they reached the Bering Sea area about 10,000 years ago. Research on blood types and linguistics suggests that the ancestors of American Indians reached North America in waves of migration before the ancestors of the Eskimo and Aleut; there were three major waves of migration from Siberia to the Americas by way of the Bering land bridge. This causeway became exposed between 20,000 and 8,000 years ago during periods of glaciation.

By about 3,000 years ago the progenitors of the Yupiit had settled along the coastal areas of what would become western Alaska, with migrations up the coastal rivers—notably the Yukon and Kuskokwim—around 1400 C.E., eventually reaching as far upriver as Paimiut on the Yukon and Crow Village (Tulukarugmiut) on the Kuskokwim.

For centuries, the Yup'ik had fought amongst each other in the Bow and Arrow Wars. According to oral traditions, they may have begun a thousand or 300 years ago, with various different theories as to how the wars begun. Yup'ik tribes constantly raided each other and destroyed villages. The excavation site of a Yup'ik village, Nunalleq, indicates that it was burned down sometime in the seventeenth century. These wars ultimately ended in the 1830s and 1840s with the establishment of Russian colonialism.

Before a Russian colonial presence emerged in the area, the Aleut and Yupik spent most of their time sea-hunting animals such as seals, walruses, and sea lions. They used mainly wood, stone, or bone weapons and had limited experience fishing. Families lived together in large groups during the winter and split up into smaller huts during the summer.

=== United States colonization ===
The United States purchased Alaska from the Russian Empire on March 30, 1867. Originally organized as the Department of Alaska (1867–1884), the area was renamed as the District of Alaska (1884–1912) and the Territory of Alaska (1912–1959) before it was admitted to the Union as the State of Alaska (1959–present).

During the Early American Period (1867–1939), the federal government generally neglected the territory, other than using positions in territorial government for political patronage. There was an effort to exploit the natural resources in the years following the purchase of Alaska. Moravian Protestant (1885) and Jesuit Catholic (1888) missions and schools were established along the Kuskokwim and lower Yukon rivers, respectively. The Qasgiq, ceremonial buildings for Yup'ik men, disappeared due to missionary coercion. During the early American period, native languages were forbidden in mission schools, where only English was permitted.

The economy of the islands also took a hit under American ownership. Hutchinson, Cool & Co., an American trading company, took advantage of its position as the only trader in the area and charged the natives as much as possible for its goods. The combination of high costs and low hunting and fishing productivity persisted until the Russo-Japanese war cut off contact with Russia.

The Alaska Native Claims Settlement Act (ANCSA) was signed into law on December 18, 1971. The ANCSA is central to both Alaska's history and current Alaska Native economies and political structures.

=== Historiography ===
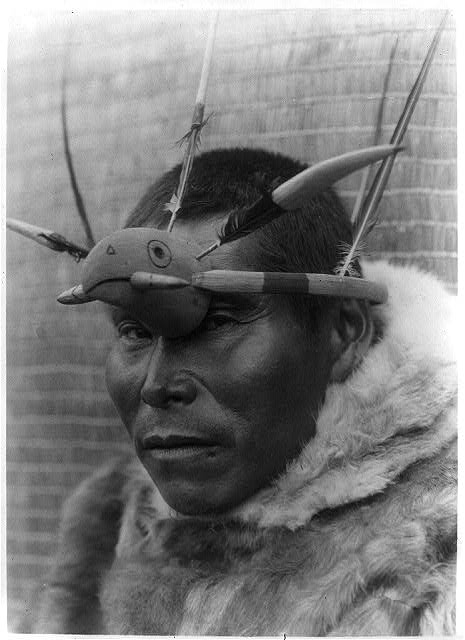
A Nunivak Island Cupʼig man in 1929

Before European contact (until the 1800s), the history of the Yupʼik, like that of other Alaska Natives, was oral tradition. Each society or village had storytellers (qulirarta) who were known for their memories, and those were the people who told the young about the group's history. Their stories (traditional legends qulirat and historical narratives qanemcit) express crucial parts of Alaska's earliest history.

The historiography of the Yupʼik ethnohistory, as a part of Eskimology, is slowly emerging. The first academic studies of the Yupʼik tended to generalize all "Eskimo" cultures as homogeneous and changeless.

While the personal experiences of non-natives who visited the Indigenous people of what is now called Alaska formed the basis of early research, by the mid-20th century archaeological excavations in southwestern Alaska allowed scholars to study the effects of foreign trade goods on 19th-century Eskimo material culture. Also, translations of pertinent journals and documents from Russian explorers and the Russian-American Company added breadth to the primary source base. The first ethnographic information about the Yupʼik of the Yukon-Kuskokwim Delta was recorded by the Russian explorer Lieutenant Lavrenty Zagoskin, during his explorations for the Russian-American Company in 1842–1844.

The first academic cultural studies of southwestern Alaskan Indigenous people were developed only in the late 1940s. This was due in part to a dearth of English-language documentation, as well as competition in the field of other subject areas. American anthropologist Margaret Lantis (1906–2006) published The Social Culture of the Nunivak Eskimo in 1946; it was the first complete description of any Alaskan indigenous group. She began Alaskan Eskimo Ceremonialism (1947) as a broad study of Alaskan Indigenous people. James W. VanStone (1925–2001), an American cultural anthropologist, and Wendell H. Oswalt were among the earliest scholars to undertake significant archaeological research in the Yupʼik region. VanStone demonstrates the ethnographic approach to cultural history in Eskimos of the Nushagak River: An Ethnographic History (1967). Wendell Oswalt published a comprehensive ethnographic history of the Yukon–Kuskokwim delta region, the longest and most detailed work on Yupʼik history to date in Bashful No Longer: An Alaskan Eskimo ethnohistory, 1778–1988 (1988). Ann Fienup-Riordan (born 1948) began writing extensively about the Yukon-Kuskokwim Indigenous people in the 1980s; she melded Yupʼik voices with traditional anthropology and history in an unprecedented fashion.

The historiography of western Alaska has few Yupʼik scholars contributing writings. Harold Napoleon, an elder of Hooper Bay, presents an interesting premise in his book Yuuyaraq: The Way of the Human Being (1988). A more scholarly, yet similar, treatment of cultural change can be found in Angayuqaq Oscar Kawagley's A Yupiaq Worldview: a Pathway to Ecology and Spirit (2001), which focuses on the intersection of Western and Yupʼik values.

== Yuuyaraq ==
Yuuyaraq or Way of life (yuuyaraq sg yuuyarat pl in Yupʼik, cuuyaraq in Cupʼik, cuuyarar in Cupig) is the term for the Yupʼik way of life as a human being. The expression encompasses interactions with others, subsistence or traditional knowledge, environmental or traditional ecological knowledge, and understanding, indigenous psychology, and spiritual balance.

Yuuyaraq defined the correct way of thinking and speaking about all living things, especially the great sea and land mammals on which the Yupʼik relied for food, clothing, shelter, tools, kayaks, and other essentials. These great creatures were sensitive; they were believed able to understand human conversations, and they demanded and received respect. Yuuyaraq prescribed the correct method of hunting and fishing and the correct way of handling all fish and game caught by the hunter in order to honor and appease the spirits and maintain a harmonious relationship with the fish and game. Although unwritten, this way can be compared to Mosaic law because it governed all aspects of a human being's life.

=== Elders ===
An Alaska Native elder (tegganeq sg tegganrek dual tegganret pl in Yupʼik, teggneq sg teggnerek ~ teggenrek dual teggneret ~ teggenret pl in Cupʼik, taqnelug in Cupʼig) is a respected elder. The elder is defined as an individual who has lived an extended life, maintains a healthy lifestyle, and has a wealth of cultural information and knowledge. The elder has expertise based upon know-how and provides consultation to the community and family when needed. Traditionally, knowledge was passed down from the elders to the youth through storytelling. A naucaqun is a lesson or reminder by which the younger generation learns from the experience of the elders.

Tegganeq is derived from the Yupʼik word tegge- meaning "to be hard; to be tough". Yupʼik discipline is different from Western discipline. The discipline and authority within Yupʼik child-rearing practices have at their core respect for the children.

More recently, elders have been invited to attend and present at national conferences and workshops. Elders-in-residence is a program that involves elders in teaching and curriculum development in a formal educational setting (oftentimes a university), and is intended to influence the content of courses and the way the material is taught.

== Society ==
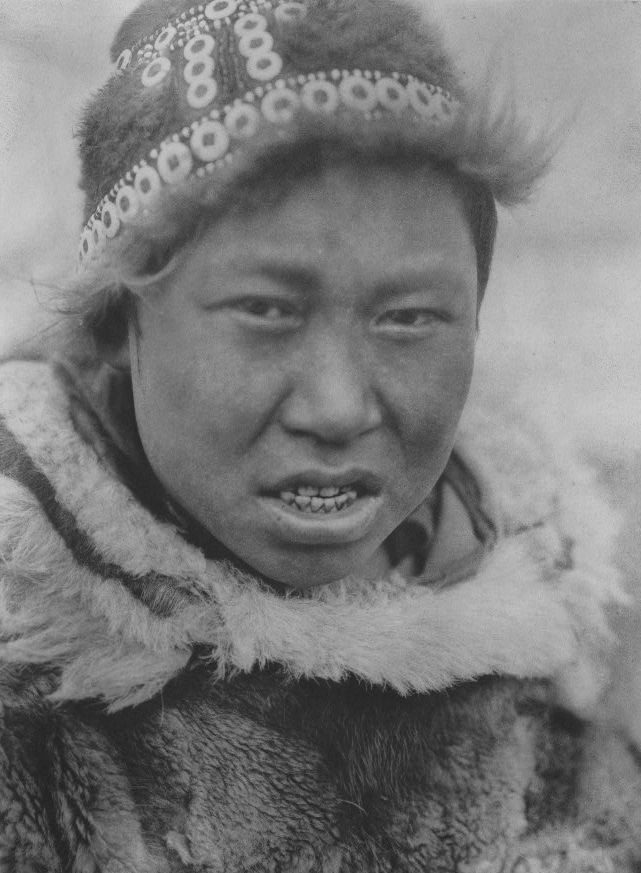
A Hooper Bay Askinarmiut boy poses wearing a circular cap (uivqurraq) and fur parka, photograph by Edward S Curtis (1930).

=== Kinship ===
The Yupʼik kinship is based on what is formally classified in academia as an Eskimo kinship or lineal kinship. This kinship system is bilateral and a basic social unit consisting of from two to four generations, including parents, offspring, and parents' parents. Kinship terminologies in the Yupʼik societies exhibit a Yuman type of social organization with bilateral descent, and Iroquois cousin terminology. Bilateral descent provides each individual with his or her own unique set of relatives or kindred: some consanguineal members from the father's kin group and some from the mother's, with all four grandparents affiliated equally with the individual. Parallel cousins are referenced by the same terms as siblings, and cross cousins are differentiated. Marriages were arranged by parents. Yupʼik societies (regional or socio-territorial groups) were shown to have a band organization characterized by extensive bilaterally structured kinship with multifamily groups aggregating annually.

=== Community ===
The Yupʼik created larger settlements in winter to take advantage of group subsistence activities. Villages were organized in certain ways. Cultural rules of kinship served to define relationships among the individuals of the group. Villages ranged in size from just two to more than a dozen sod houses (ena) for women and girls, one (or more in large villages) qasgiq for men and boys, and warehouses.

=== Leadership ===
Formerly, social status was attained by successful hunters who could provide food and skins. Successful hunters were recognized as leaders by members of the social group. Although there were no formally recognized leaders, informal leadership was practiced by or in the men who held the title Nukalpiaq ("man in his prime; successful hunter and good provider"). The nukalpiaq, or good provider, was a man of considerable importance in village life. This man was consulted in any affair of importance affecting the village in general, particularly in determining participation in the Kevgiq and Itruka'ar ceremonies. He was said to be a major contributor to those ceremonies and provider to orphans and widows.

The position of the nukalpiaq was not, however, comparable to that of the umialik (whaling captain) of northern and northwestern Alaska Iñupiaq. The captain had the power to collect the surplus of the village and much of the basic production of individual family members and later redistribute it.

=== Residence ===
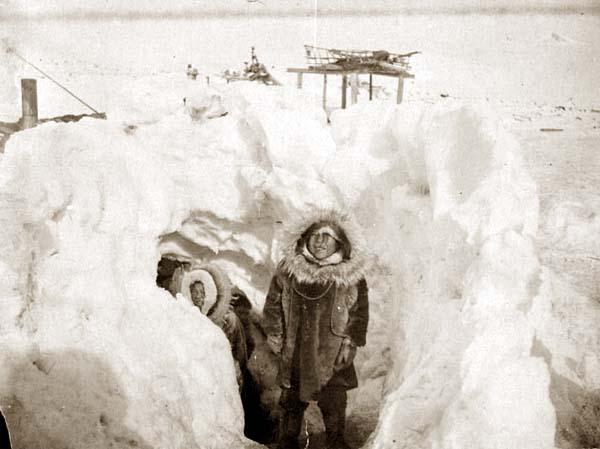
Qasgiq entry in the Yupʼik village of Stebbins (Tapraq), 1900

Traditionally, in the winter the Yupʼik lived in semi-permanent subterranean houses, with some for the men and others for the women (with their children). The Yupʼik men lived together in a larger communal house (qasgiq), while women and children lived in smaller, different sod houses (ena). Although the men and women lived separately, they had many interactions. Depending on the village, qasgiq and ena were connected by a tunnel. Both qasgiq and ena also served as schools and workshops for young boys and girls. Among the Akulmiut, the residential pattern of separate houses for women and children and a single residence for men and boys persisted until about 1930.

The women's house or Ena ([e]na sg nek dual net pl in Yupʼik, ena sg enet pl in Cupʼik, ena in Cupʼig) was an individual or semi-communal smaller sod house. They looked similar in construction to the qasgiqs but were only about half the size. Women and children lived in houses that served as residences for two to five women and their children. Raising children was the women's responsibility until young boys left the home to join other males in the qasgiq to learn discipline and how to make a living. The ena also served as a school and workshop for young girls, where they could learn the art and craft of skin sewing, food preparation, and other important survival skills.

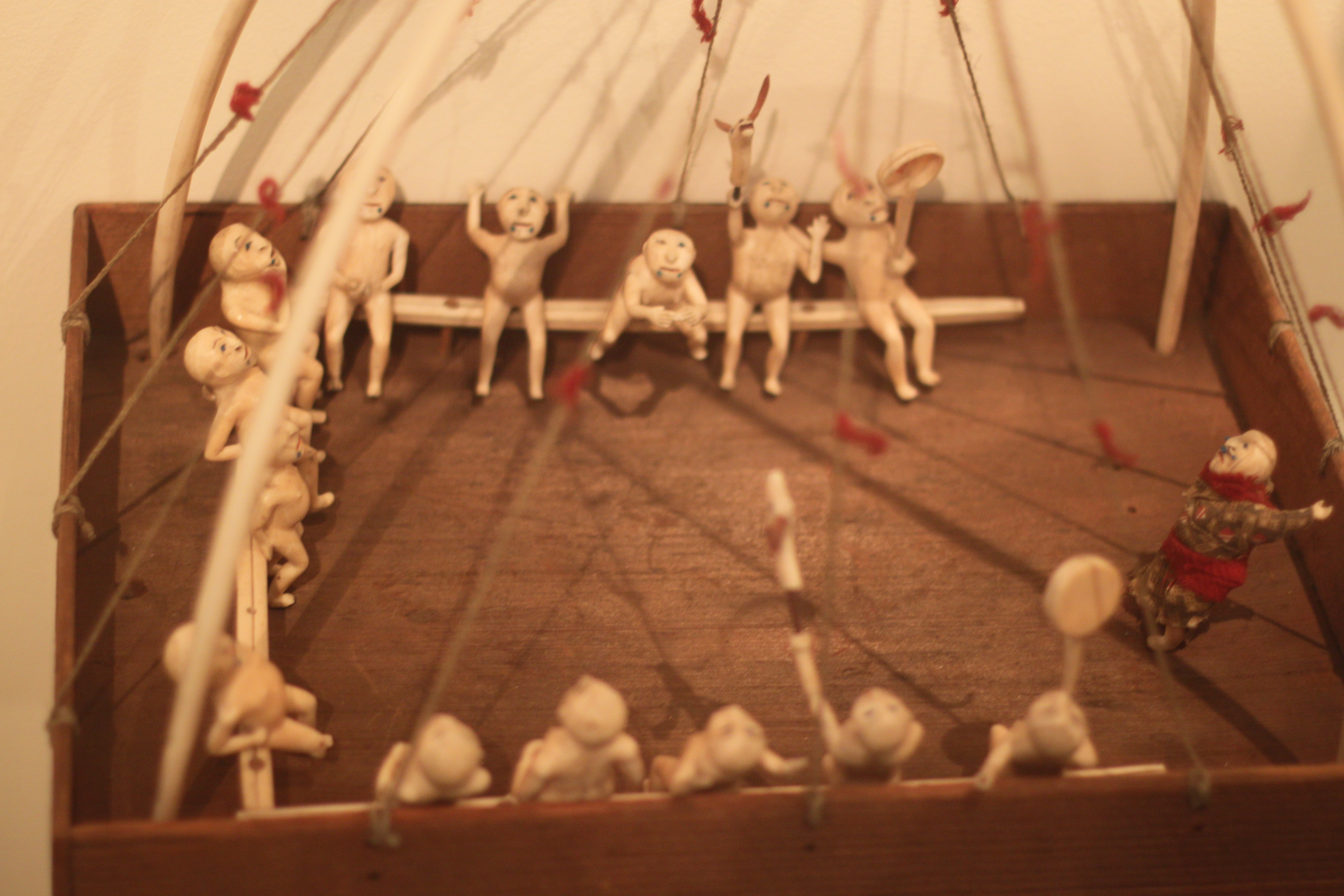
Wooden qasgiruaq (qasgiq model) with walrus ivory dolls. Ethnological Museum of Berlin.

Men's house or Qasgiq (is pronounced as "kaz-geek" and often referred to as kashigi, kasgee, kashim, kazhim, or casine in the old literature; qasgi ~ qasgiq sg qasgik dual qasgit pl in Yupʼik, qaygiq sg qaygit pl in Cupʼik, kiiyar in Cupʼig; qasgimi "in the qasgi") is a communal larger sod house. The qasgiq was used and occupied from November through March. The qasgiq housed all adult males in the community and male youth about seven years and older. The women prepared meals in their houses, known as ena. These were taken to the males in the qasgiq by young women and girls.

The qasgiq served as a school and workshop for young boys, where they could learn the art and craft of mask making, tool making, and kayak construction. It was also a place for learning hunting and fishing skills. At times, the men created a firebath, where hot fires and rocks produced heat to aid in body cleansing. Thus, the qasgiq was a residence, bathhouse, and workshop for all but the youngest male community members who still lived with their mothers. Although there were no formally recognized leaders or offices to be held, men and boys were assigned specific places within the qasgiq that distinguished the rank of males by age and residence. The qasgiq was a ceremonial and spiritual center for the community.

In primary villages, all ceremonies (and Yupʼik dancing) and gatherings (within and between villages among the socio-territorial and neighboring groups) took place in the qasgiq. During the early 20th century, Christian church services were held in the qasgiq before churches were constructed. Virtually all official business, within the group, between groups and villages, and between villagers and non-Yupʼik (such as early missionaries) was conducted in the qasgiq.

The Yupʼik Eskimo did not live in igloos or snow houses. But, the northern and northwestern Alaskan Iñupiaq built snow houses for temporary shelter during their winter hunting trips. The word iglu means "house" in Iñupiaq. This word is the Iñupiaq cognate of the Yupʼik word ngel'u ("beaver lodge, beaver house"), which it resembled in shape.

=== Regional groups ===
Among the Yupʼik of southwestern Alaska, societies (regional or socio-territorial groups), like those of the Iñupiat of northwestern Alaska, were differentiated by territory, speech patterns, clothing details, annual cycles, and ceremonial life.

Prior to and during the mid-19th century, the time of Russian exploration and presence in the area, the Yupiit were organized into at least twelve, and perhaps as many as twenty, territorially distinct regional or socio-territorial groups (their native names will generally be found ending in -miut postbase which signifies "inhabitants of ..." tied together by kinship—hence the Yupʼik word tungelquqellriit, meaning "those who share ancestors (are related)". These groups included:

- Unalirmiut (Unaligmiut), inhabiting the Norton Sound area. The name derives from the Yupʼik word Unaliq, denoting a Yupʼik from the Norton Sound area, especially the north shore villages of Elim and Golovin and the south shore villages of Unalakleet and St. Michael. Unalirmiut were speakers of the Norton Sound Unaliq subdialect of Yupʼik.
- Pastulirmiut, inhabiting the mouth of the Yukon River. The name derives from Pastuliq, the name of an abandoned village of southern Norton Sound near the present-day village of Kotlik at one of the mouths of the Yukon River. The village name comes from the root paste- meaning to become set in a position (for instance, a tree bent by the wind). Pastulirmiut were speakers of the Norton Sound Kotlik subdialect of Yupʼik, and are also called pisalriit (sing. pisalria) denoting their use of this subdialect in which s is used in many words where other speakers of Yupʼik use y.
- Kuigpagmiut (Ikogmiut), inhabiting the Lower Yukon River. The name derives from Kuigpak, meaning "big river", the Yupʼik name for the Yukon River.
- Marayarmiut (Mararmiut, Maarmiut, Magemiut), inhabiting the Scammon Bay area. The name derives from Marayaaq, the Yupʼik name for Scammon Bay, which in turn derives from maraq, meaning "marshy, muddy lowland". Mararmiut, deriving from the same word, denotes flatland dwellers in general living between the mouth of the Yukon and Nelson Island.
- Askinarmiut, inhabiting the area of the present-day villages of Hooper Bay and Chevak. Askinarmiut is an old name for the village of Hooper Bay. (DCED).
- Qaluyaarmiut (Kaialigamiut, Kayaligmiut), inhabiting Nelson Island. The name derives from Qaluyaaq, the Yupʼik name for Nelson Island, which derives in turn from qalu, meaning "dipnet". In the Qaluuyaaq, there are three villages. Those villages are Toksook bay, Nightmute, and Tununak.
- Akulmiut, inhabiting the tundra or "Big Lake" area north of the Kuskokwim River. The name denotes people living on the tundra—as opposed to those living along the coastline or major rivers—such as in the present-day villages of Nunapitchuk, Kasigluk, or Atmautluak. The name derives from akula meaning "midsection", "area between", or "tundra".
- Caninermiut, inhabiting the lower Bering Sea coast on either side of Kuskokwim Bay, including the area north of the bay where the modern-day villages of Chefornak, Kipnuk, Kongiganak, Kwigillingok are located and south of the bay where the villages of and Eek and Quinhagak are located (Goodnews Bay?). The name derives from canineq, meaning "lower coast", which derives in turn from the root cani, "area beside".
- Nunivaarmiut (Nuniwarmiut, Nuniwagamiut), inhabiting Nunivak Island. The name derives from Nunivaaq, the name for the island in the General Central dialect of Yupʼik. In the Nunivak dialect of Yupʼik (that is, in Cupʼig), the island's name is Nuniwar and the people are called Nuniwarmiut.
- Kusquqvagmiut (Kuskowagamiut), inhabiting the Lower and middle Kuskokwim River. The name derives from Kusquqvak, the Yupʼik name for the Kuskokwim River, possibly meaning "a big thing (river) with a small flow". The Kusquqvagmiut can be further divided into two groups:
  - Unegkumiut, inhabiting the Lower Kuskokwim below Bethel to its mouth in Kuskowkim Bay. The word derives from unegkut, meaning "those downriver"; hence, "downriver people".
  - Kiatagmiut, inhabiting inland regions in the upper drainages of the Kuskowkim, Nushagak, Wood, and Kvichak river drainages. The word derives probably from kiani, meaning "inside" or "upriver"; hence, "upriver people". The Kiatagmiut lived inland along the Kuskokwim River drainage from the present location of Bethel to present-day Crow Village and the vicinity of the 19th-century Russian outpost Kolmakovskii Redoubt. By the mid-19th century, many Kiatagmiut had migrated to the drainage of the Nushagak River.
- Tuyuryarmiut (Togiagamiut), inhabiting the Togiak River area. The word derives from Tuyuryaq, the Yupʼik name for the village of Togiak.
- Aglurmiut (Aglegmiut), inhabiting the Bristol Bay area along the Lower Nushagak River and the northern Alaska Peninsula. The word derives from agluq, meaning "ridgepole" or "center beam of a structure".

While Yupiit were nomadic, the abundant fish and game of the Y-K Delta and Bering Sea coastal areas permitted for a more settled life than for many of the more northerly Iñupiaq people. Under normal conditions, there was little need for interregional travel, as each regional group had access to enough resources within its own territory to be completely self-sufficient. However, fluctuations in animal populations or weather conditions sometimes necessitated travel and trade between regions.

== Economy ==
=== Hunting-gathering ===
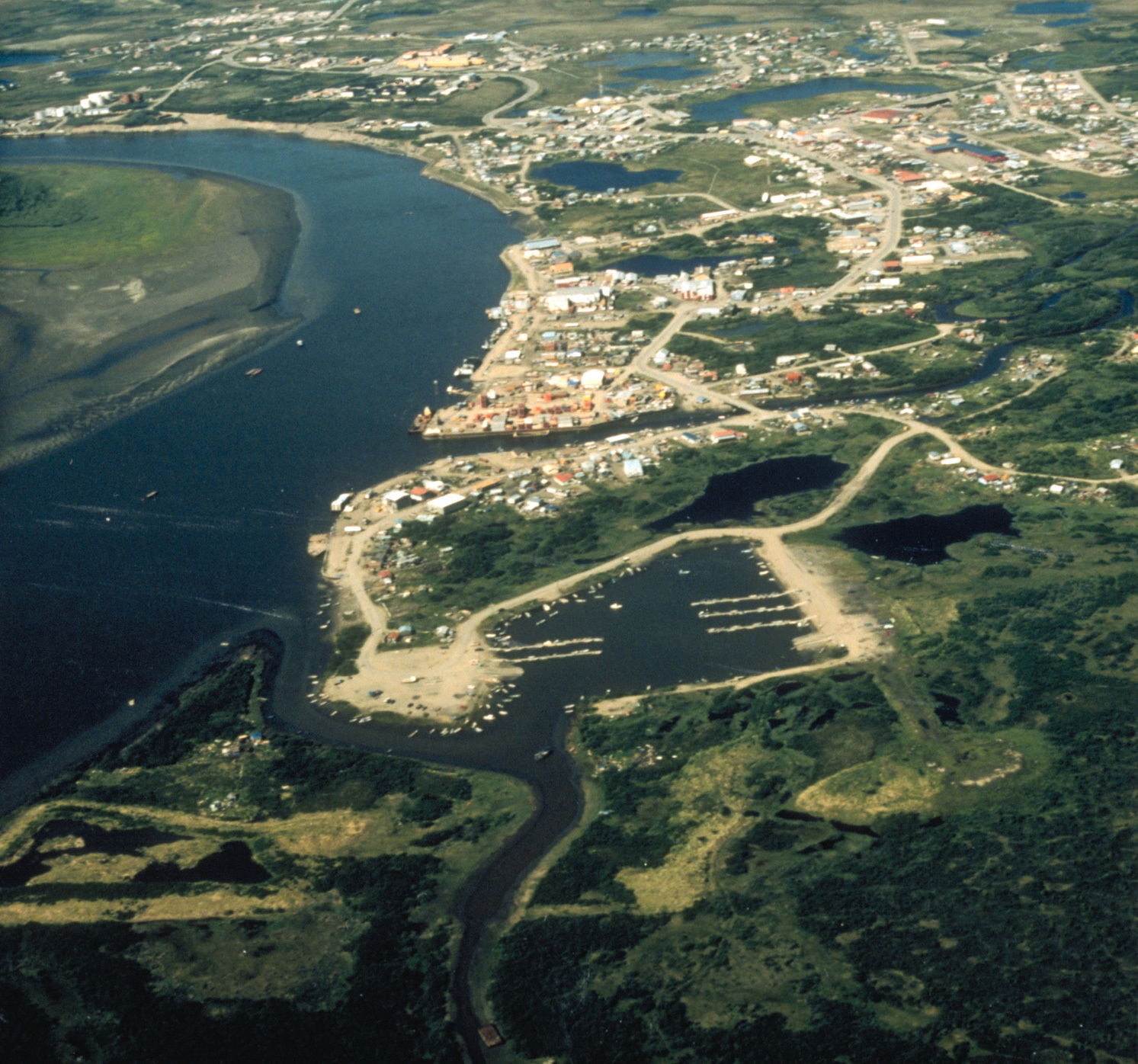
Aerial view of Bethel on the Kuskokwim River. Bethel (Mamterilleq) is the regional hub of Yupʼik homeland.

The homeland of Yupʼik is the Dfc climate type subarctic tundra ecosystem. The land is generally flat tundra and wetlands. The area covers about 100,000 square miles which are roughly about 1/3 of Alaska. Their lands are located in five of the 32 ecoregions of Alaska:

Before European contact, the Yupʼik, like other neighboring Indigenous groups, were semi-nomadic hunter-fisher-gatherers who moved seasonally throughout the year within a reasonably well-defined territory to harvest sea and land mammals, fish, bird, berry and other renewable resources. The economy of Yupʼik is a mixed cash-subsistence system, like other modern foraging economies in Alaska. The primary use of wild resources is domestic. Commercial fishing in Alaska and trapping patterns are controlled primarily by external factors.

On the coast, in the past as in the present, to discuss hunting was to begin to define a man. In Yupʼik, the word anqun (man) comes from the root angu- (to catch after chasing; to catch something for food) and means, literally, a device for chasing.

Northwest Alaska is one of the richest Pacific salmon areas in the world, with the world's largest commercial Alaska salmon fishery in Bristol Bay.

Coastal Togiak subregion (Manokotak, Twin Hills, Togiak, Goodnews Bay, Platinum) annual hunting-gathering cycle (1985) usual harvest occasional harvest
Resource	Jan	Feb	Mar	Apr	May	Jun	Jul	Aug	Sep	Oct	Nov	Dec
King salmon catching												
Red salmon catching												
Silver salmon catching												
Dolly Varden catching												
Whitefish catching												
Smelt catching												
Pike catching												
other freshwater fish catching												
Moose hunting												
Caribou hunting												
Brown bear hunting												
Harbor seal hunting												
Bearded & Ringed seal hunting												
Sea lion hunting												
Porcupine hunting												
Hare & Rabbit hunting												
Beaver trapping												
River otter trapping												
Red fox trapping												
Parky squirrel trapping												
other furbearers trapping												
Ducks & Geese hunting												
Ptarmigan hunting												
Bird eggs gathering												
Clams & Mussels gathering												
Berry picking												
Basket grass gathering												

=== Trade ===
In the Nome Census Area, Brevig Mission, an Iñupiaq community, tended to trade with other Iñupiaq communities to the north: Shishmaref, Kotzebue, and Point Hope. The Yupʼik communities (Elim, Stebbins and St. Michael), tended to trade with Yupʼik communities to the south: Kotlik, Emmonak, Mountain Village, Pilot Station, St. Mary's of the Kusilvak Census Area.

=== Transportation ===
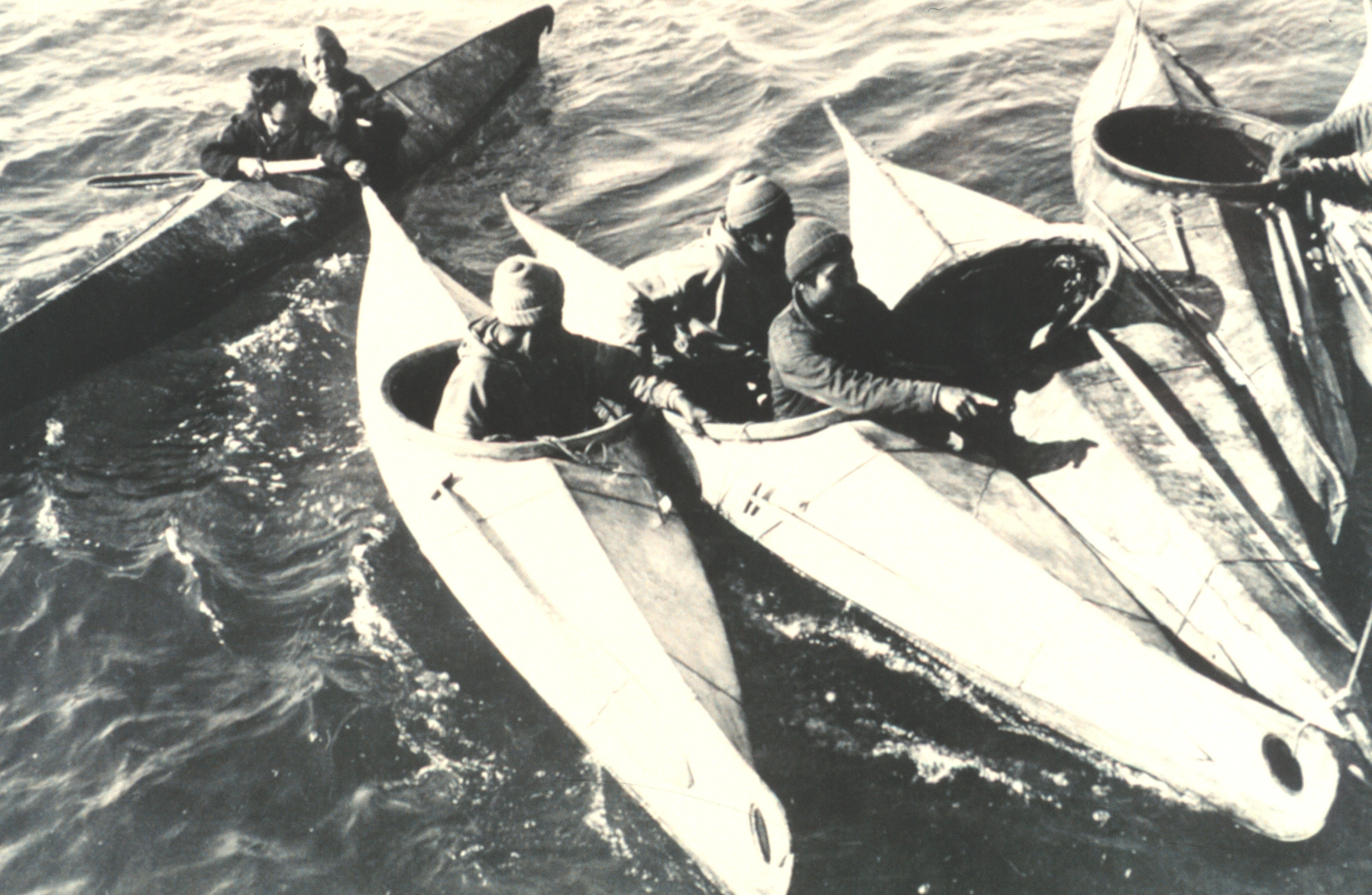
Nunivak kayaks, August 1936

Traditionally, transportation was primarily by dog sleds (land) and kayaks (water). Sea mammal hunting and fishing in the Bering Sea region took place from both small narrow closed skin-covered boats called kayaks and larger broad open skin-covered boats called umiaks. Kayaks were used more frequently than umiaks. Traditionally, kayaking and umiaking served as water transportation and sea hunting. Dog sleds are ideal for land transportation. Pedestrian transportation is on foot in summer and snowshoes in winter. Only small local road systems exist in Southwest Alaska. Only a few closely adjacent villages are linked by roads. Today, snowmobile or snowmachine travel is a critical component of winter transport; an ice road for highway vehicles is used along portions of the Kuskokwim River.

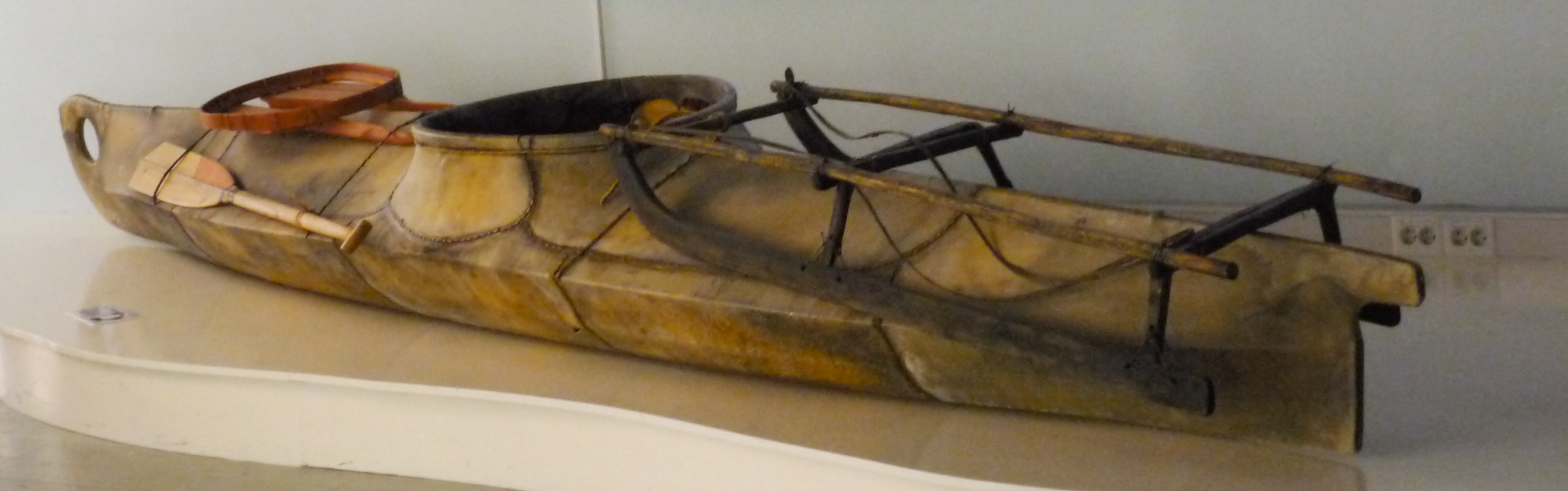
This kayak appears to be built in the Nunivak Island style. Collection of the Arktikum Science Museum in Rovaniemi, Finland.

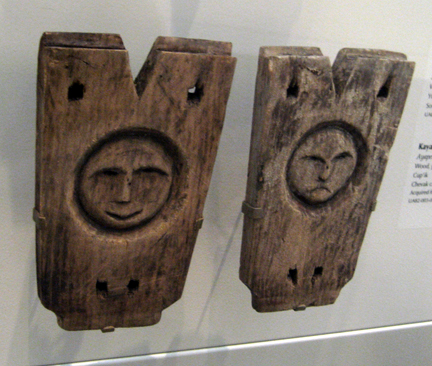
Nunivak Cupʼig kayak cockpit stanchions (ayaperviik). The smiling face of a man and the frowning face of a woman grace these pieces from a kayak frame. Collection of the University of Alaska Museum of the North

The kayak (qayaq sg qayak dual qayat pl in Yupʼik and Cupʼik, qayar ~ qay'ar sg qay'ag dual qay'at ~ qass'it pl in Cupʼig; from qai- "surface; top")) is a small narrow closed skin-covered boat and was first used by the native speakers of the Eskimo–Aleut languages. The Yupʼik used kayaks for seal hunting, fishing, and general transportation. The Yupʼik people considered a kayak the owner's most prized possession. Traditionally, a kayak was a Yupʼik hunter's most prized possession and a symbol of manhood. It is fast and maneuverable, seaworthy, light, and strong. Kayak is made of driftwood from the beach, covered with the skin of a sea mammal, and sewn with sinew from another animal. Yupʼik kayaks are known from the earliest ethnographic reports, but there are currently no surviving full-size Yupʼik kayaks from the pre-contact period. The Yupʼik Norton Sound/Hooper Bay kayaks consisted of 5–6 young seal skins stretched for the covering. The Yupʼik style of seams contains a running stitch partially piercing the skin on top and an overlapping stitch on the inside with a grass insert. Caninermiut style Yupʼik kayak used in the Kwigillingok and Kipnuk regions and there are teeth marks in the wood of the circular hatch opening, made by the builders as they bent and curved the driftwood into shape.

Kayak stanchions or kayak cockpit stanchions (ayapervik sg ayaperviik dual ayaperviit pl or ayaperyaraq sg ayaperyarat pl in Yupʼik and Cupʼik, ayaperwig in Cupʼig) are top piece centered at the side of the coaming and used as support as one climbs out of a kayak. They prevented the person from falling while getting in and out of the kayak. All kayaks had ayaperviik on them. This one has a woman's frowning face with a down-turned mouth carved on it. Perhaps the other side would have a man's smiling face carved on it.

The umiak or open skin boat, large skin boat (angyaq sg angyak dual angyat pl in Yupʼik and Cupʼik, angyar in Cupʼig) is larger broad open skin-covered boat.

The dog sleds (ikamraq sg ikamrak dual ikamrat pl in Yupʼik and Cupʼik, qamauk in Yukon and Unaliq-Pastuliq Yupʼik, ikamrag, qamaug in Cupʼig; often used in the dual for one sled) are an ancient and widespread means of transportation for Northern Indigenous peoples, but when non-Native fur traders and explorers first traveled the Yukon River and other interior regions in the mid-19th century they observed that only Yupikized Athabaskan groups, including the Koyukon, Deg Hitʼan and Holikachuk, used dogs in this way. Both of these people had probably learned the technique from their Iñupiat or Yupʼik neighbors. Non-Yupikized Athabaskan groups, including the Gwichʼin, Tanana, Ahtna and other Alaskan Athabaskans pulled their sleds and toboggans by hand, using dogs solely for hunting and as pack animals.

== Culture ==
Yupʼik (as Yupʼik and Cupʼik) culture is one of five cultural groups of the Alaska Natives.

The Yupiit Piciryarait Cultural Center is a non-profit cultural center of the Yupʼik culture centrally located in Bethel near the University of Alaska Fairbanks' Kuskokwim Campus and city offices. The mission of the center is to promote, preserve and develop the traditions of the Yupʼik through traditional and non-traditional art forms of the Alaska Native art, including arts and crafts, performance arts, education, and Yupʼik language. The center also supports local artists and entrepreneurs.

=== Language and literature ===
==== Language ====
The Yupʼik speak four or five Yupik languages. The Yupʼik people constitute the largest ethnic group in Alaska and the Yupʼik languages are spoken by the largest number of native persons. Yupʼik, like all Northern Indigenous languages, is a suffixing language made up of noun and verb bases to which one or more postbases and a final ending or enclitics are added to denote such features as a number, case, person, and position. The Yupʼik category of number distinguishes singular, plural, and dual. Yupʼik does not have a category of gender and articles. The Yupʼik orthography currently used was developed at the University of Alaska Fairbanks in the 1960s by native speakers of Yupʼik elders working with linguists. The Yupʼik are among the most numerous of the various Alaska Natives. There are 10,400 speakers out of a population of 25,000, but the language was classified as threatened in 2007, according to Alaska Native Language Center.

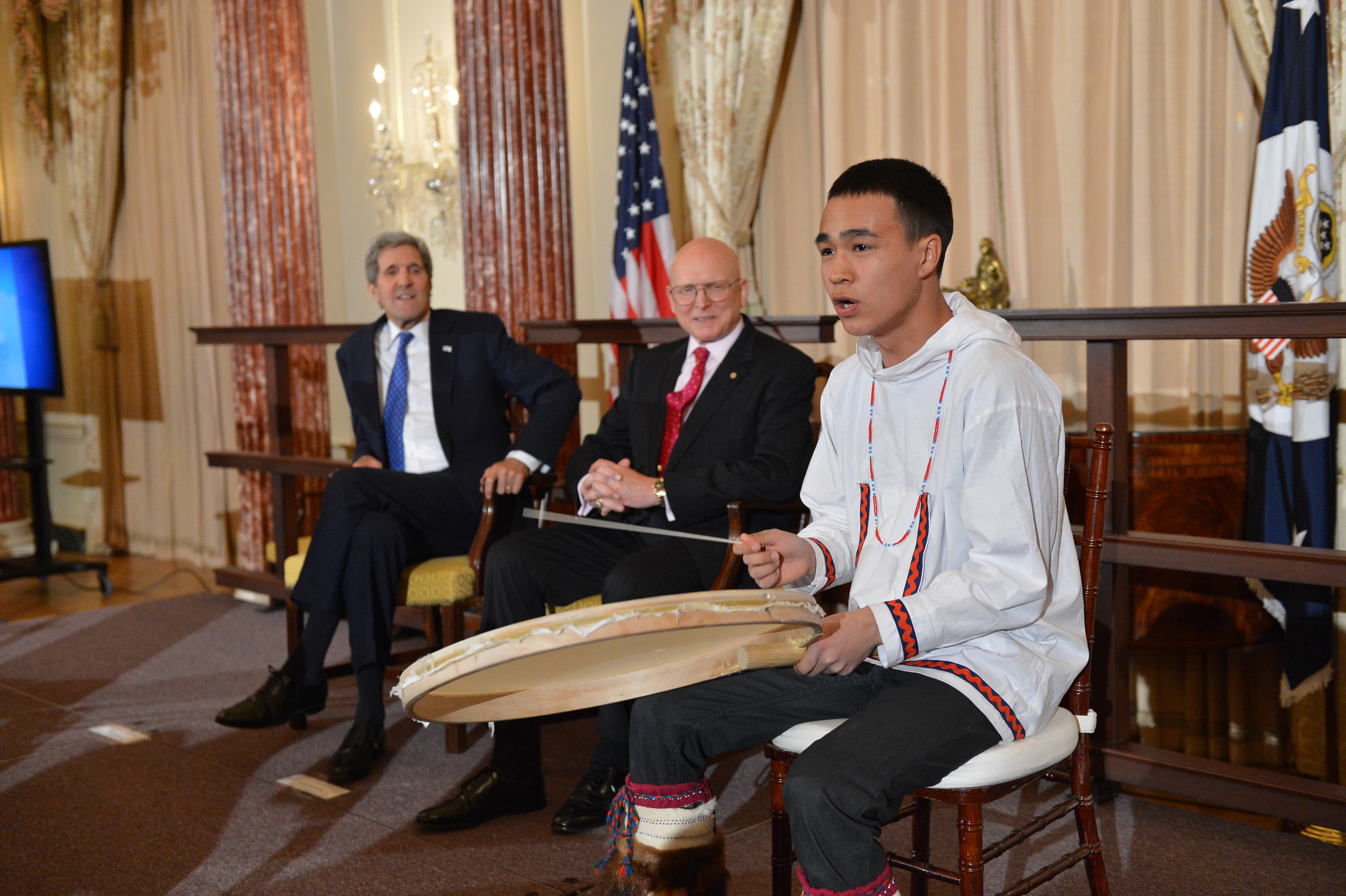
Byron Nicholai, a Yup'ik singer and dancer from Toksook Bay, performs to President Obama's cabinet.

It is a single well-defined language (now called Yupʼik or Yupʼik and Cupʼik) a dialect continuum with five major dialects: extinct Egegik (Aglegmuit-Tarupiaq), and living Norton Sound or Unaliq-Pastuliq dialect (two subdialects: Unaliq and Kotlik), General Central Yupʼik dialect (seven subdialects: Nelson Island and Stebbins, Nushagak River, Yukon or Lower Yukon, Upper or Middle Kuskokwim, Lake Iliamna, Lower Kuskokwim, and Bristol Bay), Hooper Bay-Chevak dialect (two subdialects: Hooper Bay Yupʼik and Chevak Cupʼik), and Nunivak Cupʼig dialect. Nunivak Island dialect (Cupʼig) is distinct and highly divergent from mainland Yupʼik dialects.

Population of the dialect-based main Yupʼik groups in 1980.
Yupʼik groups	Population	Speakers	Nonspeakers
General Central Yupʼik	13,702	9,622	9,080
Unaliq-Pastuliq	752	508	244
Hooper Bay-Chevak	1,037	959	78
Nunivak	153	92	61

Maintenance of the Eskimo-Aleut languages of Alaska (1980 and 1992) and their degree of viability (1992).
People and language	1980 population / speakers & percent	1992 population / speakers & percent	1992 viability
Siberian Yupik	1,000 / 1,050 95%	1,000 / 1,050 95%	spoken by most or all adults as well as all or most children
Central Yupʼik	17,000 / 14,000 80%	18,000 / 12,000 67%	spoken by most or all adults as well as all or most children & spoken by most adults but not by most children
Inupiaq	12,000 / 5,000 40%	13,000 / 4,000 31%	spoken by most adults but not by most children & spoken only by elder people (mainly those above 50 years of age)
Sugpiaq (Alutiiq)	3,000 / 1,000 33%	3,100 / 600 19%	spoken by most adults but not by most children & spoken only by elder people (mainly those above 50 years of age)
Aleut (Unangan)	2,200 / 700 35%	2,100 / 400 19%	spoken by most adults but not by most children & spoken only by elder people (mainly those above 50 years of age)

==== Education ====
Yupʼik was not a written language until the arrival of Europeans, the Russians, around the beginning of the 19th century. Pre-contact knowledge transfer and learning among Yupʼik people traditionally was through oral culture, with no written history or transcribed language. Children were taught about subsistence practices, culture, and social systems through stories, legends, toys, and examples of behavior.

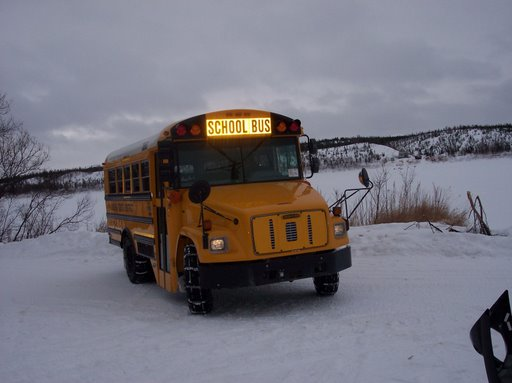
School bus at Crooked Creek, Alaska (Tevyaraq), March 5, 2008

The early schools for Alaska Natives were mostly church-run schools of the Russian Orthodox missions in Russian-controlled Alaska (1799–1867), and, after 1890, the Jesuits and Moravians, allowed the use of the Alaska Native languages in instruction in schools. However, in the 1880s, Presbyterian missionary Sheldon Jackson (1834–1909) began a policy of prohibiting Native languages in the mission schools he managed. When he became United States Commissioner of Education, he proposed a policy of prohibition of indigenous language use in all Alaskan schools. This policy came into full force in about 1910. From that time period until the passage of the Bilingual Education Act in 1968, children in Alaskan schools suffered severe treatment for speaking their Native languages in schools.

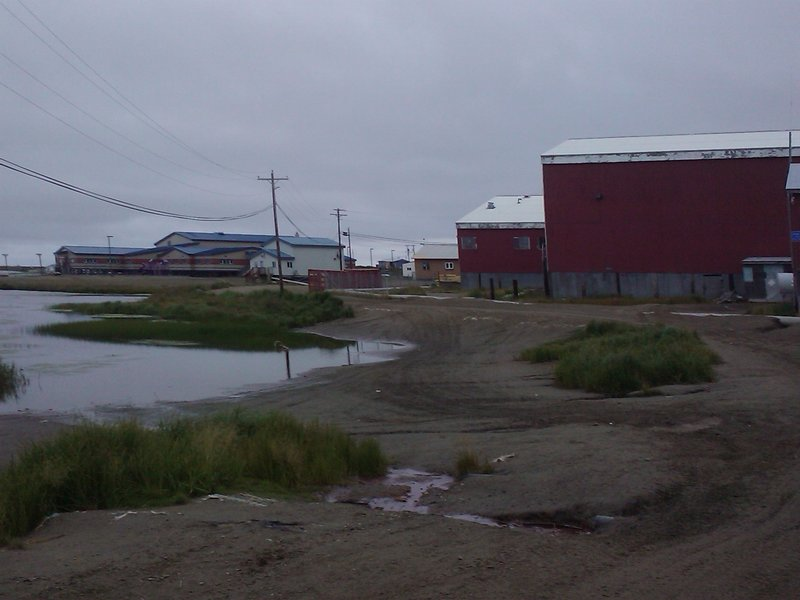
Chevak, Kashunamiut School District, the school (blue), lake, and condemned old school (red)

17 Yupʼik villages had adopted local elementary bilingual programs by 1973. In the 1980s and 1990s, Yupʼik educators became increasingly networked across village spaces. Between the early 1990s and the run of the century, students in Yupʼik villages, like youth elsewhere became connected to the Internet and began to form a "Yupʼik Worldwide Web". Through Facebook and YouTube, youth are creating new participatory networks and multimodal competencies.

Bilingualism is still quite common in Alaska today, especially among Native people who speak English in addition to their own language. All village schools are publicly funded by the state of Alaska. The school districts of the Yupʼik area:

- Lower Yukon School District (LYSD). English and Yupʼik bilingual education is done at these schools: Alakanuk, Emmonak, Hooper Bay, Ignatius Beans Memorial, Kotlik, Marshall, Pilot Station, Pitkas Point, Russian Mission, Scammon Bay, Nunam Iqua.
- Lower Kuskokwim School District (LKSD). English and Yupʼik (with Cupʼig at the Nunivak Island) bilingual education is done at these schools: Atmautluak, Akiuk-Kasigluk, Akula-Kasigluk, Ayaprun, BABS School, Bethel High School, Chefornak, EEK, Goodnews Bay, Gladys Jung, Kipnuk, Kongiganak, Kwethluk, Kwigillingok, M.E. School, Mekoryuk, Napakiak, Napaskiak, Newtok, Nightmute, Nunapitchuk, Oscarville, Platinum, Quinhagak, Toksook Bay, Tuntutuliak, Tununak, Pre-School.
- Yupiit School District (YSD) English and Yupʼik (with Cupʼig at the Nunivak Island) bilingual education is done at these schools: Akiachak, Akiak, Tuluksak
- Kashunamiut School District (KSD) is within the village of Chevak. English and Cupʼik bilingual education is done at this school.
- Kuspuk School District. English and Yupʼik bilingual education is done at these schools: Lower Kalskag, Kalskag, Aniak, Chuathbaluk, Crooked creek, Red Devil, Sleetmute, Stony River.
- Southwest Region School District (SWRSD). English and Yupʼik bilingual education are done at these schools: Aleknagik, Clarks Point, Ekwok, Koliganek, Manokotak, New Stuyahok, Togiak, Twin Hills

==== Literature ====
Yupʼik oral storytelling stories or tales are often divided into the two categories of Qulirat (traditional legends) and Qanemcit (historical narratives). In this classification then, what is identified as myth or fairytale in the Western (European) tradition is a quliraq, and a personal or historical narrative is a qanemciq.

- Traditional Legends (quliraq sg qulirat pl in Yupʼik and Cupʼik, qulirer in Cupʼig) are traditional Yupʼik legends or mythical tales that have been transmitted from generation to generation and often have supernatural elements. These traditional stories that have been handed down by word of mouth and involve fictional, mythical, legendary, or historical characters, or animals taking on human characteristics, told for entertainment and edification. Yupʼik family legends (ilakellriit qulirait) are oral stories that have been handed down through the generations within a certain family.
- Historical Narratives (qanemciq sg qanemcit pl or qanemci, qalamciq, qalangssak in Yupʼik and Cupʼik, qanengssi, univkangssi in Cupʼig) are a personal and historical Yupʼik narratives that can be attributed to an individual author, even though he or she has been forgotten.

The stories that previous generations of Yupʼik heard in the qasgi and assimilated as part of a life spent hunting, traveling, dancing, socializing, preparing food, repairing tools, and surviving from one season to the next. Yupʼik oral stories (qulirat and qanemcit) of the storytellers (qulirarta) were embedded in many social functions of the society. Storyknifing (yaaruilta literally "let's go story knife!") stories a traditional and still common activity of young girls and is told by children of all ages in the Yupʼik lands. These stories are illustrated by figures sketched on mud or snow with a ceremonial knife, known as a story knife or storytelling knife (yaaruin, saaruin, ateknguin, quliranguarrsuun in Yupʼik, qucgutaq in Cupʼik, igaruarun in Cupʼig). Story knives are made of wood (equaq is a wooden story knife) ivory or bone (cirunqaaraq is an antler story knife). In the Yupʼik storytelling tradition, an important aspect of traditional stories is that each listener can construct his or her own meaning from the same storytelling.

=== Art ===
The Yupʼik traditionally decorate almost all of their tools, even ones that perform smaller functions. Traditionally sculptures are not made for decoration. One of their most popular forms of the Alaska Native art is the Yupʼik mask. They most often create masks for ceremonies but the masks are traditionally destroyed after being used. These masks are used to bring the person wearing them luck and good fortune in hunts. Other art forms, including Yupʼik clothing, and Yupʼik dolls are the most popular.

==== Clothing ====
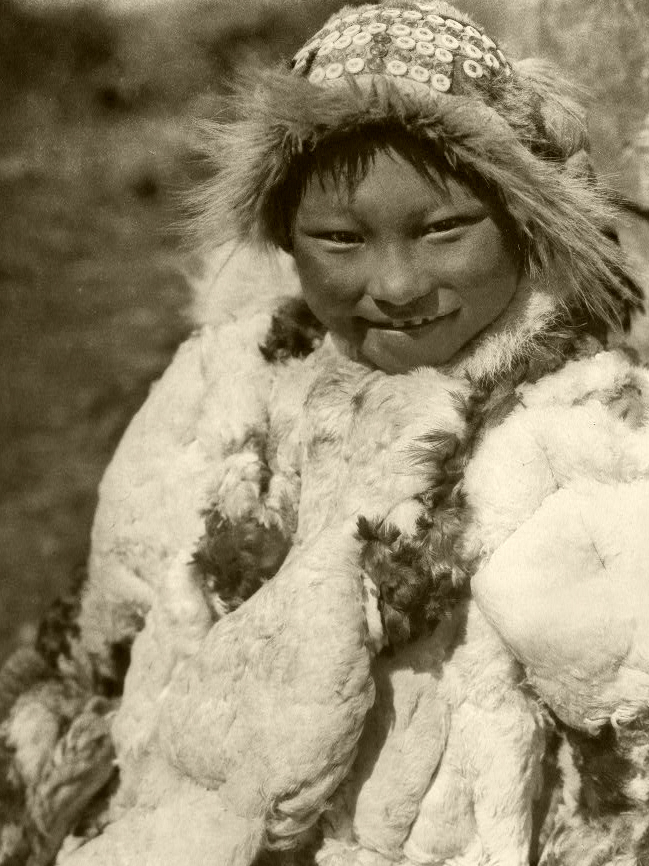
Nunivak Cupʼig child wearing bird skin clothing (parka?) and wood knot-like beaded circular cap (uivqurraq), photograph by Edward Curtis, 1930

The traditional clothing system developed and used by the Yupʼik and other Northern Indigenous peoples is the most effective cold-weather clothing developed to date. Yupʼik clothing tended to fit relatively loosely. Skin sewing is an artistic arena in which Yupʼik women and a few younger men excel. Yupʼik women made clothes and footwear from animal skins (especially hide and fur of marine and land mammals for fur clothing, sometimes birds, also fish), sewn together using needles made from animal bones, walrus ivory, and bird bones such as front part of a crane's foot and threads made from other animal products, such as sinew. The semilunar woman's knife ulu is used to process and cut skins for clothing and footwear. Women made most clothing of caribou (wild caribou Rangifer tarandus granti and domestic reindeer Rangifer tarandus tarandus) and sealskin. The English words kuspuk (parka cover or overshirt) and mukluk (skin boot) which is derived from the Yupʼik word qaspeq and maklak. Before the arrival of the Russian fur traders (promyshlennikis), caribou and beaver skins were used for traditional clothing but Northern Indigenous peoples were compelled to sell most of their furs to the Russians and substitute (inferior) manufactured materials. Everyday functional items like skin mittens, mukluks, and jackets are commonly made today, but the elegant fancy parkas (atkupiaq) of traditional times are now rare. Today, many Yupʼik have adopted western-style clothing.

==== Mask ====
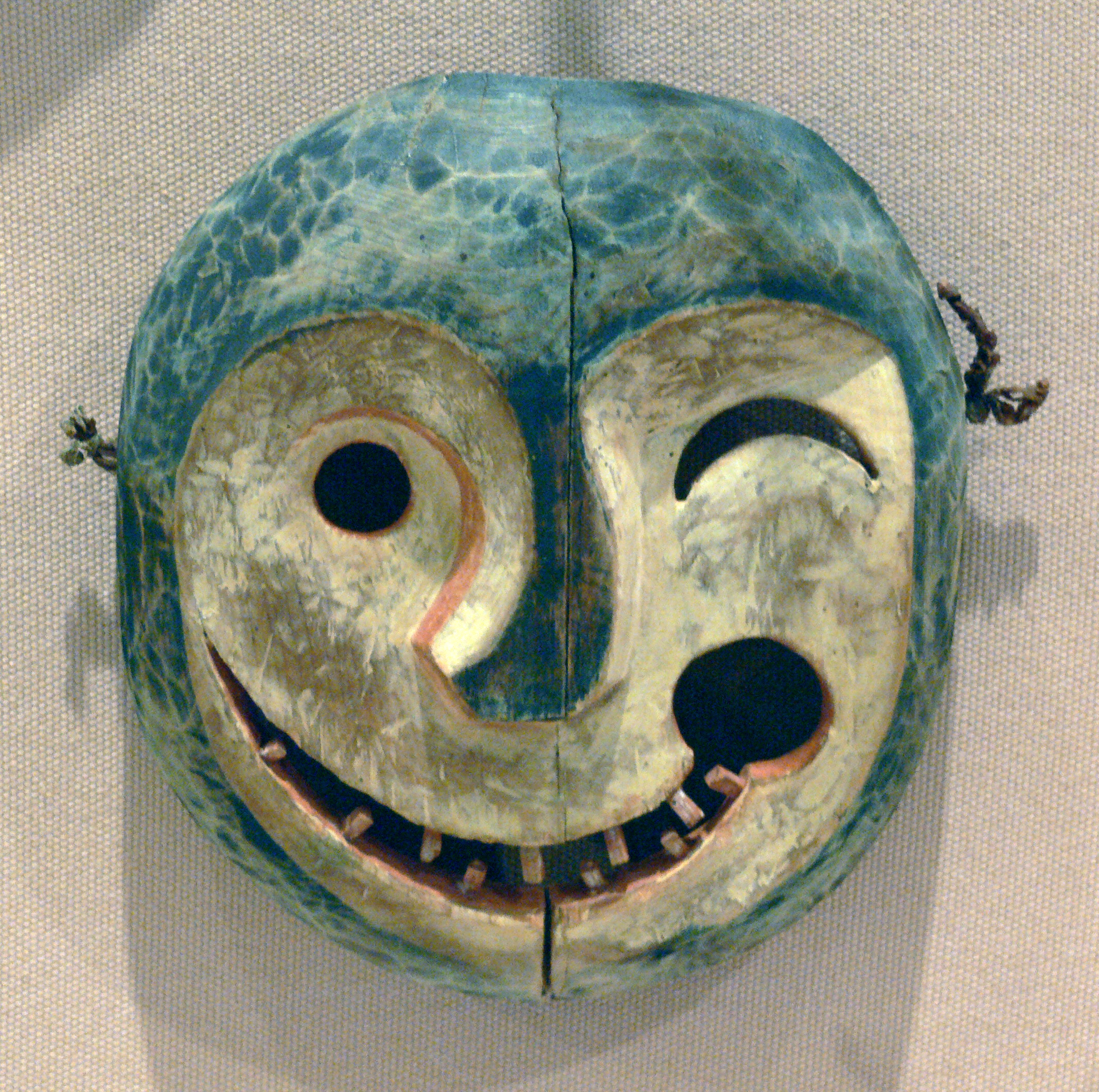
Yupʼik painted wood mask depicting the face of a tuunraq (keeper of the game), Yukon River area, late 19th century, Dallas Museum of Art, Dallas, Texas

Yupʼik masks (kegginaquq and nepcetaq in Yupʼik, agayu in Cupʼig) are expressive shamanic ritual masks. One of their most popular forms of the Alaska Native art is masks. The masks vary enormously but are characterized by the great invention. They are typically made of wood and painted with few colors. The Yupʼik masks were carved by men or women but mainly were carved by men. They most often create masks for ceremonies but the masks are traditionally destroyed after being used. After Christian contact in the late 19th century, masked dancing was suppressed, and today it is not practiced as it was before in the Yupʼik villages.

The National Museum of the American Indian, as a part of the Smithsonian Institution, provided photographs of Yupʼik ceremonial masks collected by Adams Hollis Twitchell, an explorer and trader who traveled Alaska during the Nome Gold Rush newly arrived in the Kuskokwim region, in Bethel in the early 1900s.

==== Music and dance ====
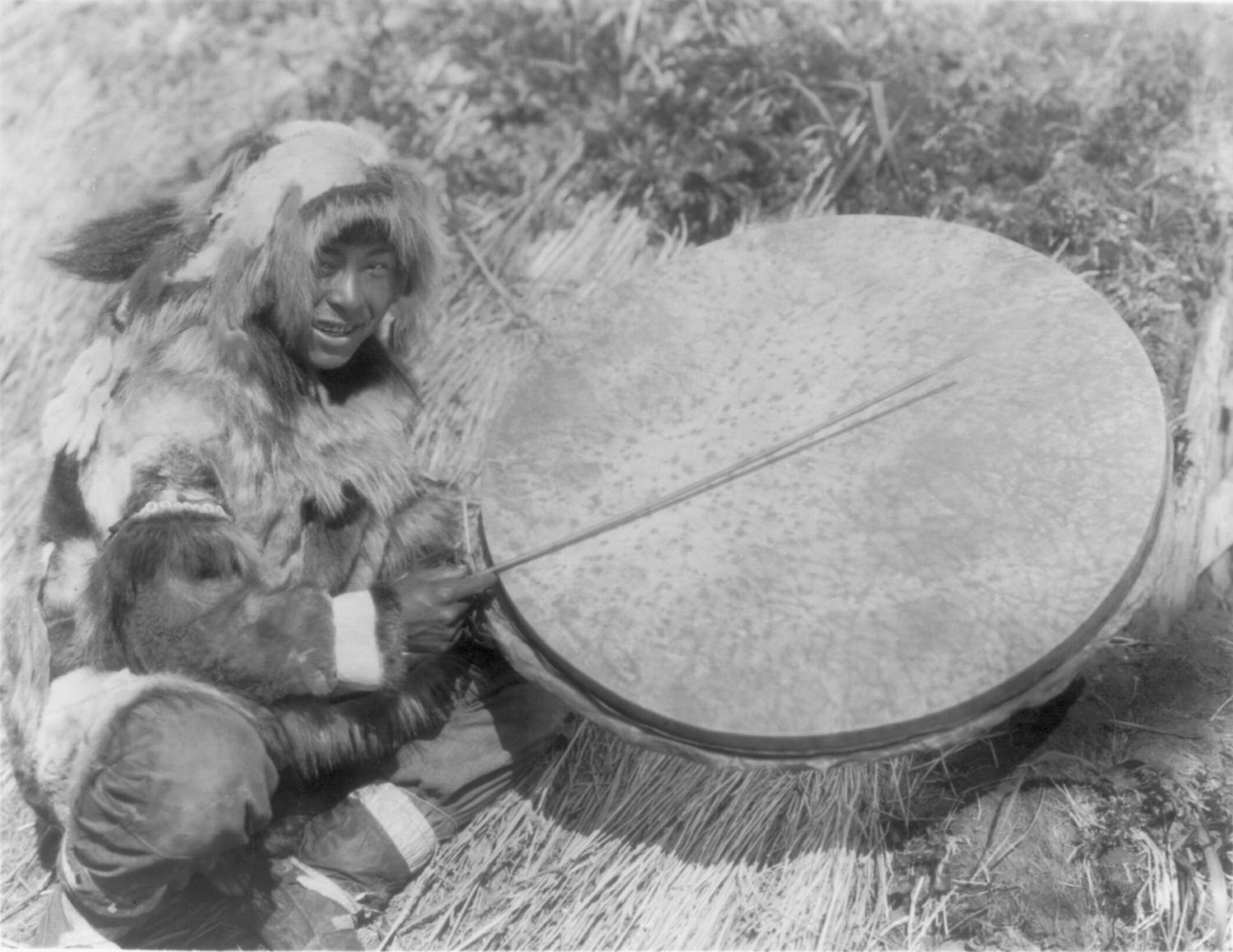
Nunivak Cupʼig man playing a very large drum (cauyaq) in 1927 photograph by Edward S Curtis

Yupʼik dancing (yuraq in Yupʼik) is a traditional form of dancing usually performed to songs in Yupʼik. Round drums cover with seal stomachs and played with wooden sticks of driftwood to provide a rhythmic beat. Both men and women choreograph the dances and sing in accompaniment. Typically, the men are in the front, kneeling and the women stand in the back. The drummers are in the very back of the dance group. The Yupʼik use dance fans (finger masks or maskettes, tegumiak)to emphasize and exaggerate arm motions. Dancing plays an important role in both the social and spiritual life of the Yupʼik community. The Yupʼik have returned to practicing their songs and dances, which are a form of prayer. Traditional dancing in the qasgiq is a communal activity in the Yupʼik tradition. Mothers and wives brought food to the qasgiq (men's house) where they would join in an evening of ceremonial singing and dancing. The mask was a central element in Yupʼik ceremonial dancing. There are dances for fun, social gatherings, exchange of goods, and thanksgiving. Yupʼik ways of dancing (yuraryaraq) embrace six fundamental key entities identified as ciuliat (ancestors), angalkuut (shamans), cauyaq (drum), yuaruciyaraq (song structures), yurarcuutet (regalia) and yurarvik (dance location). The Yuraq is used as a generic term for Yupʼik/Cupʼik regular dance. Also, yuraq is concerned with animal behavior and hunting of animals or with the ridicule of individuals (ranging from affectionate teasing to punishing public embarrassment). But, used for inherited dance is Yurapik or Yurapiaq (lit. "real dance"). The dancing of their ancestors was banned by Christian missionaries in the late 19th century. After a century, the Cama-i dance festival is a cultural celebration that started in the mid-1980s with the goal to gather dancers from outlying villages to share their music and dances. There are now many groups that perform dances in Alaska. The most popular activity in the Yupʼik-speaking area is rediscovered Yupʼik dancing.

=== Yupik Dance Festivals ===
Every year, the Yupiit of the Qaluuyaaq (Nelson Island) and the surrounding villages of Nelson Island gather up every weekend in each village. Each village hosts a Yupik dance festival which they call the festival Yurarpak (you-rawr-puk).

The qelutviaq is a one-string fiddle or lute played by the Yupʼik of Nelson Island.

Drums of Winter or Uksuum Cauyai: Drums of Winter (1977) is an ethnographic documentary on the culture of the Yupʼik people, focusing primarily on dance, music, and potlatch traditions in the community of Emmonak, Alaska.

=== Toys and games ===
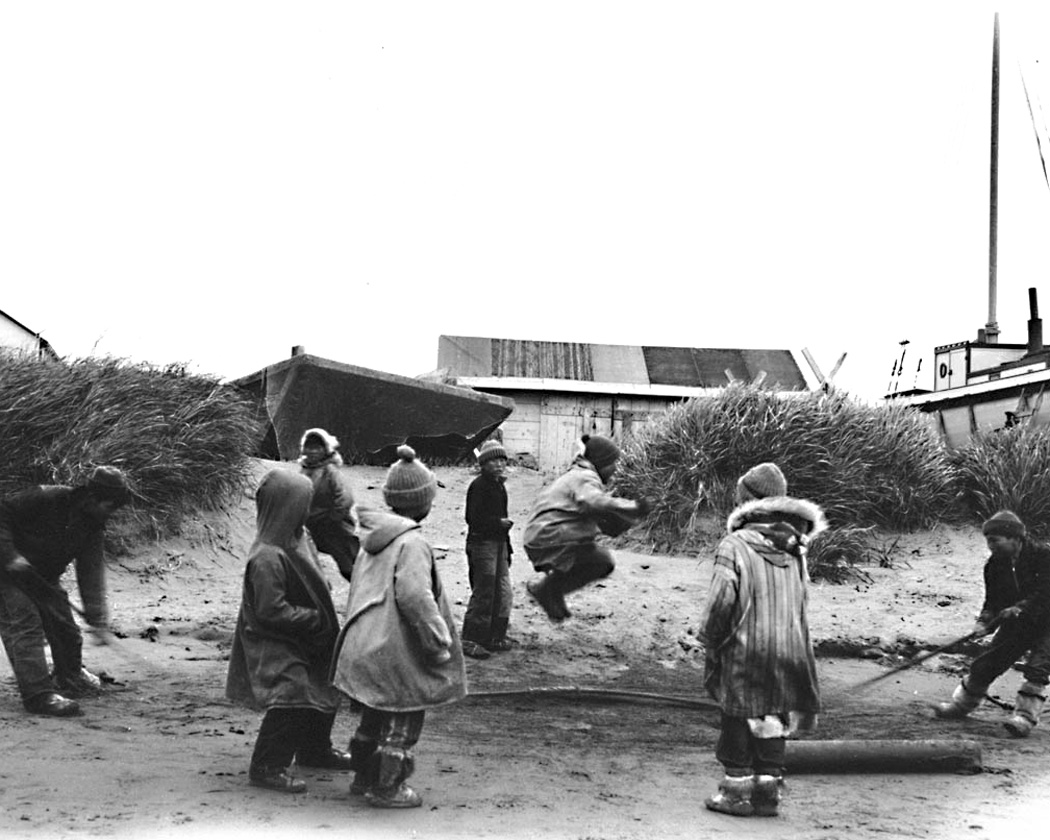
Nunivak Cupʼig children playing jump-rope (qawaliqtar in Cupʼig), 1940 or 1941

An Eskimo yo-yo or Alaska yo-yo is a traditional two-balled skill toy played and performed by the Eskimo-speaking Alaska Natives, such as Inupiat, Siberian Yupik, and Yupʼik. It resembles fur-covered bolas and yo-yo. It is regarded as one of the most simple, yet most complex, cultural artifacts/toys in the world. The Eskimo yo-yo involves simultaneously swinging two sealskin balls suspended on caribou sinew strings in opposite directions with one hand. It is popular with Alaskans and tourists alike.

==== Doll ====
Yupʼik dolls (yugaq, irniaruaq, sugaq, sugaruaq, suguaq in Yupʼik, cugaq, cugaruaq in Cupʼik, cuucunguar in Cupʼig) are dressed in traditional-style clothing, intended to protect the wearer from cold weather, and are often made from traditional materials obtained through food gathering. Play dolls from the Yupʼik area were made of driftwood, bone, or walrus ivory and measured from one to twelve inches in height or more. Some human figurines were used by shamans. Dolls also mediated the transition between childhood and adulthood in the Yupʼik shamanism.

=== Cuisine ===
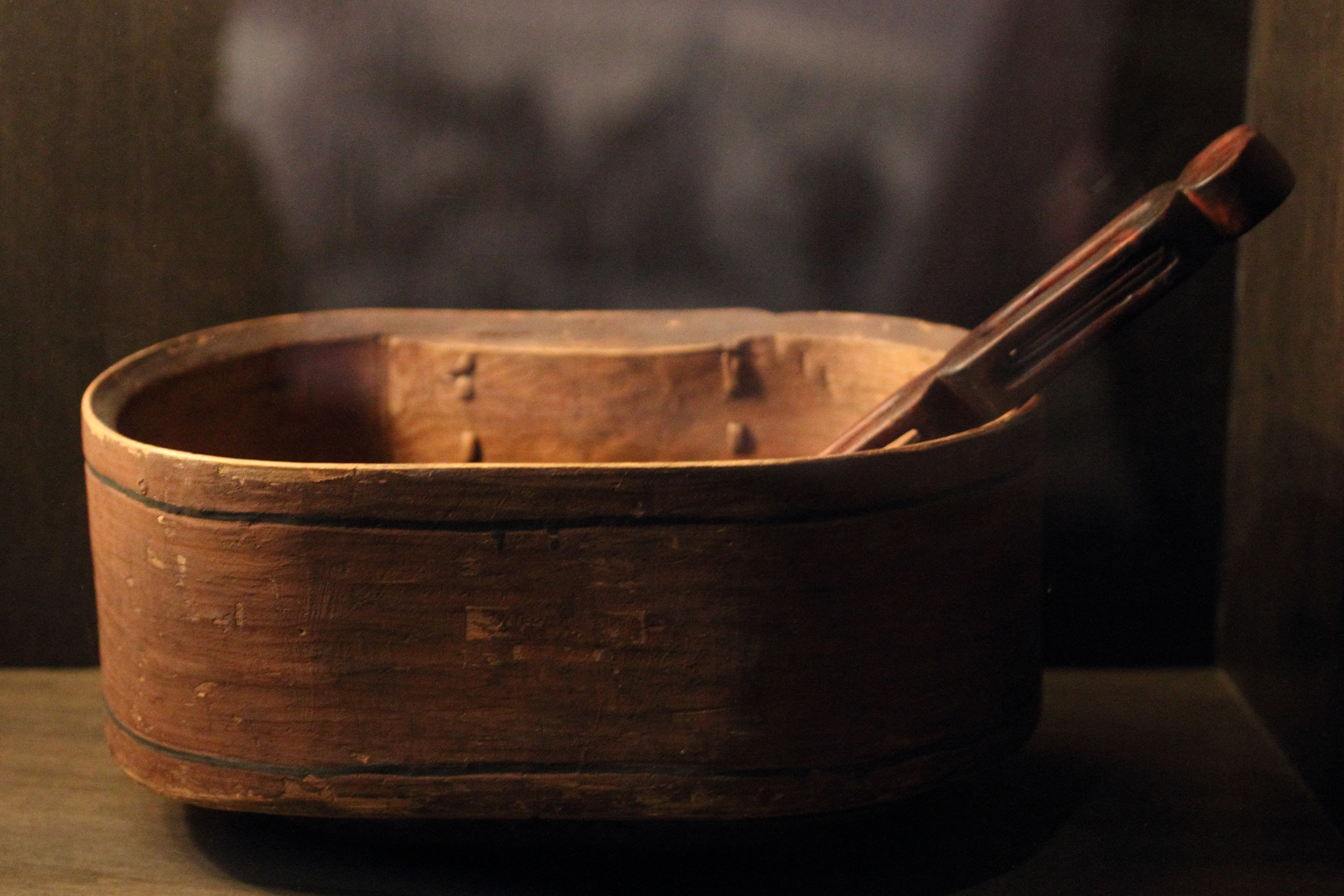
Tumnaq used to make Eskimo ice cream, circa 1910

Yupʼik cuisine is based on traditional subsistence food harvests (hunting, fishing, and berry gathering) supplemented by seasonal subsistence activities. The Yupʼik region is rich in waterfowl, fish, and sea and land mammals. Yupʼik settled where the water remained ice-free in winter, where walruses, whales, and seals came close to shore, and where there was a fishing stream or a bird colony nearby. Even if a place was not very convenient for human civilization, but had a rich game, Yupʼik would settle there. The coastal settlements rely more heavily on sea mammals (seals, walrusses, beluga whales), many species of fish (Pacific salmon, herring, halibut, flounder, trout, burbot, Alaska blackfish), shellfish, crabs, and seaweed. The inland settlements rely more heavily on Pacific salmon and freshwater whitefish, land mammals (moose, caribou), migratory waterfowl, bird eggs, berries, greens, and roots help sustain people throughout the region. Traditional subsistence foods are mixed with what is commercially available. Today about half the food is supplied by subsistence activities (subsistence foods), and the other half is purchased from commercial stores (market foods, store-bought foods).

Traditional Yupʼik delicacies is, akutaq (Eskimo ice cream), tepa (stink heads), mangtak (muktuk).

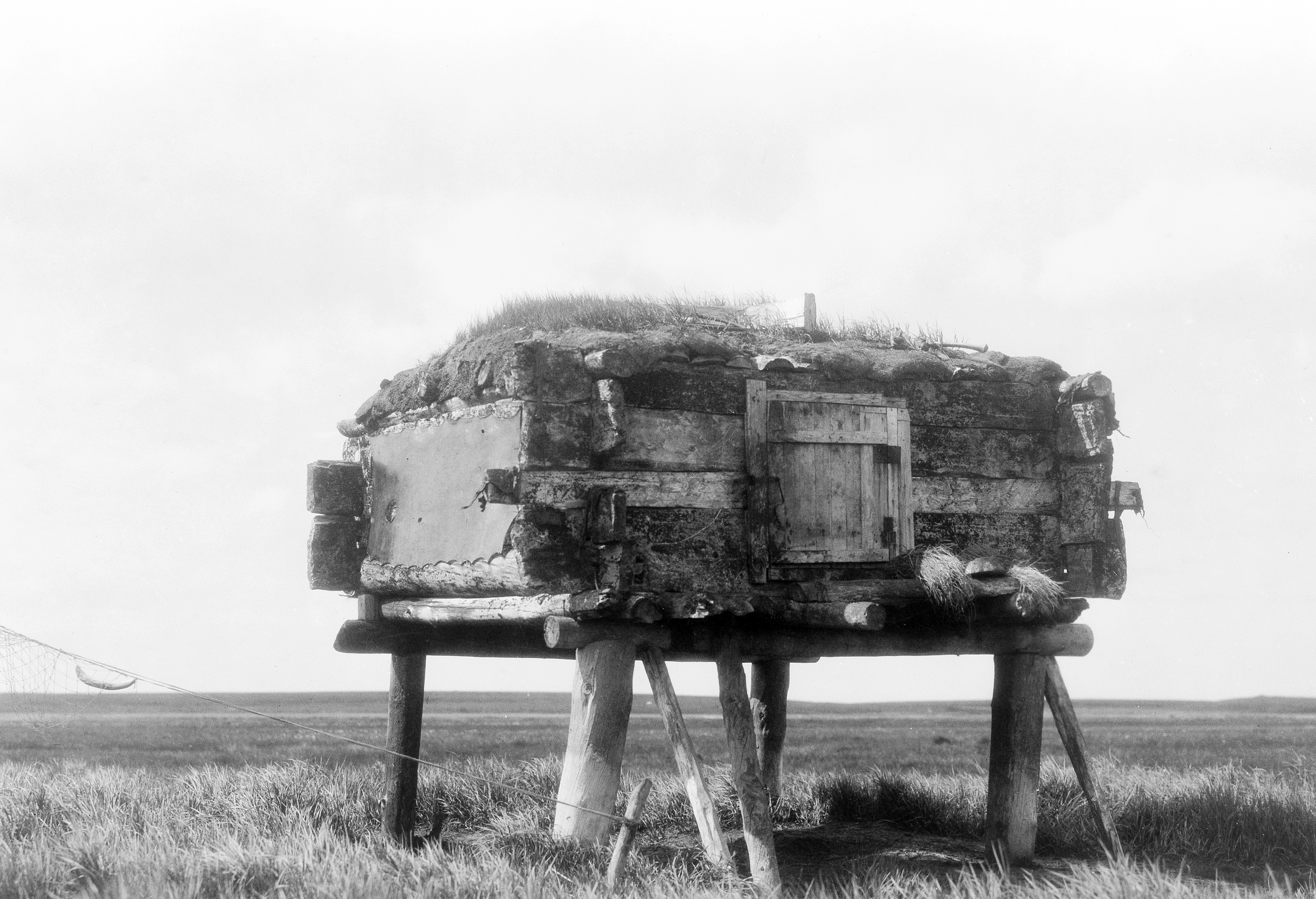
Elevated cache (qulvarvik, qulrarvik, neqivik, enekvak, mayurpik, mayurrvik, ellivik, elliwig) was used to store food where it would be safe from animals. Hooper Bay, Alaska, 1929.

Elevated cache or raised log cache, also raised cache or log storehouse (qulvarvik sg qulvarviit pl [Yukon, Kuskokwim, Bristol Bay, NR, Lake Iliamna], qulrarvik [Egegik], neqivik [Hooper Bay-Chevak, Yukon, Nelson Island], enekvak [Hooper Bay-Chevak], mayurpik [Hooper Bay-Chevak], mayurrvik [Nelson Island], ellivik [Kuskokwim], elliwig [Nunivak]) is a bear cache-like safe food storage place designed to store food outdoors and prevent animals from accessing it. Elevated cache types include log or plank caches, open racks, platform caches, and tree caches. The high cabin-on-post cache was probably not an indigenous form among either Eskimos or Alaskan Athabaskans. Cabin-on-post caches are thought to have appeared in the 1870s. The cabin on-post form may thus have been introduced by early traders, miners, or missionaries, who would have brought with them memories of the domestic and storage structures constructed in their homelands.

==== Fish ====
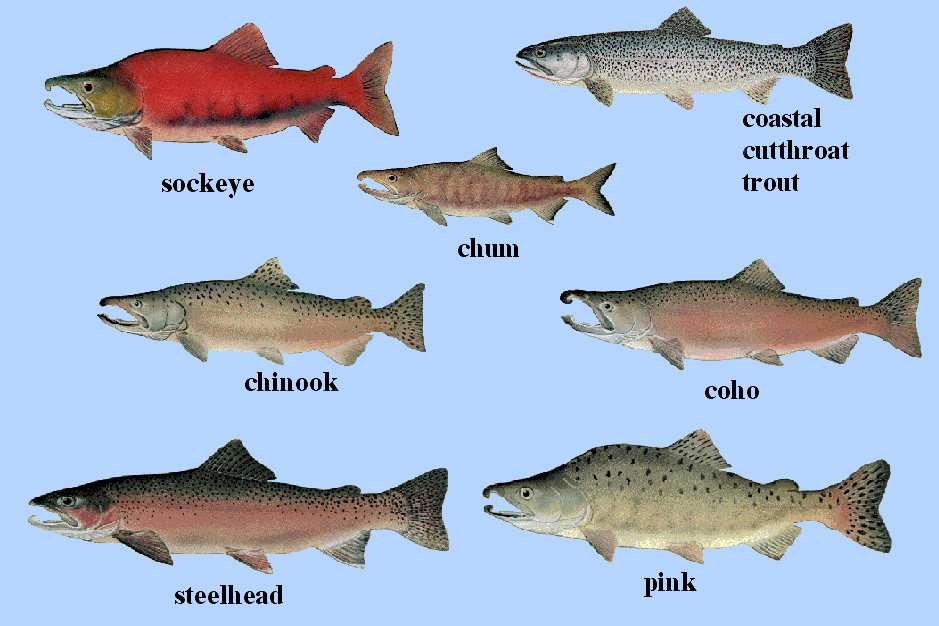
Alaskan economical salmonoid fish species (Oncorhynchus) are main food for the Yupʼik: Sockeye or Red salmon (sayak), Chum or Dog salmon (kangitneq), Chinook or King salmon (taryaqvak), Coho or Silver salmon (qakiiyaq), Pink or Humpback salmon (amaqaayak).

Fish as food, especially Pacific salmon (or in some places, non-salmon) species are the primary main subsistence food for the Yupʼik. Both food and fish (and salmon) called neqa (sg) neqet (pl) in Yupʼik. Also for salmon called neqpik ~ neqpiaq (sg) neqpiit ~ neqpiat (pl) in Yupʼik, means literally "real food". But, the main food for the Iñupiaq is meat of whale and caribou (both food and meat called niqi in Iñupiaq, also for meat called niqipiaq "real food").

Alaska subsistence communities are noted to obtain up to 97% of the omega-3 fatty acids through a subsistence diet.

Tepas, also called stink-heads, stink heads, stinky heads, are fermented fish head such as king and silver salmon heads, are a traditional food of the Yupʼik. A customary way of preparing them is to place fish heads and guts in a wooden barrel, cover it with burlap, and bury it in the ground for about a week. For a short while in modern times, plastic bags and buckets replaced the barrel. However this increased the risk of botulism, and the Yupʼik have reverted to fermenting fishheads directly in the ground.

==== Mammals ====
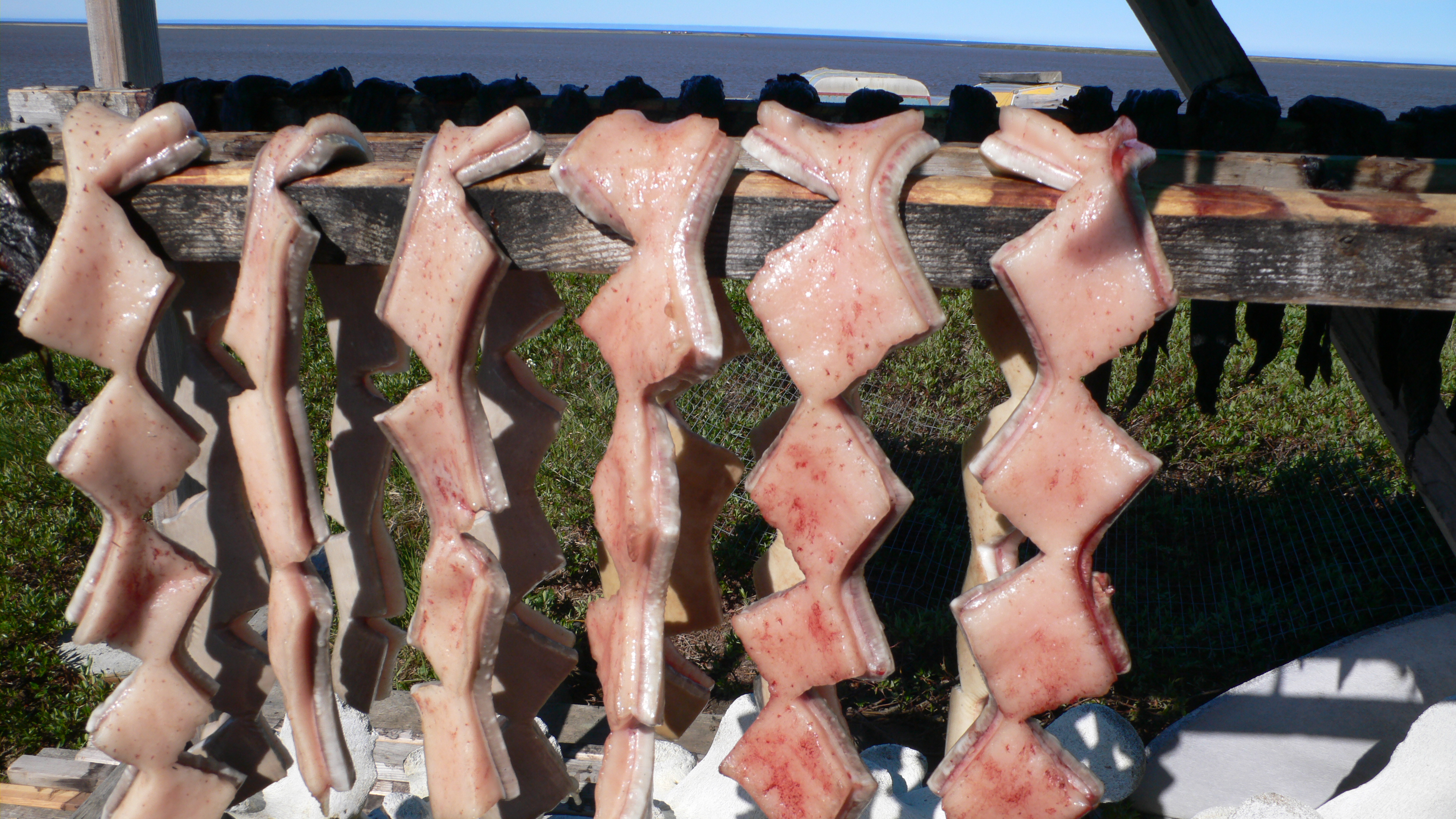
Muktuk drying at Point Lay, Alaska. June 24, 2007.

Muktuk (mangtak in Yukon, Unaliq-Pastuliq, Chevak, mangengtak in Bristol Bay) is the traditional meal of frozen raw beluga whale skin (dark epidermis) with attached subcutaneous fat (blubber).

==== Plants ====
The tundra provides berries for making jams, jellies, and a Yupʼik delicacy commonly called akutaq or "Eskimo ice cream".

The mousefood (ugnarat neqait) consists of the roots of various tundra plants which are cached by voles in burrows

=== Ceremonies ===
The dominant ceremonies are: Nakaciuq (Bladder Festival), Elriq (Festival of the Dead), Kevgiq (Messenger Feast), Petugtaq (request certain items), and Keleq (invitation).

=== Religion ===
==== Shamanism ====
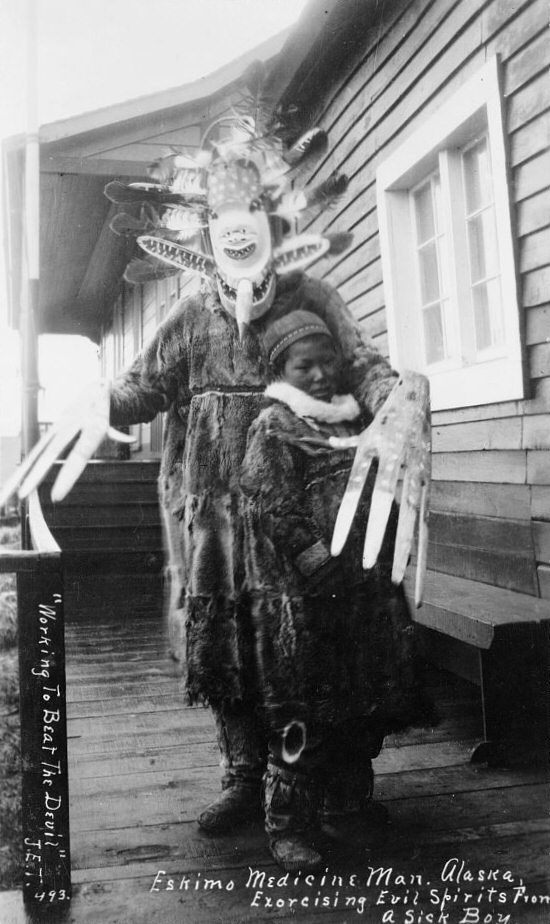
Yupʼik shaman (angalkuq) exorcising evil spirits (caarrluk) from a sick boy. The enormous wooden hands with shortened thumbs (inglukellriik unatnquak ayautaunatek) worn by the shaman. Nushagak Bay, ca. 1890s.

Historically and traditionally, Yupʼik and other all Eskimos traditional religious practices could be very briefly summarised as a form of shamanism based on animism. Aboriginally and in early historic times the shaman, called as medicine man or medicine woman (angalkuq sg angalkuk dual angalkut pl or angalkuk sg angalkuuk dual angalkuut pl in Yupʼik and Cupʼik, angalku in Cupʼig) was the central figure of Yupʼik religious life and was the middle man between spirits and the humans. The role of the shaman is the primary leader, petitioner, and a trans-mediator between the human and non-human spiritual worlds in association with music, dance, and masks. The shaman's professional responsibility was to enact ancient forms of prayers to request the survival needs of the people. The powerful shaman is called a big shaman (angarvak).

Yupʼik shamans directed the making of masks and composed the dances and music for winter ceremonies. The specified masks depicted survival essentials requested in ceremonies. Shamans often carved the symbolic masks that were vital to many Yupʼik ceremonial dances and these masks represented spirits that the shaman saw during visions. Shaman masks or plaque masks (nepcetaq sg nepcetak dual nepcetat pl) were empowered by shamans and are powerful ceremonial masks represented a shaman's helping spirit (tuunraq). Shamans wearing masks of bearded seal, moose, wolf, eagle, beaver, fish, and the north wind were accompanied by drums and music.

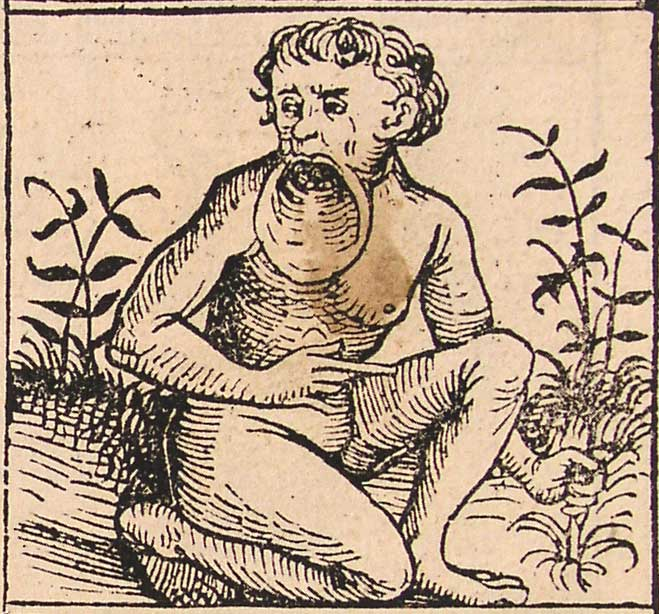
Big mouth, 1493 by Hartmann Schedel (1440–1514), Nuremberg Chronicle (Schedel'sche Weltchronik). The Big mouth similar to Yupʼik Miluquyulit

Legendary animals, monsters, and half-humans: amikuk (sea monster said to resemble an octopus); amlliq (monster fish); arularaq (monster identified as "Bigfoot"); cirunelvialuk (sea creature); cissirpak (great worm; ingluilnguq creature that is only half a person); inglupgayuk (being with half a woman's face); irci, irciq (creature, half animal and half man); itqiirpak (big hand from the ocean); kun'uniq (sea creature with human features seen on pack ice); meriiq (creature that will suck the blood from one's big toe); miluquyuli (rock-throwing creature); muruayuli (creature that sinks into the ground as it walks); paalraayak (creature that moves underground); qamurralek (being with a dragging appendage); qununiq (person who lives in the sea); qupurruyuli (being with human female face who helps people at sea); quq'uyaq (polar bear); quugaarpak (mammoth-like creature that lives underground); tengempak (giant bird); tengmiarpak ("thunderbird"); tiissiq (caterpillar-like creature that leaves a scorched trail); tumarayuli (magical kayak); tunturyuaryuk (caribou-like creature); u͡gayaran (giant in Kuskokwim-area folklore); ulurrugnaq (sea monster said to devour whales); uligiayuli (ghost said to have a big blanket, which it wraps around children who are out too late at night playing hide-and-seek, it then takes them away); yuilriq (witch or ghost that walks in the air above the ground and has no liver; a large monster that lives in the mountains and eats people).

Legendary humanoids: alirpak little person; cingssiik (little people having conical hats); ciuliaqatuk (ancestor identified with the raven); egacuayak (elf, dwarf); kelessiniayaaq (little people, said to be spirits of the dead); ircenrraq ("little person" or extraordinary person); tukriayuli (underground dweller that knocks on the earth's surface).

==== Christianity ====
Yupi'k in western and southwestern Alaska have had a long Christian history, in part from Russian Orthodox, Catholic, and Moravian influence. The arrival of missionaries dramatically altered life along the Bering Sea coast. Yupʼik beliefs and lifestyles have changed considerably since the arrival of Westerners during the 19th century.

The first Native Americans to become Russian Orthodox were the Aleuts (Unangan) living in contact with Russian fur traders (promyshlennikis) in the mid 18th century. Saint Jacob (or Iakov) Netsvetov, a Russian-Alaskan creole (his father was Russian from Tobolsk, and his mother was an Aleut from Atka Island) who became a priest of the Orthodox Church, being the first Alaska Native Orthodox priest in Alaska, and continued the missionary work of St. Innocent among his and other Alaskan Native people. He moved to the Russian Mission (Iqugmiut) on the Yukon River in 1844 and served there until 1863. Netsvetov invented an alphabet and translated church materials and several Bible texts into Yupʼik and kept daily journals.

The Russian Orthodox presence in Yupʼik territory was challenged in the late 1880s by Moravian and Catholic missions. Eventually, the Russian Orthodox missions in Alaska consolidated into a whole Diocese of Alaska, a part of the larger Orthodox Church in America which was formed from the original Russian Orthodox dioceses in North America.

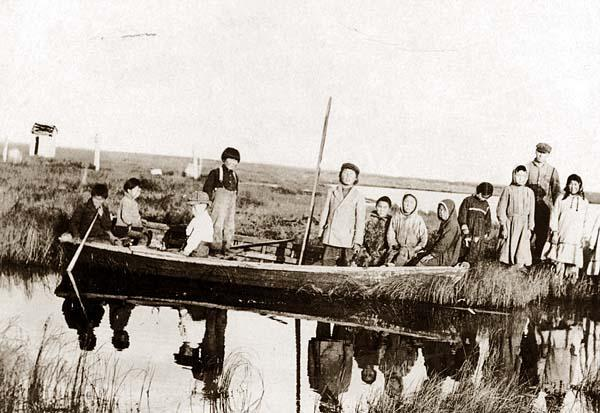
The Yupʼik at Moravian Mission Station, Bethel on the Kuskokwim River in the year 1900

The Moravian Church is the oldest Protestant denomination in Alaska, and is organized into four provinces in North America: Northern, Southern, Alaska, and Labrador. The Moravian mission was first founded at Bethel, along the Kuskokwim River in 1885. The mission and reindeer station Bethel (Mamterilleq literally "site of many caches") was first established by Moravian missionaries near or at the small Yupʼik village called Mumtrelega (Mamterilleq literally "site of many caches") or Mumtreklogamute or Mumtrekhlagamute (Mamterillermiut literally "people of Mamterilleq"). In 1885, the Moravian Church established a mission in Bethel, under the leadership of the Kilbucks and John's friend and classmate William H. Weinland (1861–1930) and his wife with carpenter Hans Torgersen. John Henry Kilbuck (1861–1922) and his wife, Edith Margaret Romig (1865–1933), were Moravian missionaries in southwestern Alaska in the late 19th and early 20th centuries. John H. Kilbuck was the first Lenape to be ordained as a Moravian minister. They served the Yupʼik, used their language in the Moravian Church in their area, and supported the development of a writing system for Yupʼik. Joseph H. Romig (1872–1951) was a frontier physician and Moravian Church missionary and Edith Margaret's brother, who served as Mayor of Anchorage, Alaska, from 1937 to 1938. Although the resemblances between Yupʼik and Moravian ideology and action may have aided the initial presentation of Christianity, they also masked profound differences in expectation.

The Society of Jesus is a Christian male religious congregation of the Catholic Church. The members are called Jesuits. In 1888, a Jesuit mission was established on Nelson Island and a year later moved to Akulurak (Akuluraq, the former site of St. Mary's Mission) at the mouth of the Yukon River. Segundo Llorente (1906–1989) was a Spanish Jesuit, philosopher, and author who spent 40 years as a missionary among the Yupʼik people in the most remote parts of Alaska. His first mission was at Akulurak.

During Christmas Yupʼiks give gifts commemorating the departed.

== Health ==
=== Food, clean water, and sanitation ===
Traditional subsistence foods, such as fish and marine mammals, and to a lesser extent shellfish, are the only significant direct dietary sources of two important types of the omega-3 fatty acids called eicosapentaenoic acid (EPA) and docosahexaenoic acid (DHA). EPA and DHA protect against heart disease and possibly diabetes. The replacement of a subsistence diet that is low in fat and high in omega-3s with a market-based Western diet has increased the risk of cardiovascular disease and diabetes in Alaska Natives. Many markets (store-bought) foods are high in fats, carbohydrates, and sodium; and these may lead to increased weight gain, high cholesterol (hypercholesterolemia), high blood pressure (hypertension), and chronic diseases.

Presently, two major problems for the growing population are water and sewage. Water from rivers and lakes is no longer potable as a result of pollution. Wells must be drilled and sewage lagoons built, but there are inherent problems as well. Chamber pots (qurrun in Yupʼik and Cupʼik, qerrun in Cupʼig) or honey buckets with waterless toilets are common in many rural villages in the state of Alaska, such as those in the Bethel area of the Yukon–Kuskokwim Delta. About one-fourth of Alaska's 86,000 Native residents live without running water and use plastic buckets, euphemistically called honey buckets, for toilets.

=== Alcohol epidemic ===
When Alaska became a state in 1959, state laws took control of alcohol regulation from the federal government and Native communities. In 1981, however, the state legislature changed the alcohol laws to give residents broad powers, via a local option referendum, to regulate how alcohol comes into their communities. The 1986 statutes have remained in effect since that time, with only relatively minor amendments to formalize the prohibition on home brew in a dry community (teetotal) and clarify the ballot wording and scheduling of local option referendums. Alaska specifically allows local jurisdictions to elect to go dry by public referendum. State law allows each village to decide on restrictions, and some boroughs may prohibit it altogether.

Since the 1960s there has been a dramatic rise in alcohol abuse, alcoholism, and associated violent behaviors, which have upset family and village life and resulted in physical and psychological injury, death, and imprisonment. Alcohol abuse and suicide are more common among Alaska Natives than among most American racial/ethnic groups, especially among rural young Yupʼik men. Unintentional injury (accidents) and intentional self-harm (suicide) have been among the leading causes of death in Native Alaska for many years. Alaska Natives have higher rates of suicide than other Native Americans of the continental United States. Alcohol abuse and dependence are associated with high rates of violence and a variety of health problems.

As of 2009, about 12% of the deaths among American Indians and Alaska Natives were alcohol-related in the United States overall. Deaths due to alcohol among American Indians are more common in men and among Northern Plains Indians, but Alaska Natives showed the lowest incidence of death. Existing data do indicate, however, that Alaska Native alcohol-related death rates are almost nine times the national average, and approximately 7% of all Alaska Native deaths are alcohol-related.

A 1995-97 study by the Centers for Disease Control found that in some continental Amerindian tribes the rate of fetal alcohol spectrum disorder was 1.5 to 2.5 per 1000 live births, more than seven times the national average, while among Alaska natives, the rate of fetal alcohol spectrum disorder was as high as 5.6 per 1000 live births.

=== Great Death ===
The Great Death or the Big Sickness (quserpak, literally "big cough") referred to the flu (influenza) pandemic (worldwide epidemic) of 1918. The 1918 flu pandemic (January 1918 – December 1920) was an unusually deadly influenza pandemic, the first of the two pandemics involving H1N1 influenza virus. It infected 500 million people across the world, including remote Pacific islands and the Arctic, and killed 50 to 100 million of them—three to five percent of the world's population—making it one of the deadliest natural disasters in human history.

In the U.S., about 28% of the population suffered, and 500,000 to 675,000 died. Native American tribes were particularly hard hit. In the Four Corners area alone, 3,293 deaths were registered among Native Americans. Entire villages perished in Alaska. The influenza epidemic across the Seward Peninsula in 1918 and 1919 wiped out about 50 percent of the native population of Nome (later an epidemic diphtheria during 1925 serum run to Nome), and 8 percent of the native population of Alaska. More than 1,000 people died in northwest Alaska, and double that across the state, and the majority were Alaska Natives. The Alaska Natives had no resistance to either of these diseases. Native tribes had no immunity. As a result of epidemics, the Yupʼik world would go upside down; it would end. From there it spread like a wildfire to all corners of Alaska, killing up to 60 percent of the Northern Indigenous and Alaskan Athabaskan people. This epidemic killed whole families and wiped out entire villages. Many Kuskuqvamiut also migrated to the Bristol Bay region from the Kuskokwim River region to the north of Bristol Bay, especially after the influenza epidemic of 1918–19.

== Contemporary Yup'ik tribes ==
Alaska Native tribal entities for the Yupʼik are recognized by the United States Bureau of Indian Affairs:

The Alaska Native Regional Corporations of the Yupʼik were established in 1971 when the United States Congress passed the Alaska Native Claims Settlement Act (ANCSA).

Community	Native tribal entities	Native Village Corporation	Native Regional Corporation
Akiachak (Akiacuaq)	Akiachak Native Community	Akiachak Limited	Calista Corporation
Akiak (Akiaq)	Akiak Native Community	Kokarmiut Corporation	Calista Corporation
Alakanuk (Alarneq)	Village of Alakanuk	Alakanuk Corporation	Calista Corporation
Aleknagik (Alaqnaqiq)	Native Village of Aleknagik	Aleknagik Natives Limited	Bristol Bay Native Corporation
Andreafsky (today: St. Mary's)	Yupiit of Andreafski	Nerklikmute Native Corporation	Calista Corporation
Aniak (Anyaraq)	Village of Aniak	Kuskokwim Corporation	Calista Corporation
Atmautluak (Atmaulluaq)	Village of Atmautluak	Atmauthluak Limited	Calista Corporation
Bethel (Mamterilleq)	Orutsararmuit Native Village (aka Bethel)	Bethel Native Corporation	Calista Corporation
Bill Moores Slough (Konogkelyokamiut)	Village of Bill Moore's Slough	Kongnigkilnomuit Yuita Corporation	Calista Corporation
Chefornak (Cevv'arneq)	Village of Chefornak	Chefarnrmute Inc.	Calista Corporation
Chevak (Cev'aq)	Chevak Native Village	Chevak Corporation	Calista Corporation
Chuathbaluk (Curarpalek)	Native Village of Chuathbaluk (Russian Mission, Kuskokwim)	Kuskokwim Corporation	Calista Corporation
Chuloonawick (? culunivik)	Chuloonawick Native Village	Chuloonawick Corporation	Calista Corporation
Clarks Point (Saguyaq)	Village of Clarks Point	Saguyak Inc.	Bristol Bay Native Corporation
Crooked Creek (Qipcarpak)	Village of Crooked Creek	Kuskokwim Corporation	Calista Corporation
Dillingham (Curyung)	Curyung Tribal Council (formerly the Native Village of Dillingham)	Choggiung Limited	Bristol Bay Native Corporation
Eek (Ekvicuaq)	Native Village of Eek	Iqfijouq Co	Calista Corporation
Egegik (Igyagiiq)	Egegik Village	Becharof Corporation	Bristol Bay Native Corporation
Ekuk	Native Village of Ekuk	Ekuk Native Limited	Bristol Bay Native Corporation
Ekwok (Iquaq)	Ekwok Village	Ekwok Natives Limited	Bristol Bay Native Corporation
Elim (Neviarcaurluq)	Native Village of Elim	Elim Native Corporation	Bering Straits Native Corp.
Emmonak (Imangaq)	Emmonak Village	Emmonak Corporation	Calista Corporation
Golovin (Cingik)	Chinik Eskimo Community (Golovin)	Golovin Native Corporation	Cook Inlet Region, Incorporated
Goodnews Bay (Mamterat)	Native Village of Goodnews Bay	Kiutsarak Inc.	Calista Corporation
Hamilton (Nunapigglugaq)	Native Village of Hamilton	Nunapiglluraq Corporation	Calista Corporation
Holy Cross (Ingirraller)	Holy Cross Village	Deloycheet Inc.	Doyon, Limited
Hooper Bay (Naparyaarmiut)	Native Village of Hooper Bay	Sea Lion Corporation	Calista Corporation
Igiugig (Igyaraq)	Igiugig Village	Igiugig Native Corporation	Bristol Bay Native Corporation
Iliamna (Illiamna)	Village of Iliamna	Iliamna Native Corporation	Bristol Bay Native Corporation
Kasigluk (Kassigluq)	Kasigluk Traditional Elders Council (formerly the Native Village of Kasigluk)	Kasigluk Inc.	Calista Corporation
Kipnuk (Qipnek)	Native Village of Kipnuk	Kugkaktilk Limited	Calista Corporation
Kokhanok (Qarr'unaq)	Kokhanok Village	Kokhanok Native Corporation	Alaska Peninsula Corporation
Koliganek (Qalirneq)	New Koliganek Village Council (formerly the Koliganek Village)	Koliganek Natives Limited	Bristol Bay Native Corporation
Kongiganak (Kangirnaq)	Native Village of Kongiganak	Qemirtalek Coast Corporation	Calista Corporation
Kotlik (Qerrulliik)	Village of Kotlik	Kotlik Yupik Corporation	Calista Corporation
Kwethluk (Kuiggluk)	Organized Village of Kwethluk	Kwethluk Inc.	Calista Corporation
Kwigillingok (Kuigilnguq)	Native Village of Kwigillingok	Kwik Inc.	Calista Corporation
Levelock (Liivlek)	Levelock Village	Levelock Natives Limited	Bristol Bay Native Corporation
Lower Kalskag (Qalqaq)	Village of Lower Kalskag	Kuskokwim Corporation	Calista Corporation
McGrath	McGrath Native Village	MTNT Limited	Doyon, Limited
Manokotak (Manuquutaq)	Manokotak Village	Manokotak Natives Limited	Bristol Bay Native Corporation
Marshall (Masserculleq)	Native Village of Marshall (aka Fortuna Ledge)	Maserculig Inc.	Calista Corporation
Mekoryuk (Mikuryar)	Native Village of Mekoryuk	Nima Corporation	Calista Corporation
Mountain Village (Asaacaryaraq)	Asa'carsarmiut Tribe (formerly the Native Village of Mountain Village)	Azachorok Inc.	Calista Corporation
Nagamut	?	Nagamut Limited	Calista Corporation
Naknek (Nakniq)	Naknek Native Village	Paug-Vik Inc. Limited	Bristol Bay Native Corporation
Napaimute (Napamiut)	Native Village of Napaimute	Kuskokwim Corporation	Calista Corporation
Napakiak (Naparyarraq)	Native Village of Napakiak	Napakiak Corporation	Calista Corporation
Napaskiak (Napaskiaq)	Native Village of Napaskiak	Napaskiak Inc.	Calista Corporation
Newhalen (Nuuriileng)	Newhalen Village	Newhalen Native Corporation	Alaska Peninsula Corporation
New Stuyahok (Cetuyaraq)	New Stuyahok Village	Stuyahok Limited	Bristol Bay Native Corporation
Newtok (Niugtaq)	Newtok Village	Newtok Inc.	Calista Corporation
Nightmute (Negtemiut)	Native Village of Nightmute	NGTA Inc.	Calista Corporation
Nunam Iqua (Nunam Iqua)	Native Village of Nunam Iqua (formerly the Native Village of Sheldon's Point)	Swan Lake Corporation	Calista Corporation
Nunapitchuk (Nunapicuar)	Native Village of Nunapitchuk	Nunapitchuk Limited	Calista Corporation
Ohagamiut (Urr'agmiut)	Village of Ohogamiut	Ohog Inc.	Calista Corporation
Oscarville (Kuiggayagaq)	Oscarville Traditional Village	Oscarville Native Corporation	Calista Corporation
Paimiut	Native Village of Paimiut	Paimiut Corporation	Calista Corporation
Pilot Station (Tuutalgaq)	Pilot Station Traditional Village	Pilot Station Native Corporation	Calista Corporation
Pitkas Point (Negeqliim Painga)	Pitka's Point Traditional Council (formerly the Native Village of Pitka's Point)	Pitkas Point Native Corporation	Calista Corporation
Platinum (Arviiq)	Platinum Traditional Village	Arvig Inc.	Calista Corporation
Portage Creek	Portage Creek Village (aka Ohgsenakale)	Ohgsenskale Corporation	Bristol Bay Native Corporation
Quinhagak (Kuinerraq)	Native Village of Kwinhagak (aka Quinhagak)	Qanirtuuq Inc.	Calista Corporation
Russian Mission (Iqugmiut)	Iqugmiut Traditional Council (formerly the Native Village of Russian Mission)	Russian Mission Native Corporation	Calista Corporation
St. Marys (Negeqliq)	Algaaciq Native Village (St. Mary's)	St. Marys Native Corporation	Calista Corporation
St. Michael (Taciq)	Native Village of Saint Michael	St. Michael Native Corporation	Bering Straits Native Corp.
Scammon Bay (Marayaarmiut)	Native Village of Scammon Bay	Askinuk Corporation	Calista Corporation
Sleetmute (Cellitemiut)	Village of Sleetmute	Kuskokwim Corporation	Calista Corporation
South Naknek (Qinuyang)	South Naknek Village	Quinuyang Limited	Alaska Peninsula Corporation
Stebbins (Tapraq)	Stebbins Community Association	Stebbins Native Corporation	Bering Straits Native Corp.
Stony River	Village of Stony River	Kuskokwim Corporation	Calista Corporation
Togiak (Tuyuryaq)	Traditional Village of Togiak	Togiak Natives Limited	Bristol Bay Native Corporation
Toksook Bay (Nunakauyaq)	Nunakauyarmiut Tribe (formerly the Native Village of Toksook Bay)	Nunakauiak Yupik Corporation	Calista Corporation
Tuluksak (Tuulkessaaq)	Tuluksak Native Community	Tulkisarmute Inc.	Calista Corporation
Tuntutuliak (Tuntutuliaq)	Native Village of Tuntutuliak	Tuntutuliak Land Limited	Calista Corporation
Tununak (Tununeq)	Native Village of Tununak	Tununrmiut Rinit Corporation	Calista Corporation
Twin Hills (Ingricuar)	Twin Hills Village	Twin Hills Native Corporation	Bristol Bay Native Corporation
Umkumiute	Umkumiut Native Village (formerly Umkumiute Native Village)	Umkumiute Limited	Calista Corporation
Upper Kalskag (Qalqaq)	Village of Kalskag	Kuskokwim Corporation	Calista Corporation

== Notable Central Alaskan Yupʼik people ==
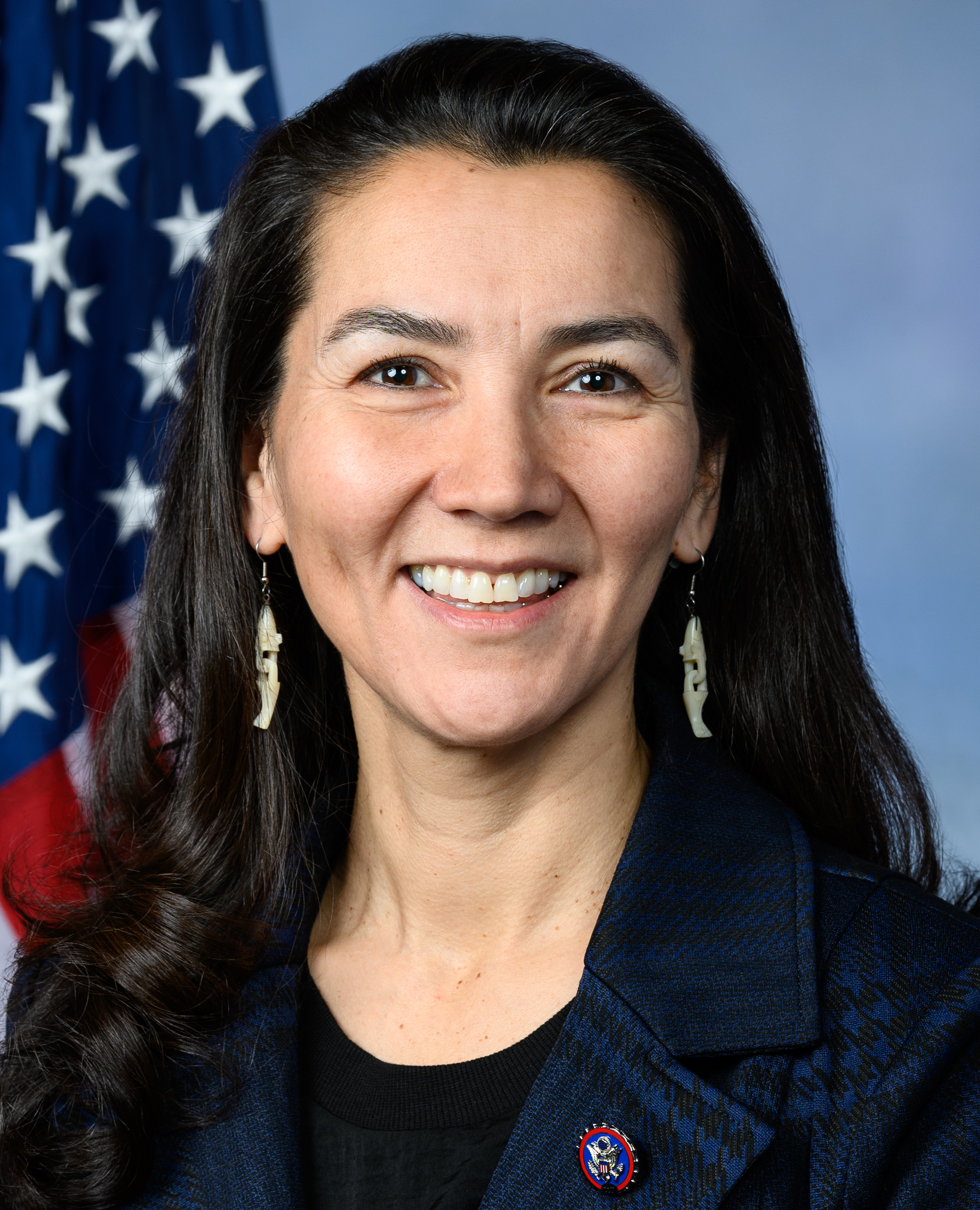
U.S. Senator-Elect Mary Peltola (Orutsararmiut Yup'ik)

- Rita Pitka Blumenstein (1936–2021), the first certified traditional doctor in Alaska
- Ramy Brooks (born 1968), a kennel owner and operator, motivational speaker, and dog musher, descended from the Yupʼik Eskimos and Athabaskan Indians
- Callan Chythlook-Sifsof (born 1989), a Yupʼik-Inupiaq snowboarder Olympian and the first Yupʼik on the U.S. National Snowboard Team and Winter Olympic Team
- Crow Village Sam (1893–1974)
- Valerie Nurr'araaluk Davidson, Lieutenant Governor of Alaska
- Lyman Hoffman, a Democratic member of the Alaska Senate
- Emily Johnson (born 1976), an American dancer, writer, and choreographer of Yupʼik descent
- Oscar Kawagley (Angayuqaq) (born 1934), a Yupʼik anthropologist, teacher, and actor
- Marie Meade, a Yugtun language expert
- Olga Michael (1916–1979), a priest's wife from Kwethluk village; Native Alaskan of Yupʼik origin.
- Peter Kaiser, first musher of Yupʼik descent to win the Iditarod
- Walt Monegan (born 1951), the former Police Chief of Anchorage
- Byron Nicholai, viral musician
- Mary Peltola (Orutsararmiut Yup'ik, born 1973), Democratic politician and U.S. Representative for Alaska's at-large congressional district; first Alaska Native and the first woman to represent Alaska in the U.S. House of Representatives
- Uyaquq (Helper Neck) (c. 1860–1924), Moravian helper, author, translator, and inventor of a Yupʼik writing system

=== Unenrolled lineal descendants ===
- Bristol Palin, public speaker and reality television personality.
- Todd Palin (born 1964), oil field production operator, commercial fisherman, and snowmobile racer (First Gentleman of Alaska, 2006–2009).

== See also ==
- Dear Lemon Lima, a family comedy feature film is about a 13-year-old half-Yupʼik girl navigating her way through her first heartbreak and the perils of prep school in Fairbanks, Alaska.

== Bibliography ==
- Barker, James H. (1993). Always Getting Ready – Upterrlainarluta: Yupʼik Eskimo Subsistence in Southwest Alaska. Seattle, WA: University of Washington Press.
- Branson, John and Tim Troll, eds. (2006). Our Story: Readings from Southwest Alaska – An Anthology. Anchorage, AK: Alaska Natural History Association.
- Federal Field Committee for Development Planning in Alaska. (1968). Alaska Natives & The Land. Washington, DC: U.S. Government Printing Office.
- Fienup-Riordan, Ann. (1983). The Nelson Island Eskimo: Social Structure and Ritual Distribution. Anchorage, AK: Alaska Pacific University Press.
- Fienup-Riordan, Ann. (1990). Eskimo Essays: Yupʼik Lives and Howe We See Them. New Brunswick, NJ: Rutgers University Press.
- Fienup-Riordan, Ann. (1991). The Real People and the Children of Thunder: The Yupʼik Eskimo Encounter With Moravian Missionaries John and Edith Kilbuck. Norman, OK: University of Oklahoma Press.
- Fienup-Riordan, Ann. (1994). Boundaries and Passages: Rule and Ritual in Yupʼik Eskimo Oral Tradition. Norman, OK: University of Oklahoma Press.
- Fienup-Riordan, Ann. (1996). The Living Tradition of Yupʼik Masks: Agayuliyararput (Our Way of Making Prayer). Seattle, WA: University of Washington Press.
- Fienup-Riordan, Ann. (2000). Hunting Tradition in a Changing World: Yupʼik Lives in Alaska Today. New Brunswick, NJ: Rutgers University Press.
- Fienup-Riordan, Ann. (2001). What's in a Name? Becoming a Real Person in a Yupʼik Community. University of Nebraska Press.
- Jacobson, Steven A., compiler. (1984). Yupʼik Eskimo Dictionary. Fairbanks, AK: Alaska Native Language Center, University of Alaska Fairbanks.
- Jacobson, Steven A. "Central Yupʼik and the Schools: A Handbook for Teachers". Juneau: Alaska Native Language Center, 1984.
- Kizzia, Tom. (1991). The Wake of the Unseen Object: Among the Native Cultures of Bush Alaska. New York: Henry Holt and Company.
- MacLean, Edna Ahgeak. "Culture and Change for Iñupiat and Yupiks of Alaska". 2004. Alaska. 12 Nov 2008 .
- Morgan, Lael, ed. (1979). Alaska's Native People. Alaska Geographic 6(3). Alaska Geographic Society.
- Naske, Claus-M. and Herman E. Slotnick. (1987). Alaska: A History of the 49th State, 2nd edition. Norman, OK: University of Oklahoma Press.
- Oswalt, Wendell H. (1967). Alaskan Eskimos. Scranton, PA: Chandler Publishing Company.
- Oswalt, Wendell H. (1990). Bashful No Longer: An Alaskan Eskimo Ethnohistory, 1778–1988. Norman, OK: University of Oklahoma Press.
- Pete, Mary. (1993). "Coming to Terms". In Barker, 1993, pp. 8–10.
- Reed, Irene, et al. Yupʼik Eskimo Grammar. Alaska: U of Alaska, 1977.
- Salisbury, Gay; Salisbury, Laney (2003). The Cruelest Miles. W.W. Norton & Company. ISBN 0-393-01962-4.
