= Marie Meade =

Native American professor and tradition bearer

Marie (Nick) Arnaq Meade (born 1947) is a Yup'ik professor in the humanities and also a Yup'ik tradition bearer. Meade's Yup'ik name is Arnaq which means "woman." She also works and travels with the International Council of Thirteen Indigenous Grandmothers. Meade is also part of the Nunamta Yup'ik Dance Group. Meade has been documenting the cultural knowledge of Yup'ik elders, including the values, language and beliefs of the Yup'ik people for over twenty years. She is currently an instructor at the University of Alaska Anchorage.

== Biography ==
Meade was born and raised in Nunapiciaq which is located between the Kuskokwim River and the Bering Sea. It was a small village of about 300 people. Her knowledge of the Yup'ik language and culture came from her father and mother, Upayuilnguq and Narullgiar, and her community. Her parents were strict, and an arranged marriage was a distinct possibility for Meade, one which she was against.

Meade attended the University of Alaska in Fairbanks. In 1970, she was chosen by the community to teach the first bilingual program in the village of Nunapiciaq in conjunction with the Bureau of Indian Affairs. She already spoke Yup'ik fluently, but had to learn to read and write in Yup'ik, which she learned at the Alaska Native Language Institute in Fairbanks. She taught for a year and then moved on to work at the Yup'ik Language Workshop, where she was involved in creating curriculum for Yup'ik language instruction.

Meade met her husband in Fairbanks where he was stationed with the United States Army. They moved to Bethel, where Meade taught Yup'ik at the Kushokwim Community College. She and her husband had two sons together, and it was while she was raising her children that she "discovered the positive energy of Yup'ik dance--much of which had been stamped out by missionaries in the 1960s." She has three grown sons and many grandchildren.

Meade was the replacement speaker at an international conference in Fairbanks taking place in 1990. The anthropologist, Ann Fienup-Riordan, was in attendance and the meeting started "two decades of partnership in the documentation of the Yup'ik culture, language and practices."

Along with Fienup-Riordan, she has worked on cultural exhibits, identified Yup'ik artifacts in Berlin which were collected from Alaska in 1883 and worked on translations together. Mead and Fienup-Riordan created the show, "Agayuliyaraput," a display of Yup'ik masks. The exhibition opened in 1997 in Toksook Bay, and was shown in Anchorage, New York, Washington, D.C., and Seattle. For the work on the Berlin artifacts in the Ethnologisches Museum, Meade translated conversations of Yup'ik elders and worked on a book, Ciuliamta Aklui, Things of Our Ancestors, which documents the art and the words of the Yup'ik elders. Her transcription was described by Arctic as "absolutely excellent, as is the translation: it is literal enough to be helpful in understanding the Yup'ik but free enough to present the substance of the elders' speech without eclipsing their eloquence."

Meade received the Governor's Award for Distinguished Humanities Educator in 2002. Meade was inducted into the Alaska Women's Hall of Fame in 2015. The Hall of Fame recognized her for "achievements in Yup'ik language and culture education."

== Publications ==
- Fienup-Riordan, Ann, ed. (2017). Qanemcit Amllertut Many Stories to Tell. Translated by Alice Rearden and Marie Meade. University of Alaska Press and Alaska Native Language Center. ISBN 9781602233362.
- Fienup-Riordan, Ann, ed. (2005). Yupiit Qanruyutait: Yup'ik Words of Wisdom. Translated by Alice Rearden and Marie Meade. University of Nebraska Press. ISBN 9780803269170.
- Fienup-Riordan, Ann, ed. (2005). Ciuliata Akluit / Things of Our Ancestors: Yup'ik Elders Explore the Jacobsen Collection at the Ethnologisches Museum Berlin. Translated by Marie Meade. University of Washington Press. ISBN 978-0295984711.
- Mather, Elsie P.; Meade, Marie; Miyaoka, Osahito (2002). "Survey of Yup'ik Grammar Revised". Endangered Languages of the Pacific Rim (23). ISSN 1346-082X.
- Fienup-Riordan, Ann, ed. (1996). Agayuliyaraput: Kegginaqut, Kangiit-llu / Our Way of Making Prayer: Yup'ik Masks and the Stories They Tell. Translated by Marie Meade. Anchorage Museum of History and Art. ISBN 0295975091.
