= Qelutviaq =

Musical instrument

The qelutviaq or kelutviaq is a one-stringed lute (or fiddle) played by the Central Alaskan Yup'ik people of Nelson Island and southwest Alaska, United States. The white or black spruce root (negavgun) is used for strings on the qelutviaq.

The instrument was attested as recently as 1971 by ethnomusicologist Ronald Walcott.
