= Rita Pitka Blumenstein =

Alaska Native healer and artist (1936–2021)

- Born: July 11, 1933; Tununak, Nelson Island, Alaska, US
- Died: August 6, 2021 (aged 88); Anchorage, Alaska, US
- Other names: Tail End Clearing of the Pathway to the Light
- Citizenship: Native Village of Tununak and US
- Occupation: Spiritual healer
- Known for: Traditional healer, teacher, traditional basketweaver, artist

Rita Pitka Blumenstein (Yup'ik, July 11, 1933 – August 6, 2021) was the first certified traditional doctor in Alaska. She worked for the Alaska Native Tribal Health Consortium. Blumenstein was a member of the International Council of 13 Indigenous Grandmothers—a group of spiritual elders, medicine women and wisdom keepers—since its founding in 2004.

== Early life ==
Blumenstein was born in a fishing boat in the village of Tununak, Nelson Island, Alaska. Her father died a month before she was born, and she felt angry not having her father around when she was a girl. Some of her earliest memories were her mother and grandmother showing her how to make baskets as a young girl.

Blumenstein was given a Yup'ik name which translates as "Tail End Clearing of the Pathway to the Light." Rita saw the poetry in the name as she regarded herself as being born during "the tail end of the old ways."

== Career ==
At the age of 15, Blumenstein spent seven months demonstrating basketry on a tour that was sponsored by the Smithsonian Institution, and the Smithsonian purchased one of the baskets she made in this period. In the 1970s Blumenstein taught basketry at Matanuska–Susitna College in Alaska, working with techniques she learned as a child, a process she described as a living interaction. In 1987 she served as a translator for an exhibit on baskets that was presented at the Anchorage Historical and Fine Arts Museum.

Blumenstein's healing abilities were recognized by the elder grandmothers of her tribe from an early age. Blumenstein began healing at the age of 4.

At the age of 9, Blumenstein's great-grandmother gave her 13 eagle feathers and 13 stones to give to the International Council of 13 Indigenous Grandmothers. Years later, when the International Council of 13 Indigenous Grandmothers convened for the first time, Blumenstein passed out these precious objects to the rest of the members with tears in her eyes.

After Blumenstein started healing people from the age of 4, she "worked at many hospitals delivering babies as a doctor's aide in Bethel and Nome". Rita carried on learning from her elders to become the first certified traditional doctor in Alaska and worked for the Alaska Native Tribal Health Consortium.

Blumenstein taught in more than 150 countries on cultural issues, basket weaving, song, and dance, "earning money for Native American Colleges." Her teachings about the "Talking circle" have been published.

In 2004, Blumenstein was approached by the Center for Sacred Studies to serve on the International Council of 13 Indigenous Grandmothers. The council has been active in protecting indigenous rights and medicines, and traditional teachings on wisdom. The council would go on to have an audience with religious leaders such as Pope Benedict XVI and the Dalai Lama later on. She was interviewed on her work with the Council by the Women Rising Radio Project in 2011.

== Personal life ==
Blumenstein was married to her husband, who was Jewish, for 43 years. Five of Blumenstein's six children have also died. Blumenstein's own health had not always been good and in 1995, she found that she had cancer. Blumenstein saw that being diagnosed with cancer made her realize that she needed to heal herself at a "deeper" level and concluded that the cancer was due to her being angry that her father had not been present in her early years. Blumenstein was training her granddaughter to also to be a healer and to know her Yup'ik traditions.

== Selected publications ==
- Blumenstein, Rita Pitka; Institute of Alaska Native Arts (Alaska) (1984). Earth dyes = nuunam qaralirkai. Fairbanks, Alaska (P.O. Box 80583, Fairbanks 99708): The Institute. OCLC 16268956.

== Awards and honors ==
In 1987 Blumenstein received an award from the governor of Alaska in recognition of her work with basketry and dance.

In 2006, both Blumenstein's Yup'ik people and her mayor declared the February 18th to be Rita Pitka Blumenstein day.

In 2009, Blumenstein was one of 50 women inducted into the inaugural class of the Alaska Women's Hall of Fame.
