= Ann Fienup-Riordan =

American cultural anthropologist (born 1948)

- Born: October 13, 1948 (age 77); Denver, Colorado, U.S.
- Education: University of Michigan, B.A. 1971; M.A. 1973; University of Chicago, Ph.D. 1980
- Known for: work with Yup'ik people of Nelson Island, Alaska
- Scientific career
- Fields: Cultural anthropology
- Workplaces: Independent

Ann Fienup-Riordan (born 1948) is an American cultural anthropologist known for her work with the Yup'ik of western Alaska, particularly on Nelson Island and the Yukon–Kuskokwim Delta. She lives in Anchorage, Alaska. She received Historian of the Year awards from the Alaska Historical Society in 1991 and 2001.

She received her Ph.D. in anthropology in 1980 from the University of Chicago, where she was influenced by David M. Schneider. Her dissertation was based on 1976-77 fieldwork on Nelson Island, Alaska.

== Awards ==
- Historian of the Year, Alaska Historical Society, 1991, 2001
- Distinguished Humanities Educator (Alaska), 2001
- Denali Award, 2000, Alaska Federation of Natives, for the greatest contribution by a non-Native

== Works ==
- Shape up with Baby: Exercise Games for the New Parent and Child (Seattle: Pennypress, 1980)
- Fienup-Riordan, Ann. (1983). The Nelson Island Eskimo: Social Structure and Ritual Distribution. Anchorage, AK: Alaska Pacific University Press. ISBN 9780935094091
- Fienup-Riordan, Ann. (1986, second printing 1994). When Our Bad Season Comes: A Cultural Account of Subsistence Harvesting & Harvest Disruption on the Yukon Delta. Alaska Anthropological Assn.
- Ann Fienup-Riordan (ed.) The Yup’ik Eskimo as Described in the Travel Journals and Ethnographic Accounts of John and Edith Kilbuck, 1885–1900. 1988. The Limestone Press, Kingston, Ontario ISBN 9780919642171
- Fienup-Riordan, Ann. (1990). Eskimo Essays: Yup'ik Lives and How We See Them. New Brunswick, NJ: Rutgers University Press. ISBN 9780813515892
- Fienup-Riordan, Ann. (1991). The Real People and the Children of Thunder: The Yup'ik Eskimo Encounter With Moravian Missionaries John and Edith Kilbuck. Norman, OK: University of Oklahoma Press. ISBN 9780806123295
- Fienup-Riordan, Ann. (1994). Boundaries and Passages: Rule and Ritual in Yup'ik Eskimo Oral Tradition. Norman, OK: University of Oklahoma Press. ISBN 9780806126463
- Fienup-Riordan, Ann. (1995). Freeze Frame: Alaska Eskimos in the Movies. Seattle, WA: University of Washington Press.
- Fienup-Riordan, Ann. (1996). The Living Tradition of Yup'ik Masks: Agayuliyararput (Our Way of Making Prayer). Seattle, WA: University of Washington Press.
- Fienup-Riordan, Ann. (2000). Hunting Tradition in a Changing World: Yup'ik Lives in Alaska Today. New Brunswick, NJ: Rutgers University Press. ISBN 9780813528052
- Fienup-Riordan, Ann. (2000). Where the Echo Began: and Other Oral Traditions from Southwestern Alaska Recorded by Hans Himmelheber Ed. Anchorage, AK: University of Alaska Press. ISBN 9781889963037
- Fienup-Riordan, Ann. (2001). What's in a Name? Becoming a Real Person in a Yup'ik Community. University of Nebraska Press.
- Fienup-Riordan, Ann; Rearden, Alice. (2005). Wise Words of the Yup'ik People: We Talk to You because We Love You. University of Nebraska Press. ISBN 9781496205162
- Yup'ik Elders at the Ethnologisches Museum Berlin: Fieldwork Turned on Its Head (University of Washington Press) ISBN 9780295985268
- Fienup-Riordan, Ann; Meade, Marie; Rearden, Alice. (2005). Yup'ik Words of Wisdom: Yupiit Qanruyutait. University of Nebraska Press. ISBN 9781496205179
- Fienup-Riordan, Ann; Jimmie, Fredda; Rearden, Alice. (2007). Yuungnaqpiallerput/The Way We Genuinely Live: Masterworks of Yup'ik Science and Survival. University of Washington Press. ISBN 9780295986692
- Fienup-Riordan, Ann; Kaplan, Lawrence. (2007). Words of the Real People: Alaska Native Literature in Translation. University of Chicago Press. ISBN 9781602230057
- Ellavut / Our Yup'ik World and Weather: Continuity and Change on the Bering Sea Coast (University of Washington Press, 2012) ISBN 9780295991610
- Anguyiim Nalliini/Time of Warring: The History of Bow-and-Arrow Warfare in Southwest Alaska (University of Alaska Press, 2016) ISBN 9781602232914
- Fienup-Riordan, Ann. (2020). "Nunakun-gguq Ciutengqertut/They Say They Have Ears Through the Ground. Animal Essays from Southwest Alaska". University of Alaska Press.
- Angalkut/Shamans in Yup'ik Oral Tradition (University of Alaska Press, 2005) ISBN 9781646427307

== Exhibitions ==
Agayuliyararput (Our Way of Making Prayer): The Living Tradition of Yup'ik Masks. The exhibit opened in 1996 in Toksook Bay and at the Yupiit Piciryarait Museum in Bethel, and then moved to the Anchorage Museum of History and Art, Anchorage. It also traveled to the University of Alaska Museum, Fairbanks, and Alaska State Museum, Juneau, the National Museum of the American Indian, New York, Smithsonian's National Museum of Natural History, Washington, D.C., and ending at the Seattle (Wash.) Art Museum in 1998.

Yuungnaqpiallerput (The Way We Genuinely Live): Masterworks of Yupik Science and Survival. The exhibition opened in 2007 at the Yupiit Piciryarait Museum, Bethel, and then at the Anchorage Museum. From 2008 to 2010 the exhibition traveled to museums in Fairbanks and Juneau, Alaska, and Washington, DC.
