= Drums of Winter =

Uksuum Cauyai: The Drums of Winter
- Directed by: Sarah Elder and Leonard Kamerling
- Produced by: Sarah Elder and Leonard Kamerling
- Cinematography: Leonard Kamerling
- Edited by: Sarah Elder
- Distributed by: Alaska Native Heritage Film Project
- Release date: 1988
- Running time: 90 minutes
- Country: United States
- Languages: Yup'ik and English with English subtitles

Uksuum Cauyai: Drums of Winter, also referred to only as Drums of Winter, is a 1988 ethnographic documentary on the culture of the Yup'ik Eskimo people in Emmonak, Alaska, a village on the shore of the Bering Sea. The film follows the Yup'ik people in an attempt to capture what remains of their traditional dances and the potlatch ceremony. There is an atmosphere of a people losing touch with its traditions after many years of religious and government intervention. The film was produced through a "community-collaborative process" in which the subjects of the documentary had significant input as to the film's content and presentation. As a result, the film features conversations with individual Yup'ik in place of "the voice-over commentary by an unseen narrator that destroys the cinematic integrity of so many so-called ethnographic films".

Drums of Winter won awards at a number of film festivals, including the American Film Festival in 1989, the International Ethnographic Film Festival in 1990, the Alaska International Film Festival in 1995, the Festival of the Native Americas in 1996, and the Margaret Mead Film Festival in 2000. In 2006, Drums of Winter was selected for preservation in the United States National Film Registry by the Library of Congress as being "culturally, historically, or aesthetically significant".
