= Byron Nicholai =

Byron Nicholai, Uqill’aq or Ukila is a Yup'ik musician from Toksook Bay, Alaska. He is best known for his viral videos singing in the Yup'ik language.

== Overview ==
Nicholai grew up in Toksook Bay. In 2014, Nicholai started uploading videos singing in his Indigenous Yup'ik language on a Facebook page called "I Sing, You Dance". One video in particular went viral and amassed over 150,000 views, deeming some media to dub him the "Justin Bieber of Alaska". In 2015, he performed for United States Secretary of State John Kerry in Washington, D.C. at the Arctic Council United States Chairmanship kickoff.

In 2015, he released his first album, "I Am Yup'ik" or Wiinga Yupiugua, in Yup'ik. The album was a best seller in world music for New Zealand and Australia on Amazon Music. He was also the subject of the ESPN 2016 documentary short of the same name. The film made the 2016 Sundance Film Festival line-up.

Since 2016, his style has ventured more into Yup'ik rap, hip hop, and R&B. He released the EPs "Still Here" in 2019 and "Assirtua (I'm Good)" in 2020. In 2022 he released his 2nd album called Ayagnera.

== Awards ==
In 2014, Nicholai won the Alaska Federation of Natives President's Award. In 2015, Nicholai was awarded an Alaskan Spirit of Youth award.
