= Paimiut, Alaska =

Unincorporated community in the state of Alaska, United States

Paimiut Paimiut
- Unincorporated community (summer fishing camp)
- Location within Alaska
- Coordinates: 61°42′03″N 165°50′19″W
- Country: United States
- State: Alaska
- Census Area: Kusilvak Census Area

Government
  - State senator: Lyman Hoffman (D)
  - State rep.: Zach Fansler (D)

Population (2010)
  - Total: 0

Paimuit is an unincorporated community in Kusilvak Census Area, Alaska, United States. It was unpopulated as of 2010, down from two residents in 2000. The nearest town is Hooper Bay, Alaska. The elevation is 30 feet. Paimiut is an Eskimo name meaning, "people of the stream's mouth". The town is on the east bank of the Lithkealik River.

== Demographics ==
Historical population
Census	Pop.	Note	%±
1980	1		—
1990	0		−100.0%
2000	2		—
2010	0		−100.0%
U.S. Decennial Census

Paimiut (of Wade Hampton, now Kusilvak Census Area) first appeared on the 1980 U.S. Census as an unincorporated village given the designation of Alaska Native Village Statistical Area (ANVSA). As of 2010, it does not have any residents.

Paimiut is not to be confused with two other similar named communities: one was located within Bethel Census Area named Paimute (on the Kuskokwim River) and the other, also named Paimiut, on the Yukon River at the Paimiut Hills within the Yukon-Koyukuk Census Area. Both appeared on the 1880 U.S. Census with the latter also returning in 1890, but neither have appeared separately since.

== Tourism ==
The area is rich in fish. Paimiut is a fishing camp in the summer. During the winter, no residents remain (though in the 2000 census, 2 residents did reside over winter).
