= Umkumiut =

Hunting and fishing camp

Umkumiute, Alaska
- Former settlement
- Interactive map of Umkumiute, Alaska
- Coordinates: 60°29′58.75″N 165°11′55.89″W
- Country: United States
- State: Alaska
- Census Area: Bethel Census Area
- Time zone: UTC−9 (Alaska (AKST))
  - Summer (DST): UTC−8 (AKDT)
- GNIS feature ID: 1411511

Umkumiut is a seasonal hunting and fishing camp on Nelson Island, near Kangirlvar Bay, 9 miles (14 km) southeast of Cape Vancouver, at the Yukon-Kuskokwim Delta.

Situated in Bethel Census Area, Alaska, United States, this community is not an independent village as it is counted as part of the community of Toksook Bay.

It was also the spring camp site for residents of Nightmute.

The word Umkumiut literally means "people of Umkuuk," which are the name of the cliffs above the village.
