= Nelson Island (Alaska) =

Island in Alaska, United States

Nelson
Native name: Qaluyaaq
- Location within Alaska

Geography
- Location: Bering Sea
- Coordinates: 60°38′21″N 164°45′01″W
- Area: 843 sq mi (2,180 km^{2})
- Length: 42 mi (68 km)
- Width: 35 mi (56 km)

Administration
- United States
- State: Alaska
- Census Area: Bethel

Demographics
- Population: 1197 (2010)
- Pop. density: 0.54/km^{2} (1.4/sq mi)

Nelson Island (Central Yupik: Qaluyaaq) is an island in the Bethel Census Area of southwestern Alaska. It is 42 miles (68 km) long and 20–35 miles (32–56 km) wide. With an area of 843 square miles (2,183 km^{2}), it is the 15th largest island in the United States. It is separated from the Alaska mainland to its north by the Ningaluk River, to its east by the Kolavinarak River and from Nunivak Island to its southwest by the Etolin Strait.

Nelson Island has four permanent communities along its coast:

- Tununak
- Toksook Bay
- Nightmute
- Mertarvik

Umkumiut, a seasonally occupied fish camp is also located on the island.

A snowmobile trail connects the Tununak and Nightmute in the winter. These three communities comprise the entire population of the island at 1,065 inhabitants as of the 2000 census. The largest community is Toksook Bay. The rest of the island, over 77 percent of its area, is unpopulated.

The village of Newtok, on the mainland across the Ningaluk River north of the island, is in the process of being moved to Nelson Island, due to erosion of the water table in the area where Newtok is currently located.

The natives are Yupiit, who maintain a predominantly traditional diet, fishing and hunting musk ox and caribou.

== Etymology ==
Nelson Island was named after Edward William Nelson, a Smithsonian Institution naturalist and ethnologist who studied the island and people there in 1878.

== Demographics ==
Historical population
Census	Pop.	Note	%±
1930	395		—
1940	254		−35.7%
U.S. Decennial Census

Nelson Island reported on the 1930 and 1940 U.S. Censuses as an unincorporated area (which included 5 villages on the 1940 census, including Nevortolemute, Nigtmuit (Nightmute), Pngortalick, Tanunak (Tununak), and Ukak. It has not reported as a separate entity since.
