= Yupʼik masks =

Shamanic ritual masks made by the Yup'ik

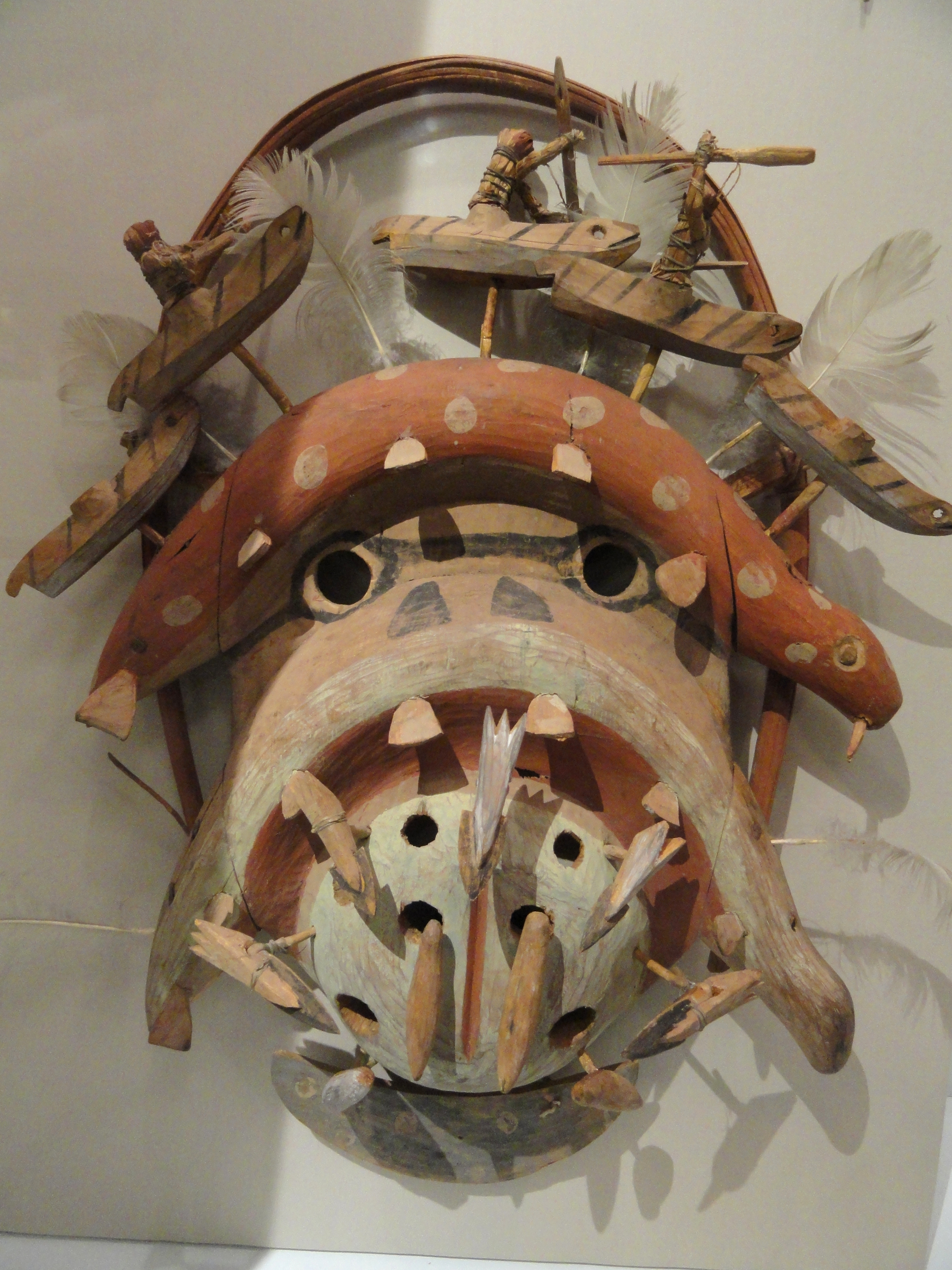
A Yup'ik/Cup'ik dance mask (kegginaquq) with the head of walrus yua. Toggle harpoon points are appended to the lower face, over which two walrus figures arch, topped by hunters in kayaks. Mask collected from old village of Qissunaq (or Kushunak, the location is near the modern village of Chevak, Alaska) in 1905 by Tununak trader I. A. Lee. Peabody Museum of Archaeology and Ethnology, Harvard University.

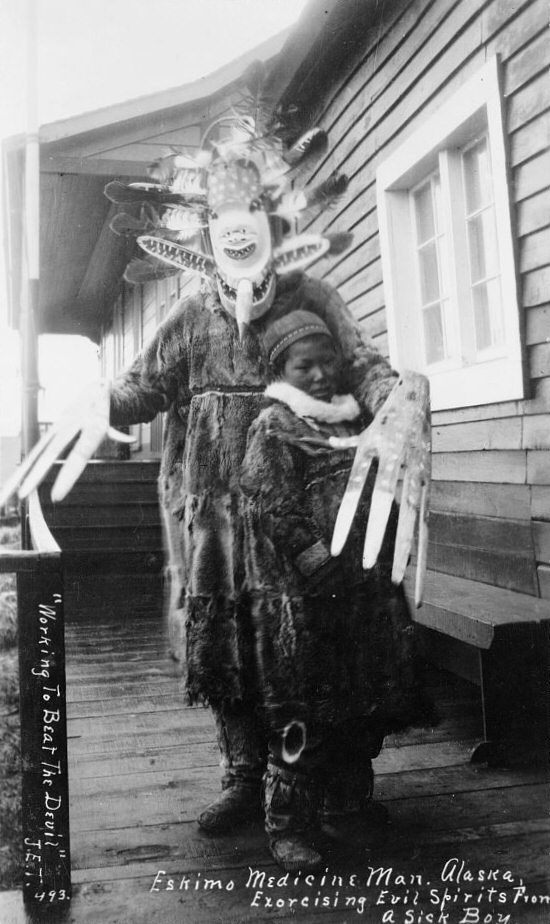
Yup'ik shaman exorcising evil spirits from a sick boy, Nushagak, Alaska, 1890s.

Yup'ik masks (Yup'ik kegginaquq sg kegginaquk dual kegginaqut pl and nepcetaq sg nepcetat pl; in the Lower Yukon dialects avangcaq sg avangcak dual avangcat pl; in Nunivak Cup'ig dialect agayu) are expressive shamanic ritual masks made by the Yup'ik people of southwestern Alaska. Also known as Cup'ik masks for the Chevak Cup'ik dialect speaking people of Chevak and Cup'ig masks for the Nunivak Cup'ig dialect speaking people of Nunivak Island. They are typically made of wood, and painted with few colors. The Yup'ik masks were carved by men or women, but mainly were carved by the men. The shamans (angalkuq) were the ones that told the carvers how to make the masks. Yup'ik masks could be small three-inch finger masks or maskettes (or dance fans, in the Lower Yukon Yup'ik dialects tegumiaq sg tegumiak dual tegumiat pl), but also ten-kilo masks hung from the ceiling or carried by several people. These masks are used to bring the person wearing it luck and good fortune in hunts. Over the long winter darkness dances and storytelling took place in the qasgiq using these masks. They most often create masks for ceremonies but the masks are traditionally destroyed after being used. After Christian contact in the late nineteenth century, masked dancing was suppressed, and today it is not practiced as it was before in the Yup'ik villages.

While the Iñupiaq and Yup'ik are culturally and ethnically related, separated only by language differences and, often, hundreds of miles of territory, they have developed distinct versions of similar traditional mask forms. In the case of the Iñupiaq, masks are typically less elaborate than those made by their Yup'ik neighbors to the south-east, and usually smaller, covering only the face.

Yup'ik masks are often compared to the European surrealist tradition. A 2018 show in New York City explored this comparison.

== See also ==
- Yupiit Piciryarait Cultural Center
- Yup'ik dancing
- Qargi
- Bladder Festival
- Messenger Feast
