= Yupʼik dance =

Traditional Inuit style dancing

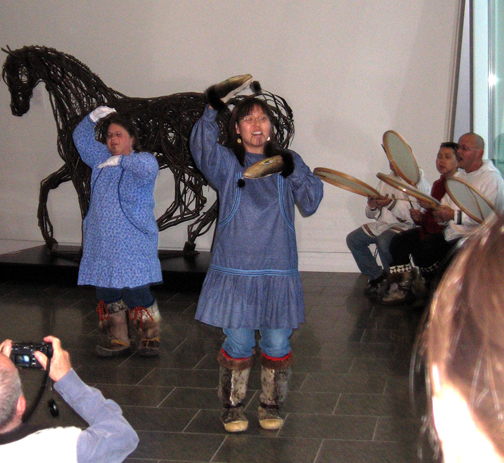
Alaska Native dance troupe with skirtled Kuskokwim style kuspuk at the University of Alaska Museum of the North.

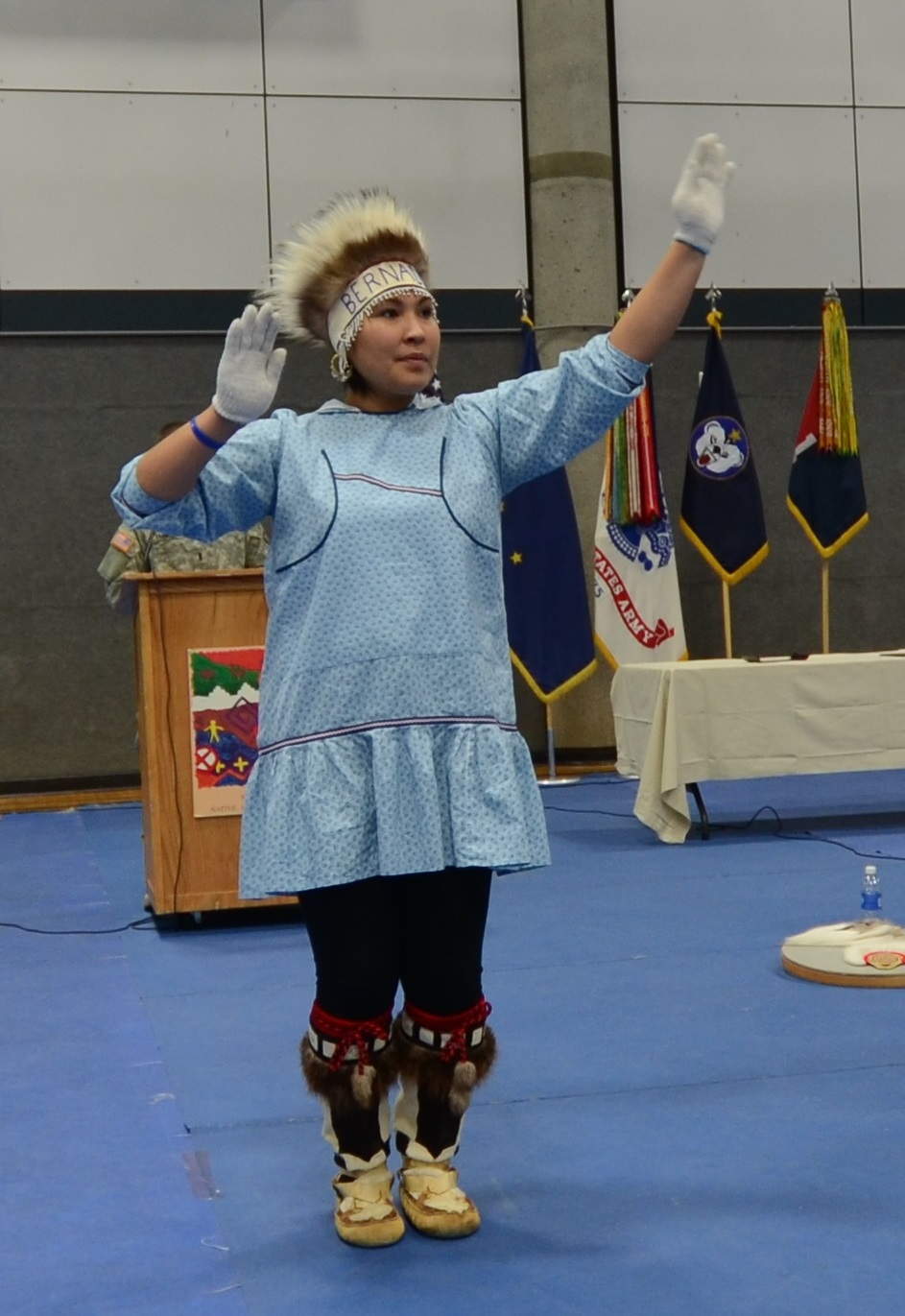
Yup'ik dancer from Inu-Yupiaq dance group performing in a kuspuk

Yup'ik dance or Yuraq, also Yuraqing (Central Yupik: yuraq [juʁaq] (sg.), yurak (dual), yurat (pl.)) is a traditional Eskimo style dancing form usually performed to songs in Yup'ik, with dances choreographed for specific songs which the Yup'ik people of southwestern Alaska. Also known as Cup'ik dance for the Chevak Cup'ik dialect speaking Yup'ik of Chevak and Cup'ig dance for the Nunivak Cup'ig dialect speaking Yup'ik of Nunivak Island. Yup'ik dancing is set up in a very specific and cultural format. Typically, the men are in the front, kneeling and the women stand in the back. The drummers are in the very back of the dance group. Dance is the heart of Yup’ik spiritual and social life. Traditional dancing in the qasgiq is a communal activity in Yup’ik tradition. The mask (kegginaquq) was a central element in Yup'ik ceremonial dancing.

Inuit dancing of their ancestors was banned by Christian missionaries in the late 19th century as primitive idolatry. After a century, Cama-i dance festival is a cultural celebration that started in the mid-1980s with a goal to gather outlying village Inuit dancers to share their music and dances. There are now many dance groups who perform Inuit dances in Alaska. Most popular activity in the Yup'ik-speaking Inuit area is rediscovered Yup'ik dancing.

== Eskimo dancing ==
Both Yup'ik and Iñupiaq dancing are also known as Eskimo dance in Alaska.

The most obvious ways in which the Eskimo dancing of northwestern Alaska (known as Iñupiaq style Eskimo dance) differs from that of southwestern Alaska (known as Yup'ik style Eskimo dance) are in the beating of the frame-drum from below, rather than from above; the standing, rather than the kneeling of the male dancers; the very small use of decorative dance fans (de rigueur in the south); and the considerable musical ceremonialism that still survives (which never developed as much in the south and southwest of Alaska, although it certainly existed there).

== Yuraryaraq ==
Yuraryaraq sg Yuraryarat pl (lit. "way[s] of dancing") or Yupiit Yuraryarait (lit. "Yup'ik ways of dancing") embrace six fundamental key entities identified as ciuliat (ancestors), angalkuut (shamans), cauyaq (drum), yuaruciyaraq (song structures), yurarcuutet (regalia) and yurarvik (dance location).

The ancestors (ciuliaq sg ciuliat pl, ciuliaput "our ancestors") are regarded with respect and believed to be part of the living in Yup'ik epistemology.

The shaman (angalkuq sg angalkuk dual angalkut pl) played a functional role in dance. The role of shaman as the primary leader, petitioner, and a trans-mediator between the human and non-human spiritual worlds in association with music, dance, and masks. The shaman's professional responsibility was to enact ancient forms of prayers to request for the survival needs of the people. The specified masks depicted survival essentials requested in ceremonies. Shamans often carved the symbolic masks that were vital to many Yup'ik ceremonial dances and this masks represented spirits that the shaman saw during visions. Nepcetat (powerful ceremonial masks) were empowered by shamans. Shamans wearing masks of bearded seal, moose, wolf, eagle, beaver, fish, and the north wind were accompanied with drums and music.

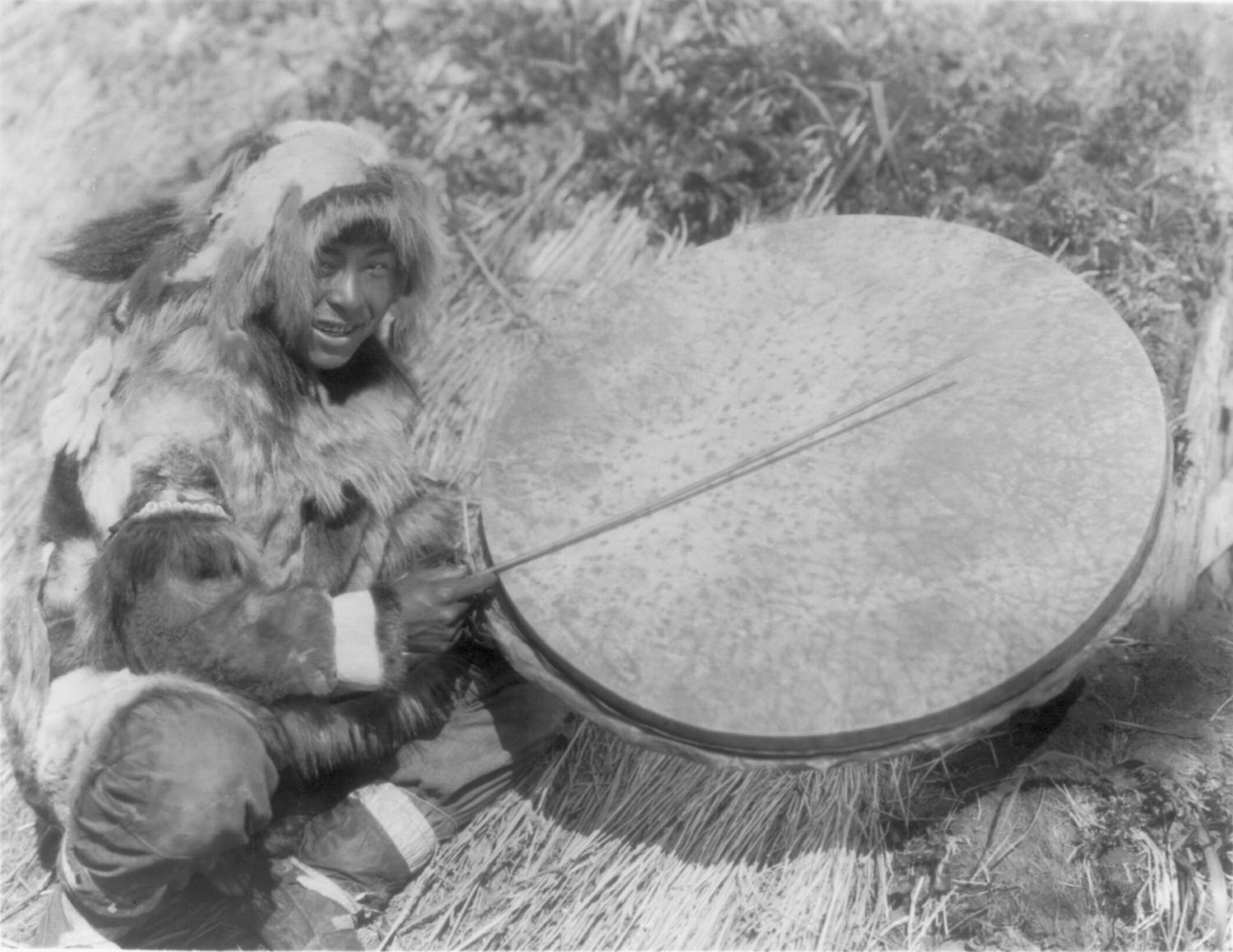
Nunivak Cup’ig playing a very large drum in 1927 by Edward S Curtis.

The drum (cauyaq sg cauyak dual cauyat pl) is the only instrument in yuraryaraq. The drum is made with a round bentwood frame crafted with a designed handle and is accompanied with a drum stick (cauyaun, mumeq, mengruq). Traditionally, the drumskin (eciq or cauyam ecia) was made out of fine mammal stomach lining. The drum was to be treated with respect and used for ceremonial purposes. The Yup'ik calendar clearly marks the seasons and seasonal rounds of activity. The November (Cauyarvik in Nelson Island dialect, Causarvik in Kotlik dialect, lit. "place for drumming”) is the time for drumming.

The song structures (yuaruciyaraq sg) in ceremonies are composed and choreographed differently. The ceremonies are accompanied with music and must adhere to specific composition formalities as practiced by Yup’ik ancestors. This musical forms of songs are warm-up chorus (ayakata’aryaraq), chorus (agnera), first verse (apalluan ciuqlia), voiceless motion (cauyarialnguq), second verse (apalluan kinguqlia), encore (pamyua).

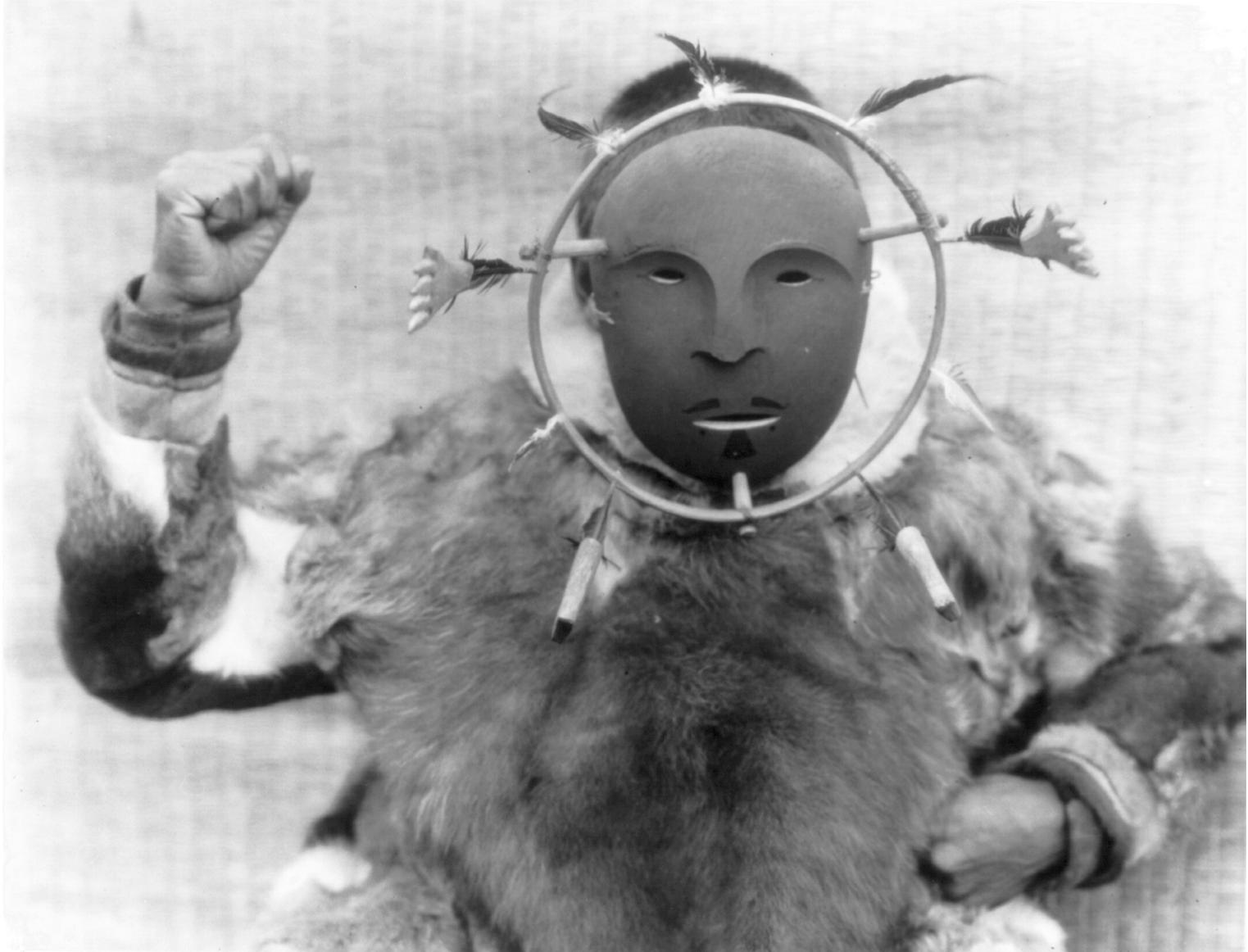
A man wearing a ceremonial mask of the Nunivak Cup’ig style in 1927 by Edward S Curtis.

The dance regalia (yurarcuun sg yurarcuutek dual yurarcuutet pl) includes qaliq (fancy fur parka), nasqurrun (wolf/wolverine/caribou beaded headdress), uyamik (beaded necklaces), tegumiak (finger mask or woven grass caribou dance fans), piluguuk (decorated boots), and ivory/beaded earrings. Men wear round wooden fans with waterfowl or owl feathers. Today, both female and male dancers wear designed qaspeq (hand-sewn calico pullover clothing).

Dance mask (kegginaquq sg kegginaquk dual kegginaqut pl) was a central element in Yup'ik ceremonial dancing.

Dance fans or finger masks or maskettes (tegumiaq sg tegumiak dual tegumiat pl): Hand-held fans accentuate the fluid movements of a dancer's arms. They were used in traditional winter ceremonies and continue as part of contemporary Yup’ik dance regalia. Men's fans, like this pair, have feathers inserted into wooden hoops.

Dance headdress (nasqurrun sg nasqurrutek dual nasqurrutet pl): Women wore similar headdresses, which remain a part of modern Yup’ik dance regalia for both sexes.

The dance location (yurarvik sg yurarviik dual yurarviit pl lit. "place for dancing”). The qasgiq is where people danced in ancient times. The qasgiq, was the community center for ceremonies and festivals which included singing, dancing, and storytelling.

== Types ==
The Yuraq (yuraq sg yurak dual yurat pl) is use generic term for Yup'ik/Cup’ik regular dance. Also, yuraq is concerned with animal behaviour and hunting of animals, or with ridicule of individuals (ranging from affectionate teasing to punishing public embarrassment). But, use for inherited dance is Yurapik or Yurapiaq (yurapiaq ~ yurapik sg yurapiit pl, lit. "real dance") and yurapik long story dance performed by women, or is a dance style that relates to dance sequences that have no associated song [and] are owned by individuals and passed down through family lines.

Types of dances are nangercelluku (first dances), yagirat (motions dances), cukaqautet (fast beat dances), ciuqitet (contemporary dances), ingulautet (slow dances). Rhythmic dances combined distinct gestures, story-telling, songs and the use of drums and masks. There were six styles of yuraq: arula dances consisting of yuraq, verse and chorus; yurapiat (storytelling dances); ingula dances, which were slow, old-style dances performed by women following berry harvests; pualla dances, primarily performed by men; yurat done to taitnauq songs; and telciqata'arcutet, or proper entrance dances.

== Banning of dancing ==
The reasons of the discrediting of traditional native dances are the effects of social changes that came about in the late 19th century as a result of fur trade, epidemics, and missionary activity. Along with the expansion of Europeans and Americans into Alaska were accompanying hardships for the indigenous people: epidemic diseases, strong Christian missionary activities, and western educational policies such as English language-only rules. Ancestral Eskimo dancing and non-Christian festivities, traditional ceremonies, and shamanistic rites were discouraged or even demonized and banned by Christian missionaries in the late 19th century as primitive idolatry. Shamanistic rituals are no longer practiced, although some elders have information about these rites. Song and dance have remained. The Moravian Church had banned dancing from the villages. Yuraq dancing feasts between villages in the King Salmon and Naknek region were forbidden by Russian Orthodox priests as of 1933. Dancing as part of Yup'ik feasts no longer existed as Jesuit missionaries forbade it at the end of the 19th century. Many of these spiritual ceremonies, such as the Agayuyaraq, an intervillage ceremony associated with the performance of masked dances usually at the end of the winter season, were abandoned. Masked dances and the Kelek (masquerade) dances were among the first to be removed from Yup'ik practice. Because of their highly spiritual content, dances were considered dangerous by missionaries who called them "heathen idol worship, devil's frolic and black art".

== Dance festivals ==
There are now many dance groups who perform Eskimo dances in Alaska. There are many performances and festivals, however, that are more traditional in their role. Masked dances especially have served as a strong reminder of the connection to the worlds of animals and spirits. Dances embody the Yup'ik conception of the world. The beliefs that stem from this conception are the models by which Yup'iks live. Today, a dance festival, both in preparation and the actual event, consumes an entire village with its significance, just as it did in pre-contact times.

The first Yup'ik dance festival is Yupiit Yuraryarait (lit. "Yup'ik ways of dancing") started in 1982 at St. Mary's (Negeqliq), fostering a revival of the traditions of the Yup’ik people. Concerned about the survival of Yup’ik cultural heritage, the Negeqliq first brought together artists where traditional dancing was still practiced to participate in a festival designed to pass on dance traditions to younger generations. Nine villages in Yukon–Kuskokwim Delta came to that intervillage festival. The success of that event stimulated the creation of dance festivals throughout the lower Yukon River region. The Yupiit Yuraryarait is a dance festival that is now held every three or four years.

The second Yup'ik dance festival is Cama-i (lit. "hello; greetings; pleased to meet you; good to see you again") started in 1984 in Bethel (Mamterilleq). Traditional dancers from all over Alaska and beyond participate every March in the Cama-i dance festival. Bethel is unique in the region in having an astounding diversity of cultures, including a large contingent of Koreans. The Cama-i dance festival, an annual event in Bethel in the spring, hosts Alaska Native dancers from all over the state as well as Korean and Japanese dancers, and dancers from other regions of the world and the nation.

== See also ==
- Drums of Winter (Uksuum Cauyai)
- Inu-Yupiaq
- Pamyua
- Messenger Feast (kevgiq)
- Bladder Festival (nakaciuq)
- Yupiit Piciryarait Cultural Center
- Inuit music
