= Cugtun =

Cugtun is an endonym that may refer to either of two Yup'ik dialects:

- Chevak Cup’ik language, spoken in the Chevak
- Nunivak Cup'ig language, spoken in the Nunivak Island
