= Cup'ik (disambiguation) =

Cup'ik, also spelled Cupik, typically refers to the Central Alaskan Yup'ik people. The plural form is Cup'it.

Other uses include:

== People ==
- Calista Corporation, an Alaskan regional corporation with largely Central Alaskan Yup'ik people as members

== Languages ==
- Central Alaskan Yup'ik language
  - Chevak Cup’ik language or Hooper Bay-Chevak Cup'ik
  - Nunivak Cup'ig language

== See also ==
- Alaska Natives
- List of Alaska Native tribal entities
- Siberian Yupik
