= KCUK =

Coordinates: 61.529°N 165.591°W

Chevak, Alaska; United States
- Broadcast area: Alaska Bush
- Frequencies: 88.1 (MHz) (HD Radio)
- Branding: 88.1 KCUK

Programming
- Format: Public radio

Ownership
- Owner: Kashunamiut School District

Technical information
- Facility ID: 33453
- Class: A
- ERP: 6,000 watts
- HAAT: 24 meters (79 ft)

Links
- Webcast: Listen Live
- Website: KCUK Radio

KCUK is a non-commercial radio station in Chevak, Alaska, broadcasting on 88.1 FM. It includes local programming, plus programming from National Public Radio and Native Voice One.
