= YPCC =

YPCC may refer to:

- Yupiit Piciryarait Cultural Center, Bethel, Alaska, United States
- Cocos (Keeling) Islands Airport, Australia
