= Yupiit Piciryarait Cultural Center =

Non-profit cultural center in the United States

Coordinates: 60.79073°N 161.7715°W

General information
- Type: Cultural center
- Location: Bethel, Alaska, United States
- Construction started: 1994
- Completed: 1995; 31 years ago
- Client: University of Alaska Fairbanks and Association of Village Council Presidents
- Owner: UAF's Kuskokwim Campus, AVCP, City of Bethel

Design and construction
- Architecture firm: Livingston Slone Architects

Website
- www.uaf.edu/bethel/cultural-center/

The Yupiit Piciryarait Cultural Center (YPCC), also known as Yupiit Piciryarait Cultural Center and Museum, formerly known as the Yup'ik Museum, Library, and Multipurpose Cultural Center (or Facility), is a non-profit cultural center of the Yup'ik (and sometimes Alaskan Athabaskan of the region) culture centrally located in Bethel, Alaska near the University of Alaska Fairbanks' Kuskokwim Campus and city offices. The center is a unique facility that combines a museum, a library, and multi-purpose cultural activity center including performing arts space, for cultural gatherings, feasts, celebrations, meetings and classes, and that celebrates the Yup'ik culture and serves as a regional cultural center for Southwest Alaska. The name of Yupiit Piciryarait means "Yup'iks' customs" in Yup'ik language and derived from piciryaraq meaning "manner; custom; habit; tradition; way of life". Construction of this cultural facility was completed in 1995, funded through a State appropriation of federal funds. Total cost for construction was $6.15 million. The center was jointly sponsored by the Association of Village Council Presidents (AVCP) and the University of Alaska Fairbanks (UAF) and at the present the center operated by the UAF's Kuskokwim Campus, AVCP and City of Bethel. The building houses three community resources: the Consortium Library, the Yup'ik Museum, and the Multi-purpose room or auditorium. The mission of the center is promote, preserve and develop the traditions of the Yup'ik through traditional and non-traditional art forms of the Alaska Native art, including arts and crafts, performance arts, education, and Yup'ik language. The center also supports local artists and entrepreneurs.

== Architecture ==
The Yupiit Piciryarait Cultural Center was built in 1994‐95 to be a community and regional asset. The architectural design of the facility celebrates the Yup'ik culture and designed by Livingston Slone Architects of Anchorage. In keeping with the preservation and conservation of the Yup'ik culture, Yup'ik themes such as the double circle motif or circle-and-dot design (ellanguaq sg ellanguat pl in Yup'ik) like Yup'ik masks that represent the cosmos and earth, are incorporated into architectural elements throughout the building, such as the ceiling patterns and light fixtures. The performing arts space includes a platform for dancing that is located under a raised ceiling designed to refer to the Yup'ik qasgiq (traditional large semisubterranean men's community house), the museum provides exhibit space for Alaska Native arts and crafts and support spaces and storage areas are environmentally controlled to assure proper storage of artifacts and artwork.

== Management ==
The entire facility is owned and managed by the UAF's Kuskokwim Campus, which oversees facility operations and maintenance and provides building security. The university is also in charge of renting out the facility's conference space. The multi-purpose room managed by UAF's Kuskokwim Campus. The Yup'ik Museum and gift shop operated by the Association of Village Council Presidents, Inc. (AVCP). The Consortium Library operated by the City of Bethel and the UAF.

The UAF presently has a three-year grant from the United States Department of Housing and Urban Development to increase the sustainability of this facility. The university is applying for a three-year continuation of this grant. The City of Bethel contributes to library operations. Association of Village Council Presidents controls museum space and gift shop and pays a lease of $20,000 per year.

== Multi-purpose auditorium ==
The multipurpose room or auditorium managed by UAF's Kuskokwim Campus, used for trainings, classes, conferences, concerts and meetings. It is the largest facility of its kind in the delta and much in demand. The multi-purpose rooms and classroom, designed for community and cultural events and conferences, are in high demand. The multi-purpose auditorium houses a stage for dance and community meetings.

Other events held at this facility include: weekly Saturday Markets, Cultural Nights, Summer Arts Camp (for local youth), art classes (held during the regular school year), Yup'ik dance nights (in which local dance groups perform for the public), and Athabaskan fiddle dances. A university representative reported that they try to schedule activities that are tied to arts and culture.

=== Saturday market ===
The center serves as a regional gathering center for Yup'iks to stimulate ideas, advance their traditional knowledge and traditional ecological knowledge, and enhance the quality of life. The center also hosts a bimonthly summer "Saturday Market" where artisans and crafters from the Yukon-Kuskokwim Delta come to sell their crafts. There is a variety at the market, but many of the crafts include traditional Yup'ik parka cover or kuspuk (qaspeq), story knives (yaaruin), woven baskets (mingqaaq), ulu (semilunar woman's knife) and more. The center and local partners developed a fund based competition for start-up Yukon-Kuskokwim region businesses.

== Yup'ik Museum ==
The Yup'ik Museum, also known as Yupiit Museum or Yupiit Piciryarait Museum, is a repository of cultural heritage artifacts and art from the Yukon-Kuskokwim Delta region and is the only museum of its kind in the region of Alaska. The museum is a tribally-owned and operated museum, located inside the YPCC in Bethel. The board of directors for the museum and gift shop is the Association of Village Council Presidents. The museum is located within the 18,000 square foot cultural center and houses approximately 5000 pieces of art, pictures and artifacts. The areas related to the museum total 3,800 square feet and include storage, a gift shop, and offices.

The gallery houses two permanent exhibits, and one temporary exhibit that changes every 3 months. The museum is free to the public, and the hours are Tuesday through Saturday, from 12 pm to 4 pm. Presently, the museum and gift shop employs one part-time curator

=== Museum history ===
The Yup'ik Museum as the Bethel Museum got its start thanks to a $5000.00 grant awarded to the City of Bethel in 1965, as part of Alaska's Purchase Centennial, celebrating 100 years of the purchase of Alaska from Russia. The original museum was located in a log house, made with trees cut and shipped downriver from Bethel by barge. By 1968, the Bethel Council on the Arts managed the museum. The City of Bethel took over management of the museum again, and the objects were moved into a new log cabin. On July 4, 1970, it opened and was renamed the Yugtarvik Regional Museum. The log cabin was gutted by fire in 1980, damaging both the building and collection. It was broken into several times since opening and closed periodically for lack of volunteer staff. In 1995, with the opening of the new YPCC the museum was moved to AVCP and renamed the Yupiit Piciryarait Museum.

=== Exhibition ===
The museum has three galleries. Two galleries display the permanent exhibits of the Yup'ik (and Cup'ik) and the Alaskan Athabaskans of the Yukon-Kuskokwim Delta in ancient and contemporary times. The third gallery is reserved for temporary exhibits that changes every 3 months that include some Native collections.

The museum has housed numerous temporary exhibits in order to stimulate cultural education and honor the lives of generations past. The museum's first exhibit is the Smithsonian Institution's "Crossroads Alaska". Ann Fienup-Riordan's Agayuliyararput (Our Way of Making Prayer): The Living Tradition of Yup'ik Masks exhibit opened in 1996 at the museum.

=== Museum gift shop ===
The Yup'ik Museum Gift Shop specializes in Alaska Native art work of the region and with the museum operated by the Association of Village Council Presidents, Inc. (AVCP).

The Association of Village Council Presidents, Inc. (AVCP) is the recognized tribal organization and non-profit Alaska Native regional corporation and operates the gift shop But, the Calista Corporation is a for-profit corporation business corporation and was formed at a meeting of the AVCP in Bethel on January 3, 1972, as a direct result of Alaska Native Claims Settlement Act (ANCSA) of 1971. The Association of Village Council Presidents is interested in increasing the connections between this facility and the surrounding villages.

== Consortium Library ==
The Consortium Library is a library consortium managed in partnership among the City of Bethel, UAF and statewide library services. The library incorporates the university of UAF's Kuskokwim Campus library and the City of Bethel community library, and includes a reading room overlooking a small pond, a children's reading room and a Yup'ik room which houses special collections relating to the Yup'ik culture.

== See also ==
- Alaska Native Heritage Center
- Alutiiq Museum
- List of museums in Alaska
- Yup'ik clothing
