= Pamyua =

Musical group from Anchorage, Alaska

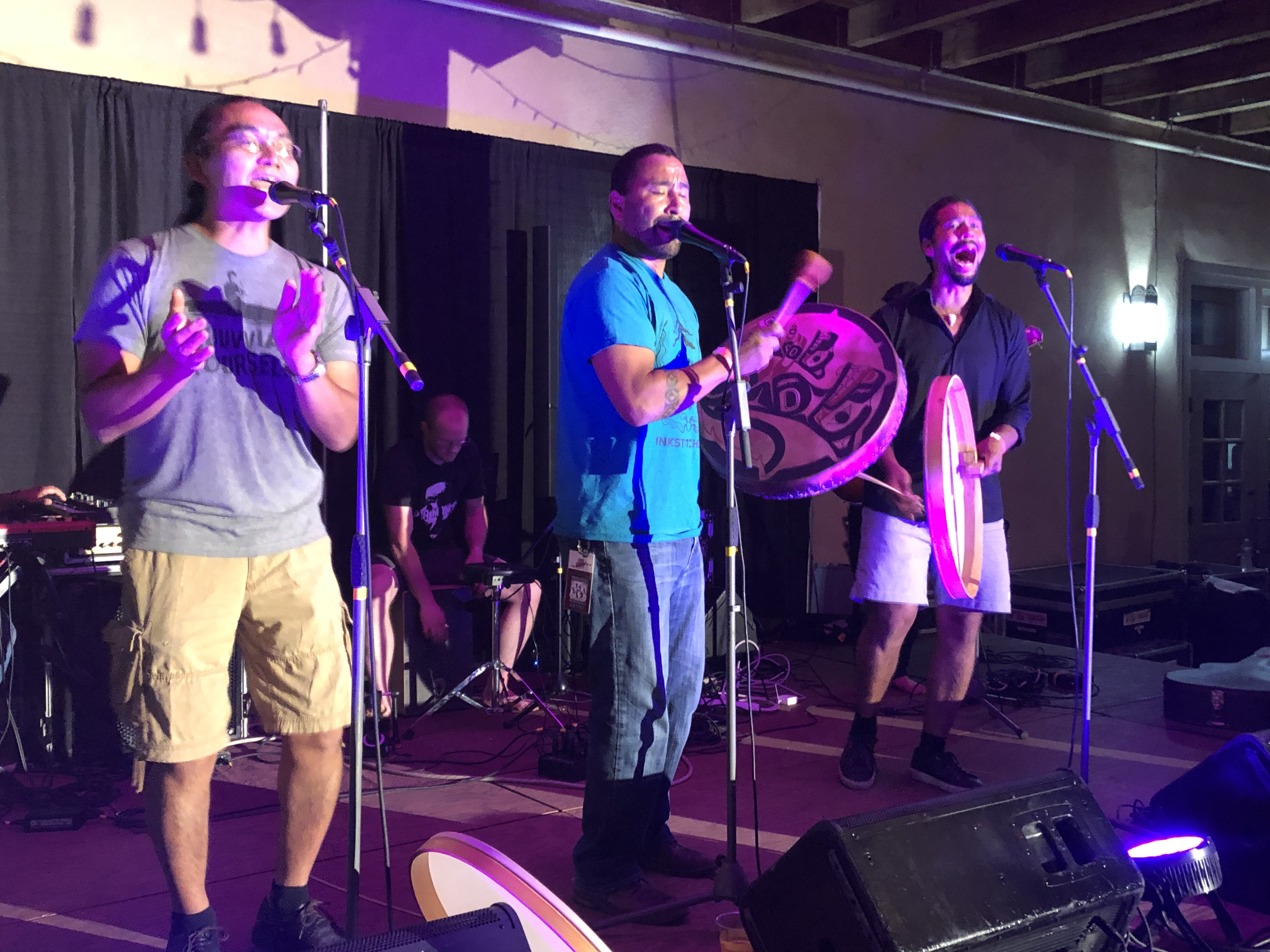
- Pamyua in 2019

Background information
- Genres: Inuit music; folk; tribal; soul
- Years active: 1995–present
- Members: Stephen Blanchett; Phillip Blanchett; Karina Møller; Ossie Kairaiuak
- Website: pamyua.com

Pamyua (/ˈpʌmjoʊ.ə/ PUM-yoh-ə); literally: "its tail" in Yup'ik from pamyuq "tail of animal or kayak; chorus of song; upper stern-piece of kayak") is a Yup'ik-Inuit musical group from Anchorage in Alaska.

== Overview ==
Brothers Stephen Qacung Blanchett and Phillip Blanchett, of Yup'ik and African-American descent, formed Pamyua in 1995 with the goal of combining and preserving their cultural and religious backgrounds through music. Pamyua's music is self-described as "tribal funk", "world music" and "Inuit soul music", drawing inspiration from Russian Orthodox chants, traditional Inuit music, R&B and most notably South African male choral group, Ladysmith Black Mambazo. An early influence was the African American gospel played in their father's church in Wasilla, Alaska. Most of their songs are based on traditional Yupik, Inuit and Greenlandic chants, but the group is well known for reinterpreting them in modern styles, such as the song "Cayauqa Nauwa", which has been performed a cappella (mengluni, 1998) and with Pacific Islander influences (Caught in the Act, 2003), as well as traditionally (Drums of the North, 2005). Integral to their staged performances is instrumentation, such as the Cauyaq drum, and mask dancing which evokes and honors traditional Yup'ik dancing.

Pamyua has toured across the United States and the world, performing at many world music festivals. In 2003, Pamyua won the Record of the Year Nammy for their album Caught in the Act. They performed at the opening celebration of the National Museum of the American Indian in 2004. The National Museum of the American Indian also released a compilation recording featuring the music of Pamyua.

Pamyua has provided background music for Flying Wild Alaska. They also performed the theme song for the 2019 PBS animated series Molly of Denali.

== Discography ==
- Mengluni (1998)
- Verses (Apallut) (2001)
- Caught in the Act (2003)
- Drums of the North (2005)
- Side A/Side B (2012)

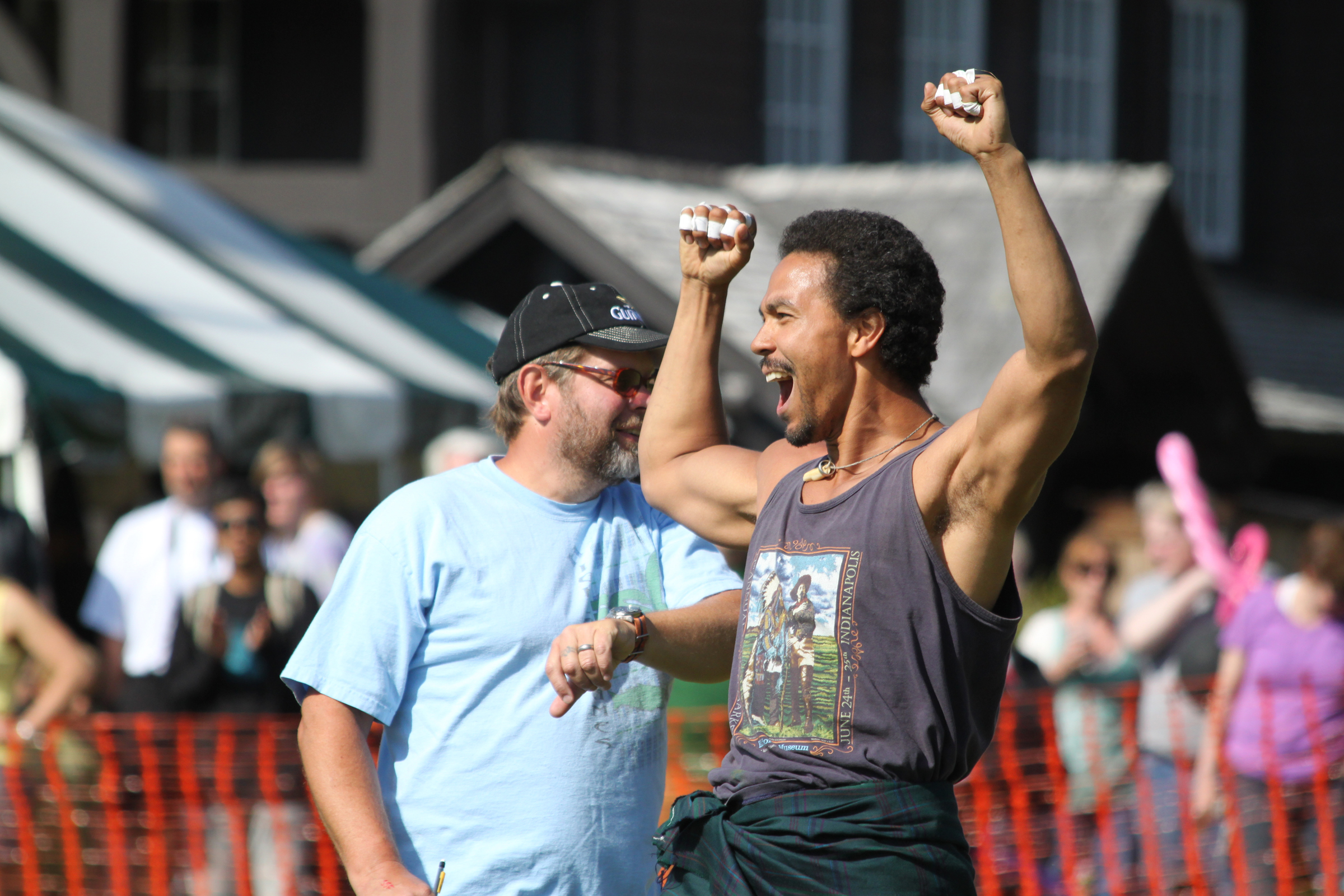
Phillip Blanchett in August 2014. He participated in the highland games in Sitka and is shown celebrating a successful caber toss.
