= Kashunamiut School District =

School district in Alaska, United States

Coordinates: 61°31′51″N 165°35′07″W

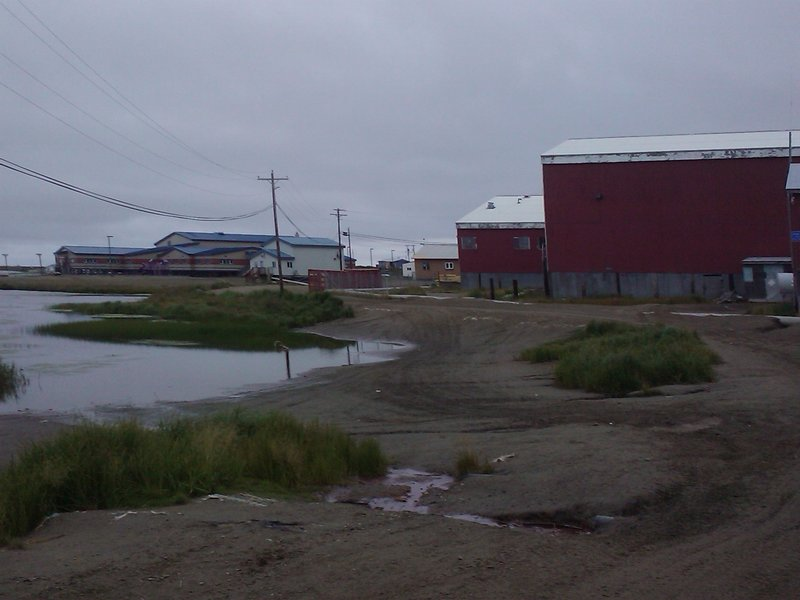

Location
- Chevak, Alaska; United States

District information
- Type: Public
- Grades: Pre-K–12
- NCES District ID: 0200005

Students and staff
- Students: 320
- Teachers: 22.0
- Staff: 46.85
- Student–teacher ratio: 14.55

Other information
- Website: www.chevakschool.org

The Kashunamiut School District is a school district within the village of Chevak, Alaska. The school district is composed of a single school which teaches grades Kindergarten to High School. The school's mascot is a "comet". The district served approximately 200 students in the 2008–09 academic year and has a 58% graduation rate. English and Cup'ik bilingual education is done at this school.

== District Leader ==
Lillian Olson, a longtime Chevak resident and educator, is the district superintendent. She is an advocate of Cup'ik culture playing a central part of education and daily life at Chevak school for years.

== School Board ==
The board meets once a month on Wednesday evenings at 7pm in the school's library. Monthly reports are given to the board by the Superintendent, Business Office, Resource Director, School Principal and Activities Director. Other reports are given as needed. Public is welcome to attend.

Chairman: Jeremy Tuluk

Vice Chairman: Dorothy Chayalkun

Treasurer: Skye Chayalkun

Secretary: Clifford Paniyak

Member: John Atchak

== Teacher Salary ==
The salary schedule for certified staff for 2008-09 ranged from $41,715 to $66,435.

== Academic Progress ==
In the 2008–09 academic year, the district did not meet Annual Yearly Progress criteria established by the Alaska Department of Education & Early Development. The district was placed on AYP Level 4, which requires that, in addition to implementation of a school improvement plan and offering school choice where available, corrective action must also be taken.

Of all students in grades 3 through 10 that were tested in the 2008–09 academic year, 41% were proficient in language arts and 47% were proficient in mathematics.

== See also ==
- KCUK
- Chevak Cup’ik language
