= Qargi =

Traditional dwelling type of the Arctic

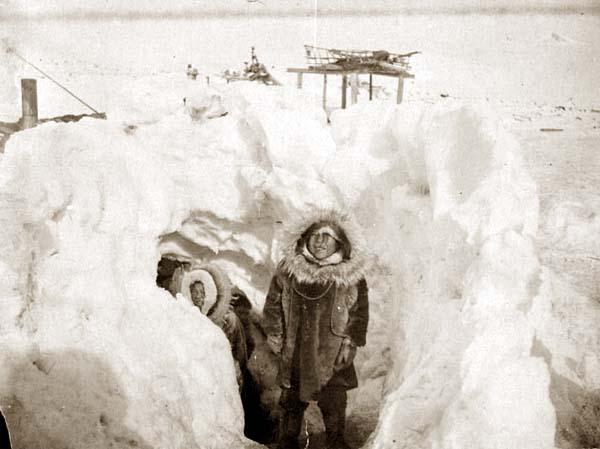
Qargi in the village of Stebbins, Alaska 1900

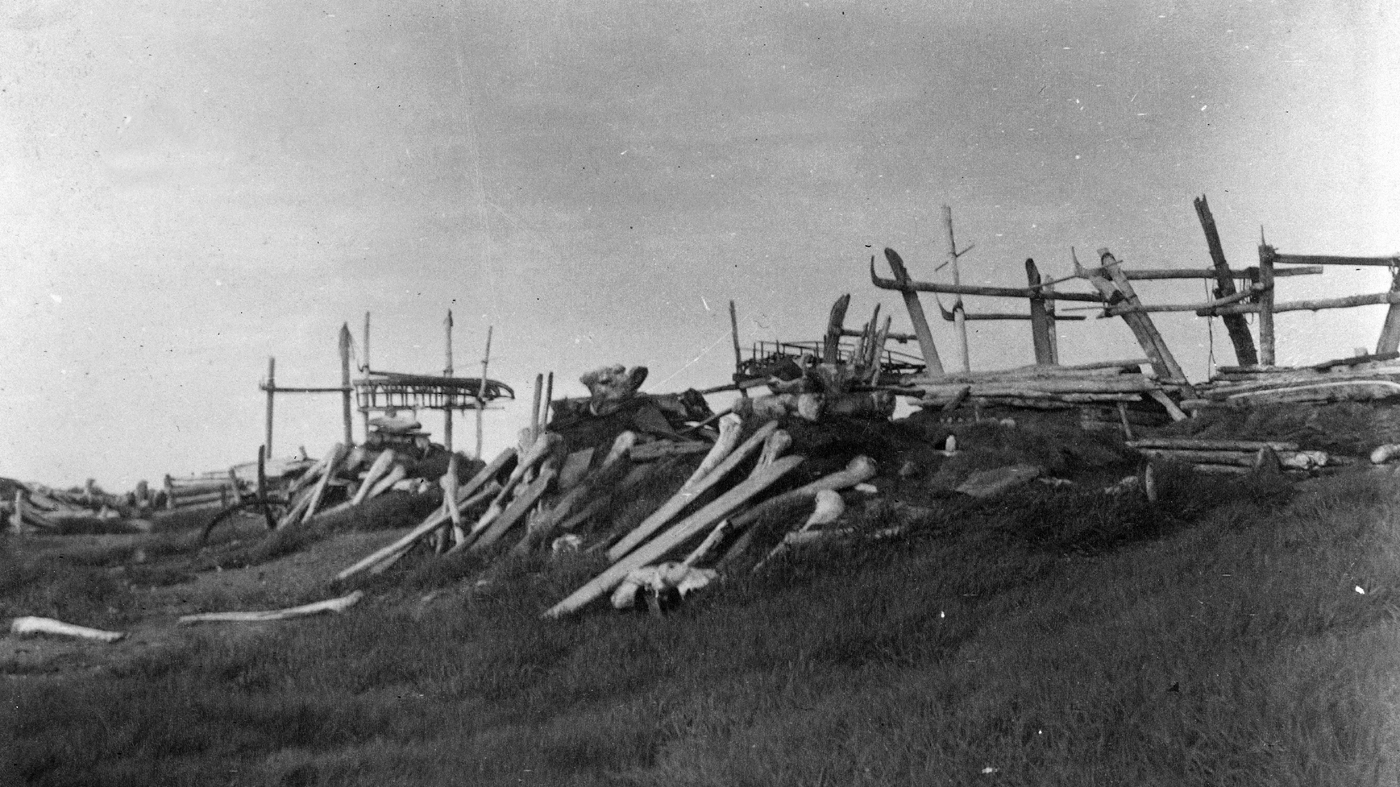
Semi-underground men's community house (Qargi) with bowhead whale bones, Tikiġaġmiut, Point Hope, Alaska, 1885

Qargi (Inupiaq: [qɑɻɣi]), Qasgi or Qasgiq (by the Yup'iks), Qaygiq (by the Cup'iks), Kashim (by the Russians), Kariyit, a traditional large semi-subterranean men's community house' (or "communal men's house, men's house, ceremonial house, council house, dance house, communal gathering place") of the Yup'ik and Inuit, also Deg Hit'an Athabaskans (at Anvik, Alaska), was used for public and ceremonial occasions and as a men's residence. The Qargi was the place where men built their boats, repaired their equipment, took sweat baths, educated young boys, and hosted community dances. Here people learned their oral history, songs and chants. Young boys and men learned to make tools and weapons while they listened to the traditions of their forefathers.

The qargi was almost always a separate building because the dwellings were not large enough to hold very many men. The qargi was a combination courthouse, church, workshop, dance hall, and received center, two or three times the size of a typical house. It was the place where the storytelling, dancing, singing, and games (high-kick games) that so enriched Yupik and Inuit life took place. The qargi was a communal building in which women were usually not permitted.

Prior to the arrival of Christian missionaries in the 1890s, every Inupiaq settlement had one or more of these ceremonial houses.

== Naming ==
Language	singular	dual	plural
Naukan Yupik	Qaygi		
Central Alaskan Yup'ik	Qasgi / Qasgiq		Qasgit
Chevak Cup’ik	Qaygiq		Qaygit
Nunivak Cup'ig	Kiiyar		
Inupiaq (Alaskan Inuit)	Qargi	Qargik	Qargich / Qargit
Inupiaq (Little Diomede)	Qaġsriq	Qaġsrik	Qaġsrit
Inupiaq (King Island)	Qagzriq	Qagzrik	Qagzrit
Inuvialuk (Western Canadian Inuit)	Qadjgiq		
Inuktitut (Eastern Canadian Inuit)	Qaggiq ᖃᒡᒋᖅ		
Kalaallisut (West Greenland Inuit)	Qassi		

== School ==
In many Iñupiat communities the qargi was the first institution to vanish as churches and schools became the dominant forces of change. At present, Iñupiat elders have no responsibility for the formal education of young Iñupiat.

Before 1950, formal education for students in Chevak, Alaska took place in the qaygiq, and in the homes of the people. The information taught to students in the qaygiq included history, values, rules, regulations, and survival methods.

== See also ==
- Bladder Festival
