= Inu-Yupiaq =

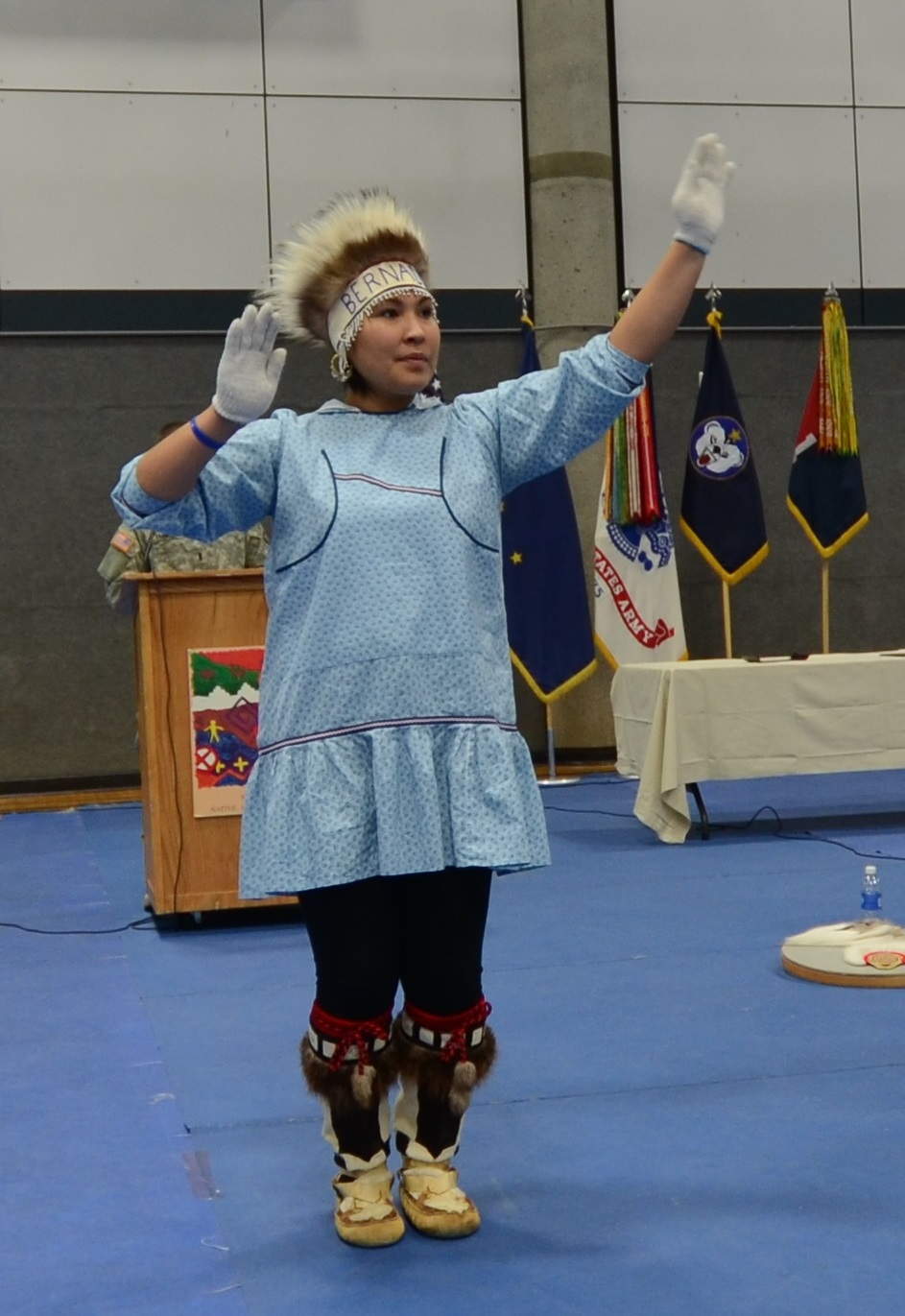
Inu-Yupiaq dancer performing in a kuspuk.

Inu-Yupiaq is a dance group at the University of Alaska, Fairbanks that performs a fusion of Iñupiaq and Yup’ik Eskimo motion dance.

The Inu-Yupiaq Dance Group was formed in 1995. The songs and dances presented are forms of "Eskimo motion dancing" representing a number of different Alaska Native cultures. The group formed in response to the need for an Eskimo dancing group in Fairbanks.

Native dance is a part of the Inupiaq culture, And "song duels" were a traditional part of the cultures of the Inupiaq and the St. Lawrence Island Yupik People of north and northwestern Alaska.

== Eskimo Songs in brief ==
Eskimo songs are sung with voices and circular drums. These drums can be made with wood, ivory, antler, a sea mammal's stomach or bladder, parachute material, or non-rip nylon. Iñupiaq and Yup’ik Eskimo songs and dancers are similar, but have their differences.

Iñupiaq Eskimo songs are usually consisted of two or three parts, usually song together. The first part is sung with a soft drum beat. The second part is sung same as the first, but with a harder drum beat. The third (if any), is the same as the second, but with no voices sung, just the drum beat.

All Eskimo songs tell stories with songs and dances. Some Yup'ik songs are constructed with only the Mengluni, Akuli, and Pamyua. Also, shorter Yup'ik songs are constructed with only the Mengluni and Pamyua.

Yup'ik Eskimo songs are more complex and longer. Here is a diagram of a typical Yup'ik Eskimo song.

    Mengluni [meng loony] or Ciuqlia [Jew q ła] (The Beginning)
       A - Voice and soft drum beat
       h - Very similar to A, but a harder drum beat

    Apallum  Ciuqlia [ab aa łoom Jew q ła] (The first verse)
       B - This is modernly called the verse.  This is slightly different than A and h, but continues the story of the song.
       h - Same as 'h' above

    Akuli (a goo lee] (In between)
       A - Same as 'A' above
       h - Same as 'h' above

    Apallum Kinguqlia [ab aa łoom king oo q łia (The second verse)
       C - Similar to B, but continues the story after B.
       h - Same as 'h' above

    Pamyua [bum yoa] (Ending, or its tail)
       C - Same as 'A' above.
       h - Same as 'h' above
