= Messenger Feast =

Celebratory mid-winter festival in Alaska

The Messenger Feast or Kivgiq (Iñupiaq: [kivɣeq]; pronounced in English as KIV-yook), or Kivgiġñiq in Iñupiaq dialect of North Slope Borough, Kivgiqsuat in King Island Iñupiaq, Kevgiq in Yup'ik, is a biannual celebratory mid-winter festival in Alaska traditionally held by Iñupiaq (Tikiġaġmiut, Nunamiut...) and Yup'ik peoples after a strong whale harvest. The most recent Kivgiq was held in February 2025.

It was named for the two messengers sent to invite the guest village to the festival. Two Messengers (kivgak dual kivgaq sg in Iñupaq; kevgak dual kevgaq sg in Yup'ik) would travel from host village to another village to invite the people to the Kivgiq.

Iñupiat people had celebrated Kivgiq for many centuries. The event died out early in the twentieth century, when Presbyterian missionaries in the area tried to eliminate traditional ceremonies. Shamanistic rituals are no longer practiced, although some elders have information about these rites. Song and dance continue to be celebrated by Alaska Natives.

In 1988, after a lapse of more than 70 years, the modern Kivgiq was reconstructed. It is intended to inspire each Iñupiaq with an even stronger collective identity and enhanced ethnic pride. Since the late 20th century, this festival has been held almost every year, but "officially" is held every two or three years in late January or early February. It is called at the discretion of the North Slope Borough Mayor. Kivgiq is an international event that attracts visitors from around the Arctic Circle.

== See also ==
- Nalukataq
- Bladder Festival
- Yup'ik dancing
