= Chevak Cupꞌik dialect =

Cupꞌik dialect of southwestern Alaska, US

Chevak Cupʼik
- Cugtun
- Native to: United States
- Region: Central Alaska (Chevak)
- Ethnicity: Cupʼik
- Language family: Eskaleut: Eskimo; Yupik; Central Alaskan Yupʼik; Chevak Cupʼik
- Early forms: Proto-Eskimo–Aleut: Proto-Eskimo; Proto-Yupik
- Writing system: Latin

Language codes
- ISO 639-3: –
- Glottolog: hoop1234

Chevak Cupʼik or just Cupʼik (and sometimes Cugtun) is a subdialect of the Hooper Bay–Chevak dialect of Yupʼik spoken in southwestern Alaska in the Chevak (Cupʼik, Cevʼaq) by Chevak Cupʼik Eskimos (own name Cupʼit or Cevʼallrarmuit). Speakers of the Chevak subdialect refer to themselves as Cupʼik (as opposed to Yupʼik), while speakers of the Hooper Bay subdialect refer to themselves as Yupʼik (not Cupʼik), as in the Yukon-Kuskokwim dialect.

The Central Alaskan Yupik who live in the village of Chevak call themselves Cupʼik (plural Cupʼit), whereas those who live on Nunivak Island (Nuniwar in Nunivak Cupʼig, Nunivaaq in Central Yupʼik) call themselves Cupʼig (plural Cupʼit), the spelling differences serving as a self-designated cultural identifier between the two groups. In both dialects, the Yupʼik consonant c is pronounced as an English ch. The Cupʼik dialect is readily distinguished from other dialects of Yupʼik by the pronunciation of the Yupʼik "y" sound as a "ch" sound (represented by the letter "c"), and by some fundamental differences in the basic vocabulary.

The oldest fully bilingual person in Chevak is Leo Moses, born in 1933; there are few if any persons born after 1945 who do not speak English.

The first documentation of the Hooper Bay-Chevak dialect (beyond occasional citations) is found in the unpublished notes of Jesuit priests residing at Hooper Bay and Kashunuk in the 1920s and 1930s. Published recognition of Hooper Bay-Chevak as a morphologically distinct dialect of Yupʼik seems to begin with Michael E. Krauss in 1973, although the fundamental differences between the dialects were common knowledge among native speakers. Cup'ik is a critically threatened language, and English the primary language of everyday communication among most of those with knowledge of the language.

== Education ==
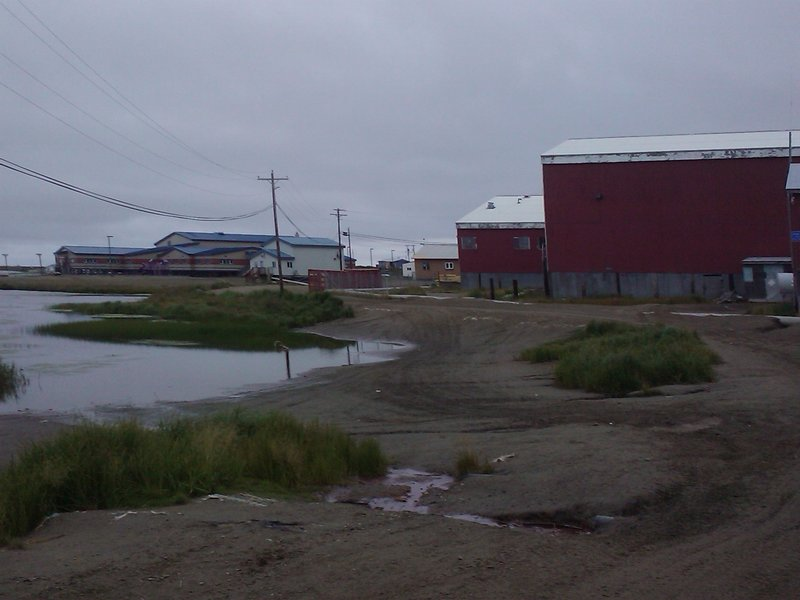
Chevak, the school (blue), lake, and condemned old school (red)

Their unique cultural and linguistic identity has allowed them to form a single-site school district, the Kashunamiut School District, rather than joining a neighboring Yupʼik school district. English and Cupʼik bilingual education is done at this school. There is a tri-language system in Chevak; English, Cupʼik, and a mixture of the two languages.

Before 1950 formal education for students in Chevak took place in the Qaygiq (semi-underground men's community house), and in the homes of the people.

== Vocabulary comparison ==
The comparison of some words in the two dialects.

Yukon-Kuskokwim Yupʼik	Chevak Cupʼik	meaning
elicaraq (Y) / elitnauraq (K)	elicaraq skuularaq (English root)	student
elicarista (Y) / elitnaurista (K)	elicarta skuularta (English root)	teacher
yugnikekʼngaq	aiparnatugaq	friend
yuilquq	cuilquq	the wilderness; tundra
nuussiq	caviggaq	knife (not semi-lunar)
uluaq	kegginalek	ulu, semi-lunar woman's knife
canek	evek	a blade or stalk of grass
ellalluk	ivyuk	rain

== Phonology ==
There are 18 letters used in the Cupʼik alphabet: a c e g i k l m n p q r s t u v w y.

These letters are not used in the Cupʼik alphabet except for certain names: b d f h j o x z.

Vowels:

- Short vowels: a i u e
- Long vowels: aa ii uu
- Diphthongs: ai ui au iu ua ia

Consonants:

- Stops: p t c k q
- Voiced fricatives: v l y g r w
- Voiceless fricatives: vv ll ss gg rr ww
- Voiced nasals: m [m] n [n] ng [ŋ]
- Voiceless nasals: m [m̥] n [n̥] ng [ŋ̊]

== Russian loanwords ==
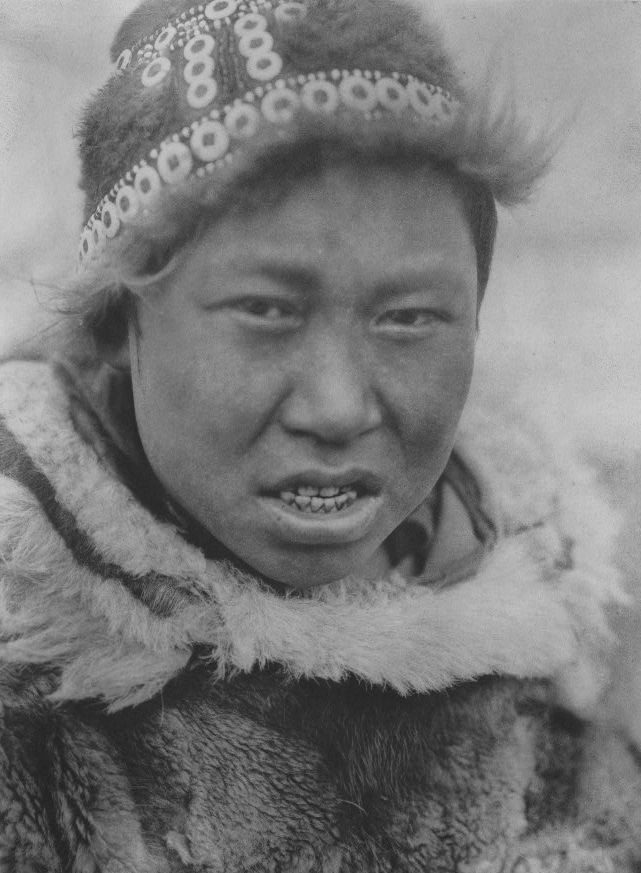
Hooper Bay youth, 1930

The Russian loanwords used in Chevak Cupʼik date from the period of the Russian America (1733–1867).

- caarralaq (< Russian: сахар, romanized: saxar) 'sugar'
- caayuq (< Russian: чай, romanized: čaj) 'tea'
- caanik (< Russian: чайник, romanized: čajnik) 'tea kettle'
- capʼakiq ( < Russian: сапоги, romanized: sapogi) 'shoe'
- cassʼaq (< Russian: часы, romanized: časy) 'clock'
- culunaq (?< Russian: солонина, romanized: solonina 'salted meat') 'salted fish'
- kalantaassaq (< Russian: карандаш, romanized: karandaš) 'pencil'
- kalmaaniq (< Russian: карман, romanized: karman) 'pocket'
- kelipaq (< Russian: хлеб, romanized: xleb) 'bread'
- luussitaq (< Russian: лошадь, romanized: lošadʹ) 'horse'
- massʼlaq (< Russian: масло, romanized: maslo) 'butter; margarine'
- missuulleq (< Russian: мешок, romanized: mešok) 'burlap sack'
- mulukʼuuq (< Russian: молоко, romanized: moloko) 'milk'
- multʼuuq (< Russian: молоток, romanized: molotok) 'hammer'
- palʼtuuk (< Russian: пальто, romanized: palʹto) 'coat; jacket'
- pelatekaq (< Russian: палатка, romanized: palatka) 'tent'
- putuskaq (< Russian: подушка, romanized: poduška) 'pillow'
- spickaq : (< Russian: спичка, romanized: spička) 'match'
- tiititsaaq/tiissitsaaq (< Russian: тысяча, romanized: tysjača) 'thousand; one thousand dollars'
- yaassiik : (< Russian: ящик, romanized: jaščik) 'box; cardboard box'

== The names of days and months ==
- erneq day
- Agayuneq ('praying') Sunday
- Pekyun ('movement') Monday
- Aipirin ('next') Tuesday
- Pingayirin ('third') Wednesday
- Citamirin ('fourth') Thursday
- Tallimirin ('fifth') Friday
- Maqineq ('steambath') Saturday
- iraluq month
- Agayuulek ('icicles') January
- Nakrutlek ('accurate shooter') February
- Neqlelek ('white front geese') March
- Tunturalek ('reindeer') April
- Cupun ('breaking river ice') May
- Kaugun ('clubbing fish') June
- Essgun ('newly hatched eggs') July
- Putukuarun ('waddling ducks & geese') August
- Amiirairun ('shedding') September
- Cauyaun ('drumming') (in Chevak) / Ipukaqun (in Hooper Bay) October
- Kanruyauciq ('frost') November
- Angunquyugtuun ('big toe') December

== See also ==
- Nunivak Cup'ig language
- Alaska Native Language Center
