= Nunivak Cupʼig language =

Yupik language spoken in Alaska

Nunivak Cup'ig
- Cugtun
- Native to: United States
- Region: Central Alaska, Nunivak Island
- Ethnicity: Cupʼig
- Language family: Eskaleut: Eskimo; Yupik; Central Alaskan Yupʼik; Nunivak Cup'ig
- Early forms: Proto-Eskimo–Aleut: Proto-Eskimo; Proto-Yupik
- Writing system: Latin

Official status
- Official language in: Alaska

Language codes
- ISO 639-3: –
- Glottolog: nuni1254

Nunivak Cup'ig or just Cup'ig (own name Cugtun) is a language or separate dialect of Central Alaskan Yup'ik spoken in Central Alaska at the Nunivak Island by Nunivak Cup'ig people (own name Cup'it or Nuniwarmiut). The letter "c" in the Yup’ik alphabet is equivalent to the English alphabet "ch".

The Central Alaskan Yupik who live on Nunivak Island (Nuniwar in Nunivak Cup'ig, Nunivaaq in Central Yup'ik) call themselves Cup'ig (plural Cup'it). Those who live in the village of Chevak call themselves Cup'ik (plural Cup'it). The name Cup'ig (with g) is used for the Nunivak Island Yup'ik dialect and the name Cup'ik (with k) is used for Hooper Bay-Chevak Yup'ik dialect.

The Cup'ig dialect is threatened. This fact was documented by Dr. Michael E. Krauss of the Alaska Native Language Center at the University of Alaska and is illustrated on the map. In 1975, Krauss indicated, "Some of the children speak the language". Krauss documented continued decline and downgraded the status to "Very few or none of the children speak the language" in 1982.

Today Cup'ig is spoken by elders in the village of Mekoryuk.

== Classification ==
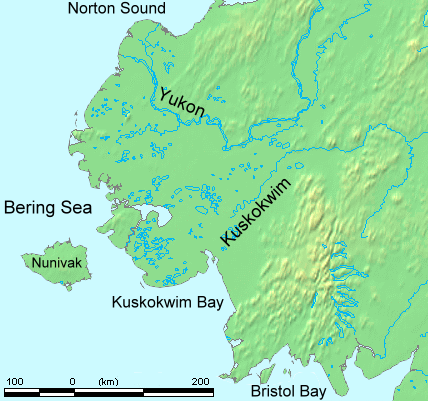
Central Alaskan Yup'ik-speaking areas

- Central Alaskan Yup'ik language
  - Norton Sound dialect is spoken Norton Sound region. Themselves Yup’ik
    - Unaliq subdialect by spoken Unalirmiut (= Atnegmiut, Kuuyuŋmiut, Eŋlutaleġmiut etc.) tribes.
    - Kotlik subdialect by spoken Pastulirmiut tribe
  - General Central Yup’ik dialect or Yugtun is spoken in Nelson Island, the Yukon, the Bristol Bay regions, and Kuskokwim. Themselves Yup’ik (Yukon) or Yupiaq (Kuskokwim).
  - Egegik Yupik is spoken Egegik and Egegik Bay. Themselves Yup’ik
  - Hooper Bay-Chevak Cup’ik is spoken Hooper Bay and Chevak areas. Themselves Cup’ik
  - Nunivak Cup'ig language or dialect is spoken Nunivak Island. Themselves Cup’ig

The comparison of number names in the three dialects

Yukon-Kuskokwim Yup’ik	Hooper Bay-Chevak Cup’ik	Nunivak Cup’ig	Meaning
atauciq	atauciq	ataucir	1
malruk	malruk	malzrug	2
pingayun	pingayun	pingayun	3
cetaman	citaman	cetaman	4
talliman	talliman	talliman	5
arvinglegen / arvinelgen	arvinelgen	arwinleg	6
malrunlegen / malrunelgen	malrunelgen	malzrunleg	7
pingayunlegen / pingayunelgen	pingayunelgen	pingayunleg	8
qulngunritaraan	qulngunritaraq	qulngunrita’ar	9
qula / qulen	qula	qula	10
qula atauciq	qula atauciq	qula-ataucir	11
qula malruk	qula malruk	qula-malzrug	12
qula pingayun	qula pingayun	qula-pingayun	13
akimiarunrita’ar	akimiarunritaraq	akimiarunrita’ar	14
akimiaq	akimiaq	akimiar	15
akimiaq atauciq	akimiaq atauciq	akimiar ataucir	16
akimiaq malruk	akimiaq malruk	akimiar malzrug	17
akimiaq pingayun	akimiaq pingayun	akimiar pingayun	18
yuinaunrita’ar	cuinaunritaraq	cuinaunrita’ar	19
yuinaq	cuinaq	cuinar	20
yuinaq qula / yuinaq qulen	cuinaq qula	cuinar-qula	30
yuinaak malruk / malruk ipiaq (Yukon)	malruk ipiaq	malzrug-ipiar	40
yuinaak malruk qula	malruk ipiaq qula	.	50
yuinaat pingayun / pingayun ipiaq	pingayun ipiaq	pingayun ipiar	60
yuinaat pingayun qula	pingayun ipiaq qula	.	70
yuinaat cetaman	citaman ipiaq	cetaman-ipiar	80
yuinaat cetaman qula	citaman ipiaq qula	talliman ipiar qula	90
yuinaat talliman	talliman ipiaq	talliman ipiar	100
tiissitsaaq	tiititsaaq / tiissitsaaq	tiisiss'ar	1.000
qulen tiissitsaat	.	.	10.000
yuinaat talliman tiissitsaaq	.	.	100.000
miilicaaq	ciicitsaaq	.	1.000.000
tiissitsaaq miilicaaq	.	.	1.000.000.000

== Grammatical numbers ==
The grammatical numbers:

singular	dual	plural	meaning
qusngir	qusngig	qusngit	domestic reindeer
iqalluyagar	iqalluyagag	iqalluyagat	Dolly Varden
qay'ar	qay'ag	qay'at / qass'it	kayak
tuutangayag	tuutangayiigeg	tuutangayit	Canada goose
alpa	alpag	alpat	murre
qimugta	qimugteg	qimugtet	dog

== Education ==
The Cup'ig peoples' only school, the Nuniwarmiut School (P/K-12th grade), lies within the Lower Kuskokwim School District, in the village of Mekoryuk. Built in 1984, the school provides English and Cup’ig bilingual education for 32 students.

Nuniwarmiut Piciryarata Tamaryalkuti, Inc. (literally, "Nunivak Cultural Programs") is a non-profit cultural heritage organization of the Cup'ig Eskimo village of Mekoryuk, its mission being to preserve Nunivak Island Cup'ig culture, traditions, and language. NPT was established in 1999.

== Example phrases ==
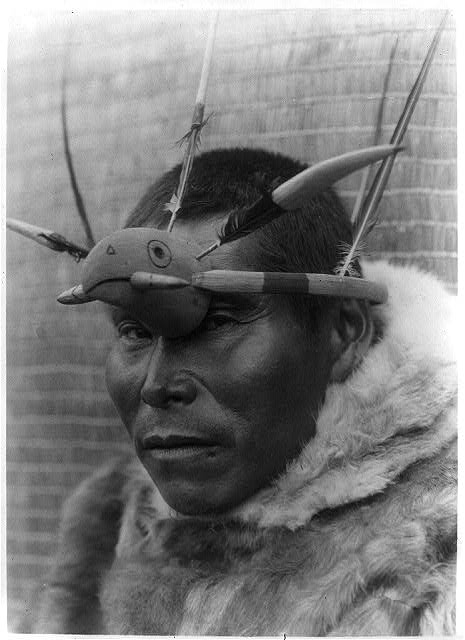
A Nunivak Cup'ig man with raven maskette. The raven (Cup'ig tulukarug) is Ellam Cua or Creator god in the Cup’ig mythology.

- Cangacit? – How are you?
- Canritua – I am fine
- Unuakukegci – Good morning
- Agayunerpakegcikici – Have a very Merry Christmas
- Allrakularakegciluci-llu – And have a Happy New Year
- Taqukat, maklit neqkanka – Seals, bearded seals is my food
- Quyana – Thanks
- Quyana niicugnillua – Thank you for listening to me.
- Quyana naqluki allnganka – Thank you for reading what I wrote.

== Russian loanwords ==
The Russian loanwords used in Nunivak Cup’ig date from the period of the Russian America (1733–1867).

- caarralar (< Rus. сахар) 'sugar'
- caayu (< Rus. чай) 'tea'
- caanig (< Rus. чайник) 'tea kettle'
- cap’akir ( < Rus. сапоги) 'shoe'
- cass’ar (< Rus. часы) 'clock'
- culunar (?< Rus. солонина 'salted meat') 'salted fish'
- kelipar (< Rus. хлеб) 'bread'
- maslar (< Rus. масло) 'butter; margarine'
- miss’ug (< Rus. мешок) 'burlap bag'
- mulut’ug (< Rus. молоток) 'hammer'
- paltug (< Rus. пальто) 'coat; jacket'
- pelatekar (< Rus. палатка) 'tent'
- putuskar (< Rus. подушка) 'pillow'
- tiisiss’ar (< Rus. тысяча) 'thousand; one thousand dollars'
- yaassig : (< Rus. ящик) 'box; cardboard box'

== See also ==
- Chevak Cup’ik language
- Alaska Native Language Center
