= Chevak, Alaska =

Chevak Cevʼaq
- City
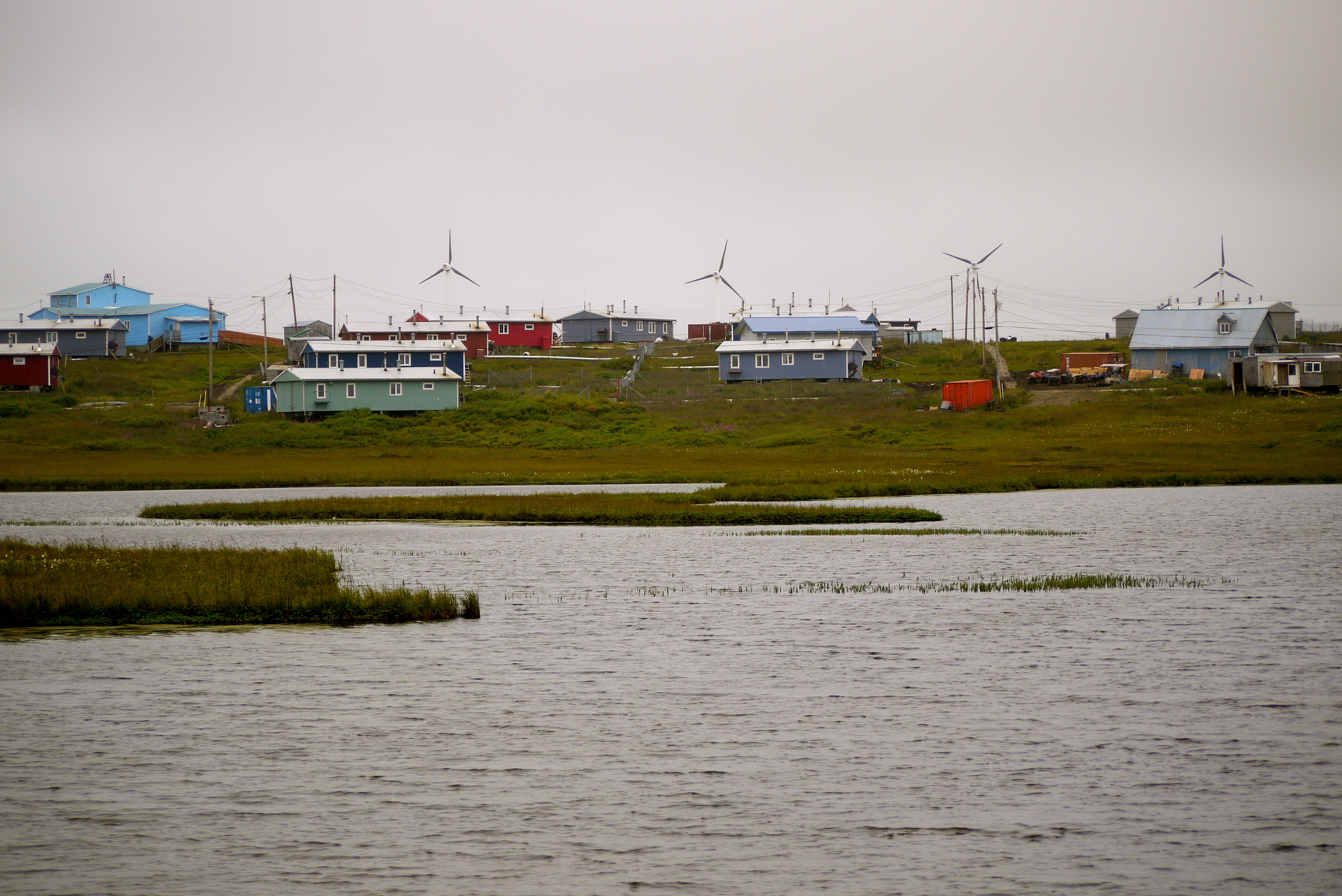
- Chevak, August 2013

- Location in Alaska
- Coordinates: 61°31′40″N 165°34′43″W
- Country: United States
- State: Alaska
- Census Area: Kusilvak
- Incorporated: October 13, 1967

Government
  - Mayor: Phillip Paniyak
  - State senator: Lyman Hoffman (D)
  - State rep.: Conrad McCormick (D)

Area
  - Total: 1.14 sq mi (2.96 km^{2})
  - Land: 1.14 sq mi (2.96 km^{2})
  - Water: 0 sq mi (0.00 km^{2})
- Elevation: 49 ft (15 m)

Population (2020)
  - Total: 951
  - Density: 831.7/sq mi (321.11/km^{2})
  - Demonym: Chevaker
- Time zone: UTC-9 (Alaska (AKST))
  - Summer (DST): UTC-8 (AKDT)
- ZIP code: 99563
- Area code: 907
- FIPS code: 02-13230
- GNIS feature ID: 1400219

Chevak (Cevʼaq , which means "cut-through channel" in Chevak Cup’ik) is a city in Kusilvak Census Area, Alaska, United States. At the 2020 census the population was 951, up from 938 in 2010.

There is a tri-language system in Chevak; English, Cup’ik, and a mixture of the two languages. The people in Chevak speak a dialect of Central Yup'ik, Cup'ik (pr. Chew-pick), and identify themselves as Cup'ik people rather than Yup'ik. This unique identity has allowed them to form a single-site school district, the Kashunamiut School District, rather than joining a neighboring Yup'ik school district. The Cup'ik dialect is distinguished from Yup'ik by the change of "y" sounds into "ch" sounds, represented by the letter "c", and by some words that are completely different from Yup'ik words.

== Geography ==
Chevak is located at 61°31′40″N 165°34′43″W (61.527673, -165.578702) in the Yukon-Kuskokwim Delta region of southwest Alaska, approximately 6 miles from the Bering Sea coastline, 18 miles east of Hooper Bay and 26 miles south of Scammon Bay. Transportation into, and out of, Chevak is by air or water, or regional ice roads in the winter. As with many communities in Alaska, Chevak is not connected to the national road network.

According to the United States Census Bureau, the city has a total area of 1.2 square miles (3.1 km^{2}), of which, 1.1 square miles (2.8 km^{2}) of it is land and 0.04 square miles (0.10 km^{2}) of it (1.71%) is water.

== Infrastructure and utilities ==
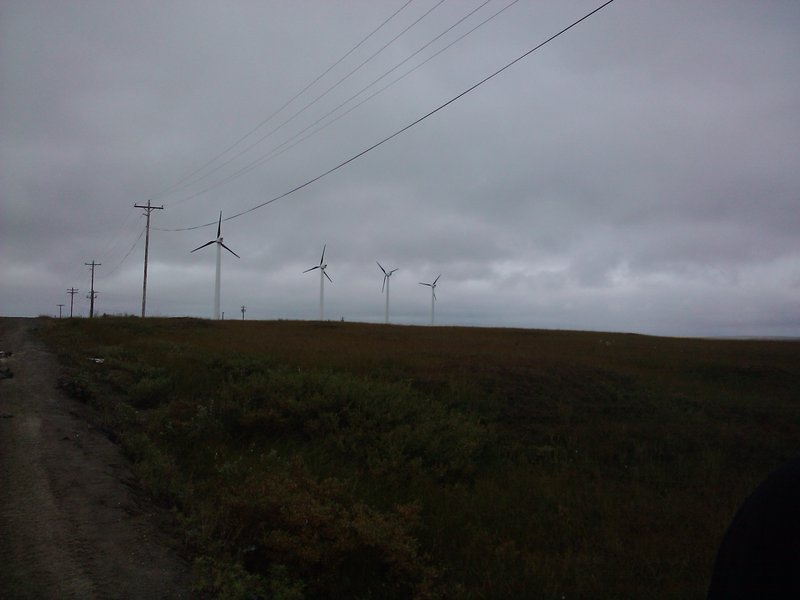
Wind turbine farm in Chevak

Chevak is powered by four 30-meter-tall wind turbines. The wind generated in Chevak is classified as "Class 6 – Outstanding", and is owned and operated by AVEC (Alaska Villages Electric Cooperative).

In addition, electrical power is supplied by four diesel generators capable of supplying up to a combined 1828 kilowatts of electricity year-round, with the tank farm storing up to 302,000 gallons of diesel fuel. This, in addition to the 400 kilowatts generated by the wind turbines, gives Chevak’s electrical grid a total capacity of 2228 kilowatts.

As of 2022, all buildings in Chevak have running water and piped sewage, supported by a central water treatment facility built in 1984, and a central wastewater treatment plant built in 2001. An outage, due to the old school fire in 2021, affected service to the eastern half of Chevak, with many residents forced to resort back to honey buckets as toilets.

Internet access is provided by GCI via their TERRA microwave network. There is 3G cellular coverage as well as broadband available for residents and businesses.

== Demographics ==
Historical population
Census	Pop.	Note	%±
1950	230		—
1960	315		37.0%
1970	387		22.9%
1980	466		20.4%
1990	598		28.3%
2000	765		27.9%
2010	938		22.6%
2020	951		1.4%
U.S. Decennial Census

=== 2020 census ===
As of the 2020 census, Chevak had a population of 951. The median age was 24.8 years. 39.7% of residents were under the age of 18 and 7.3% of residents were 65 years of age or older. For every 100 females there were 112.8 males, and for every 100 females age 18 and over there were 116.2 males age 18 and over.

0.0% of residents lived in urban areas, while 100.0% lived in rural areas.

There were 208 households in Chevak, of which 65.4% had children under the age of 18 living in them. Of all households, 35.1% were married-couple households, 28.8% were households with a male householder and no spouse or partner present, and 21.6% were households with a female householder and no spouse or partner present. About 19.2% of all households were made up of individuals and 4.3% had someone living alone who was 65 years of age or older.

There were 243 housing units, of which 14.4% were vacant. The homeowner vacancy rate was 0.0% and the rental vacancy rate was 10.0%.

Racial composition as of the 2020 census
Race	Number	Percent
White	18	1.9%
Black or African American	1	0.1%
American Indian and Alaska Native	892	93.8%
Asian	1	0.1%
Native Hawaiian and Other Pacific Islander	0	0.0%
Some other race	0	0.0%
Two or more races	39	4.1%
Hispanic or Latino (of any race)	1	0.1%

=== 2000 census ===
As of the census of 2000, there were 765 people, 167 households, and 129 families residing in the city. The population density was 668.6 inhabitants per square mile (258.1/km^{2}). There were 190 housing units at an average density of 166.1 per square mile (64.1/km^{2}). The racial makeup of the city was 3.66% White, 90.46% Native American, 0.13% from other races, and 5.75% from two or more races. 0.65% of the population were Hispanic or Latino of any race.

There were 167 households, out of which 64.1% had children under the age of 18 living with them. 41.3% were married couples living together, 20.4% had a female householder with no husband present, and 22.2% were non-families. 19.2% of all households were made up of individuals, and 0.6% had someone living alone who was 65 years of age or older. The average household size was 4.58 and the average family size was 5.38.

In the city, the age distribution of the population shows 51.8% under the age of 18, 8.8% from 18 to 24, 23.9% from 25 to 44, 11.5% from 45 to 64, and 4.1% who were 65 years of age or older. The median age was 17 years. For every 100 females, there were 113.7 males. For every 100 females age 18 and over, there were 113.3 males.

The median income for a household in the city was $26,875, and the median income for a family was $27,375. Males had a median income of $21,875 versus $18,125 for females. The per capita income for the city was $7,550. About 26.7% of families and 29.5% of the population were below the poverty line, including 32.5% of those under age 18 and 13.3% of those age 65 or over.

== Old Chevak (1940) ==
Historical population
Census	Pop.	Note	%±
1940	43		—
U.S. Decennial Census

Chevak first appeared on the 1940 U.S. Census as an unincorporated native village. At the time it was located above the junction of the Keoklevik & Kashunuk Rivers at an altitude of 7 feet. 61°25′56″N 165°27′03″W In the 1940s, residents relocated 9 miles northwest to a new village due to flooding from high storm tides. The old site became Old Chevak and was abandoned and did not report again on the census.

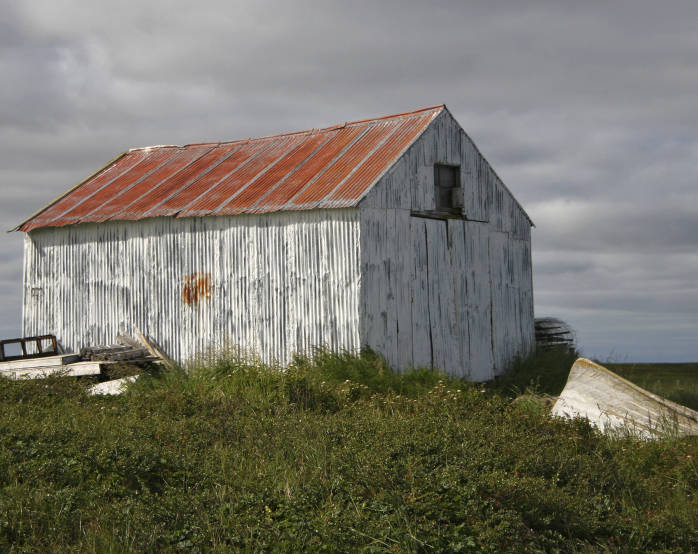
Original trading post on the Keoklevik River at the old town of Chevak, 2006

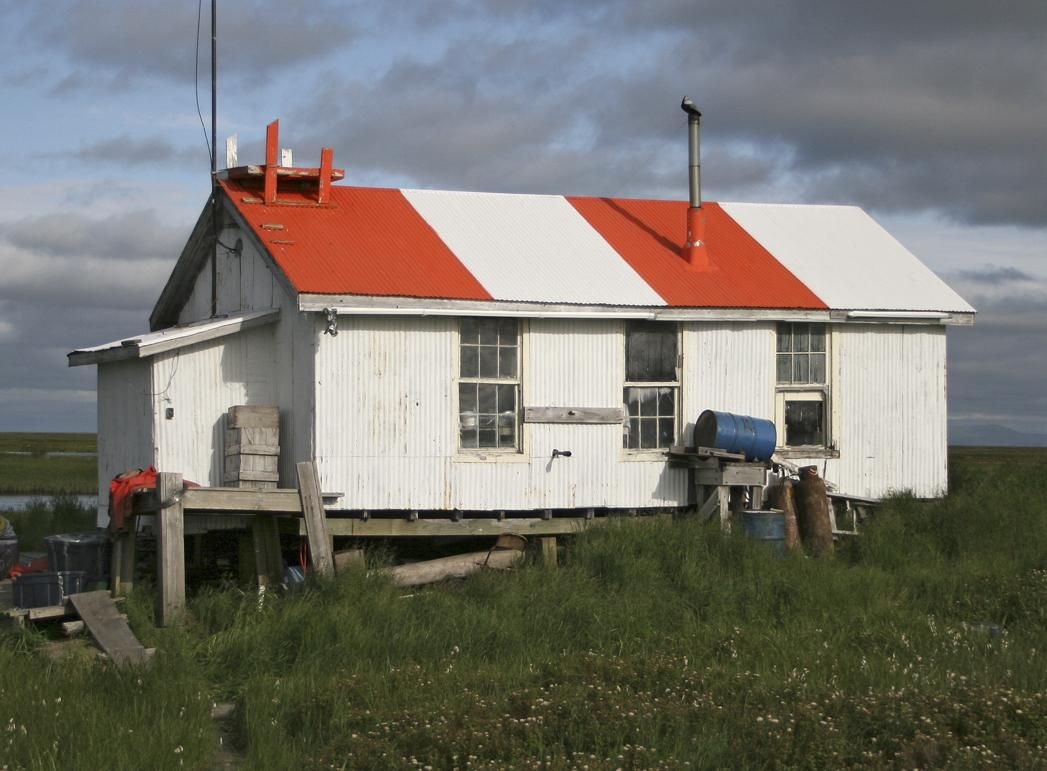
Old town of Chevak on the Kashunuk river

== New Chevak (1950) ==
The new Chevak appeared on the 1950 U.S. Census as an unincorporated village, relocated from its original site 9 miles away on higher ground. It formally incorporated as a city in 1967.

As of 2022, Chevak has a post office, community hall, radio station, three stores, a church, a clinic, a public safety building, and two restaurants. There are no public lodges or hotels in Chevak, although visitors invited by the Traditional Council are often provided housing.

The current Chevak school was built in 2005, and currently serves approximately 360 students via approximately 60 staff. In 2021, the old school, shut down for renovations and removal of toxins such as asbestos, was destroyed in a fire. The old school was planned to be turned into a community center, before its destruction. Two individuals went missing at the time of the fire, which resulted in the Alaska State Troopers launching an investigation. The cause of the fire is still unknown. The Alaska Department of Environmental Conservation is providing 2.5 million dollars in funds towards the cleanup effort and removal of debris from the destroyed school.

== Photo gallery ==
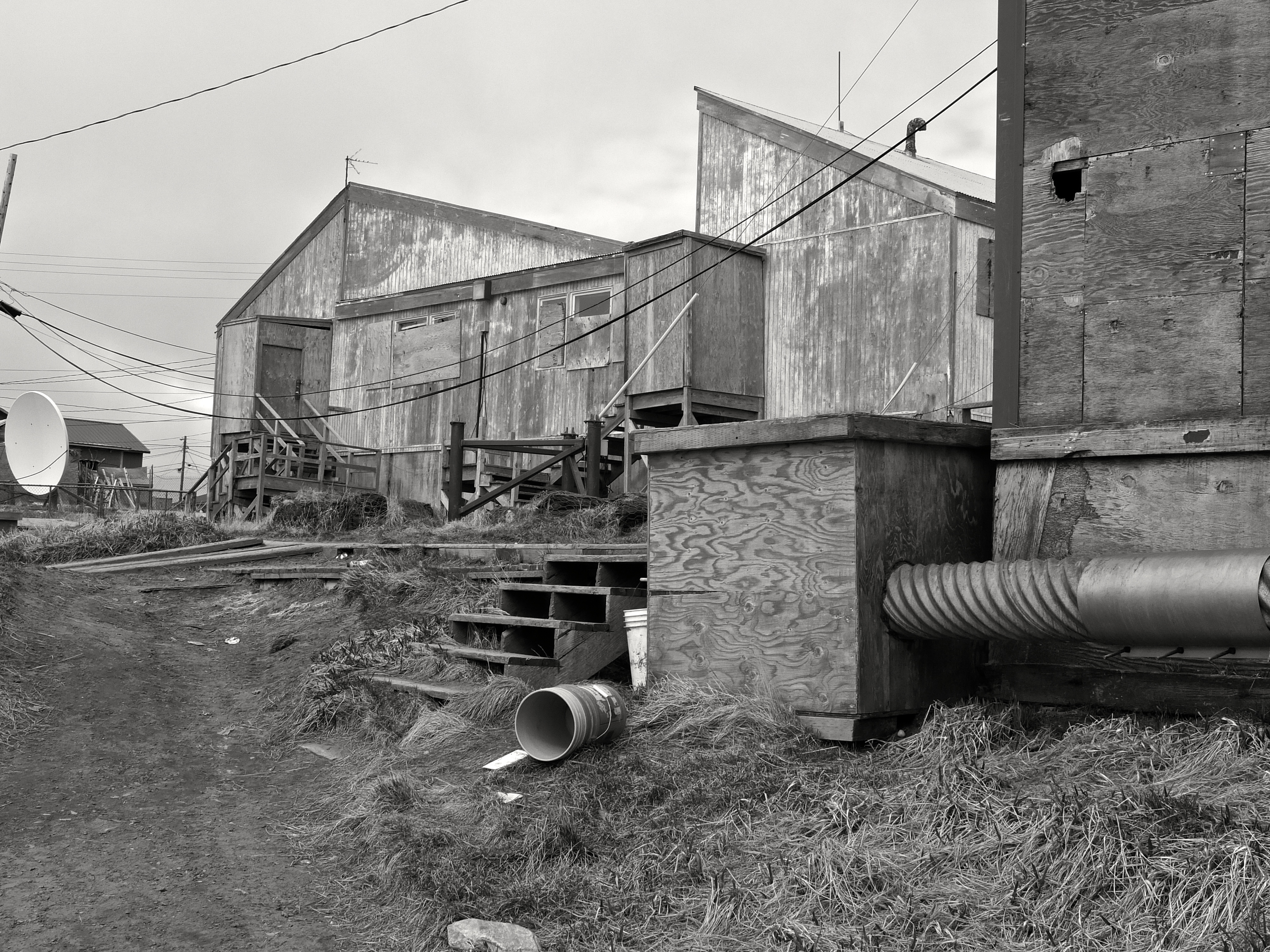
Chevak buildings, 2014

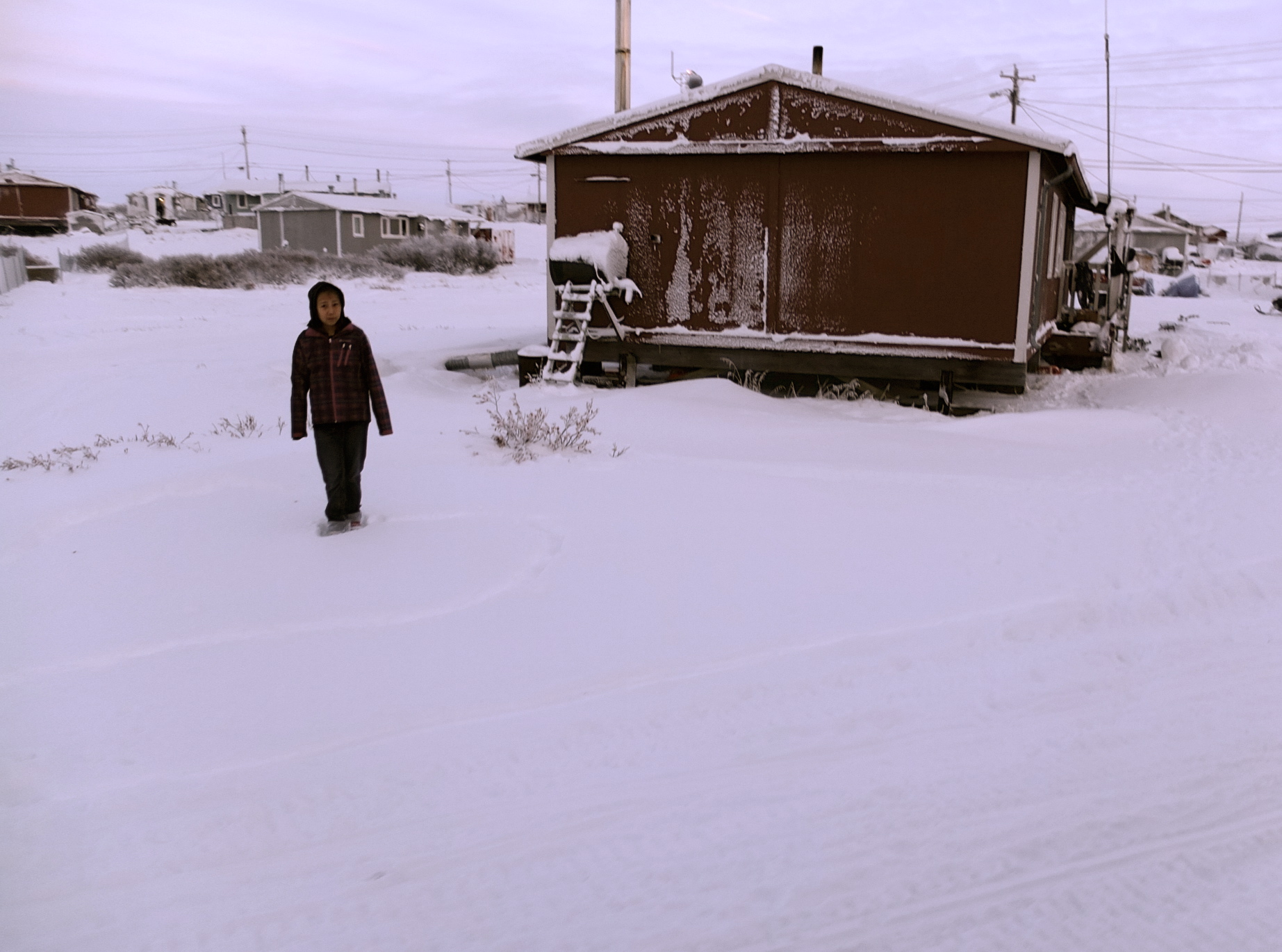
Winter at Chevak, 2013

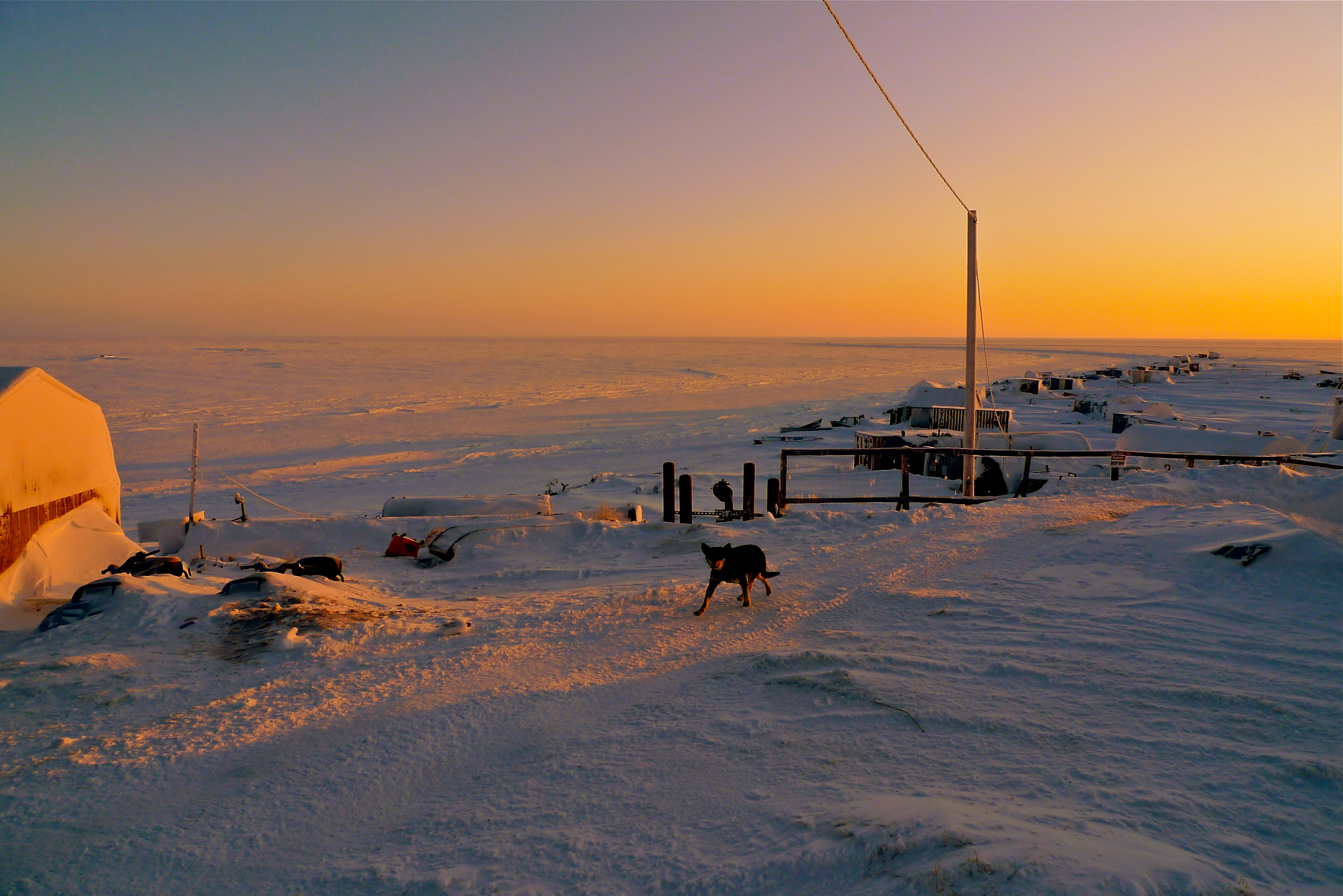
Winter Sunrise at Chevak, 2012

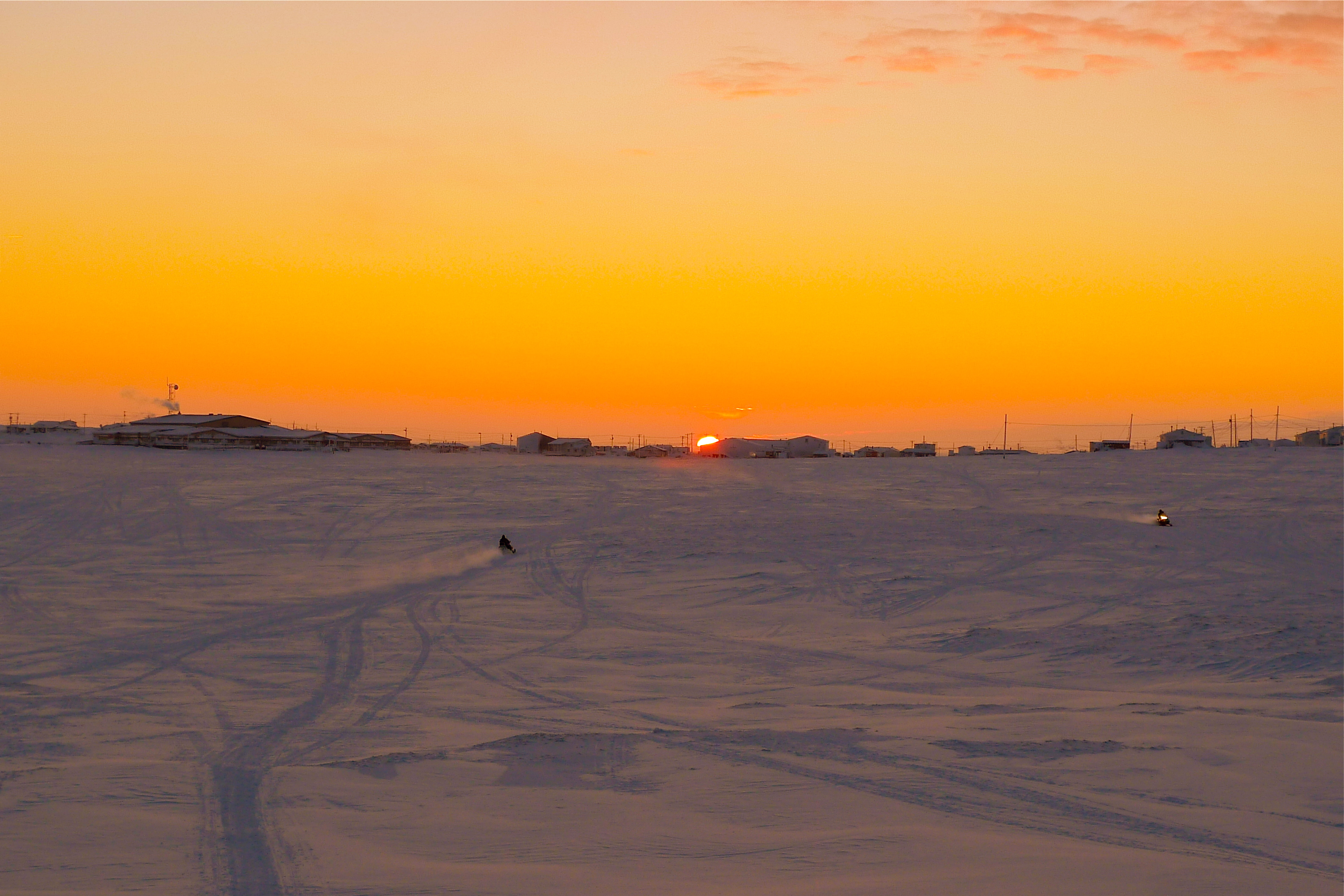
Sunrise at Chevak, 2012

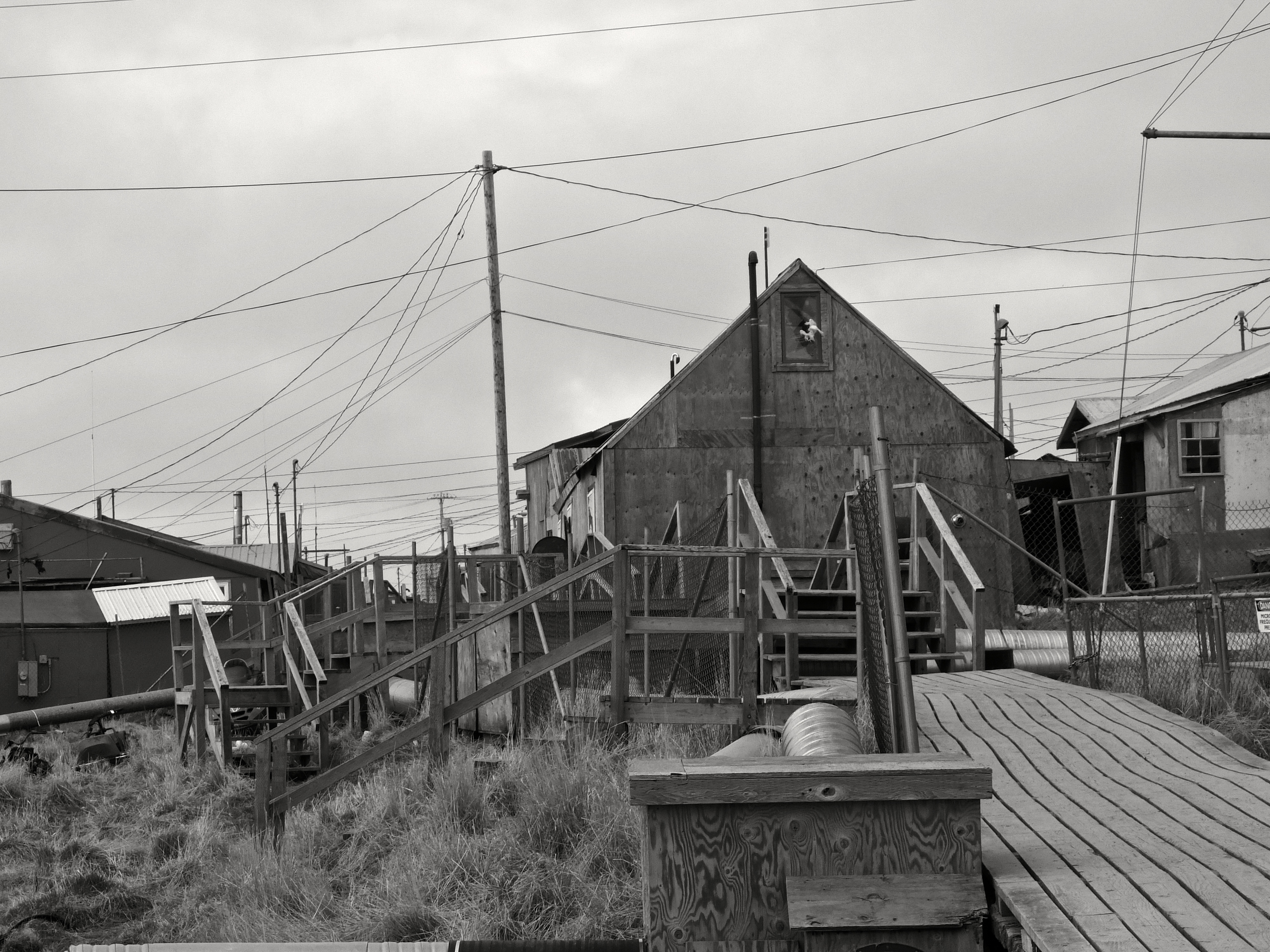
Chevak buildings, 2014

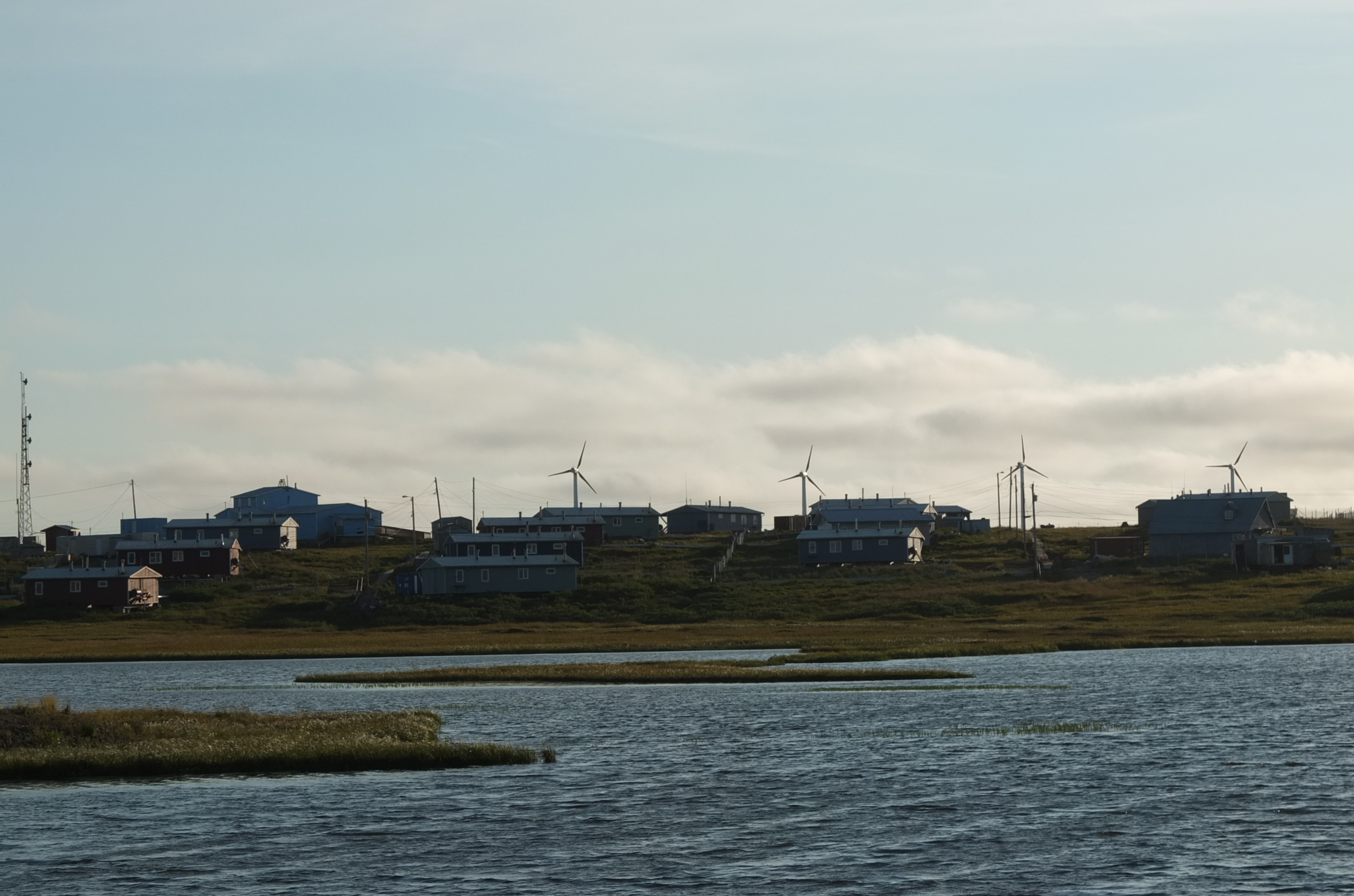
Chevak, August 2012

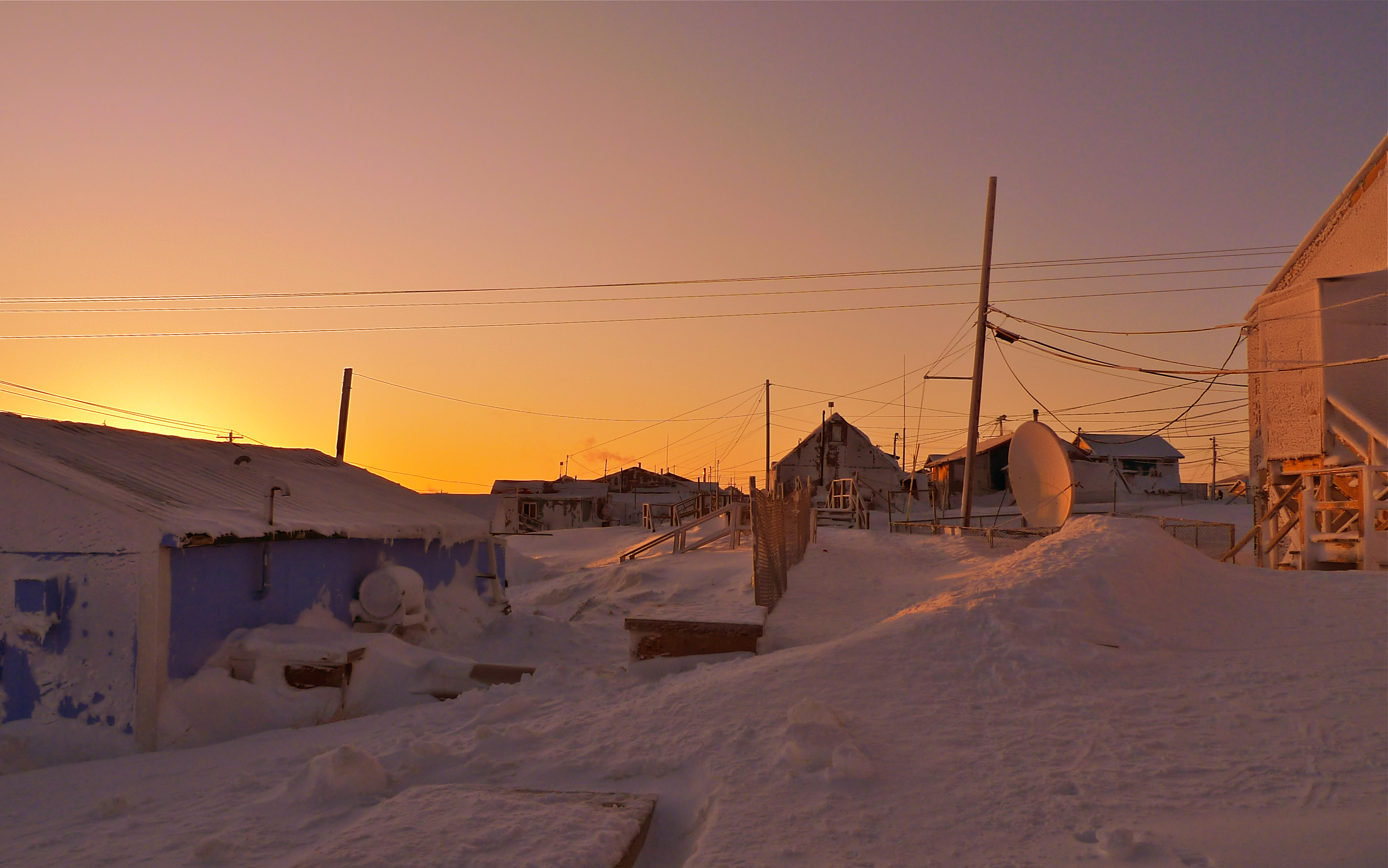
Chevak Winter Sunset at 30 below zero, 2012

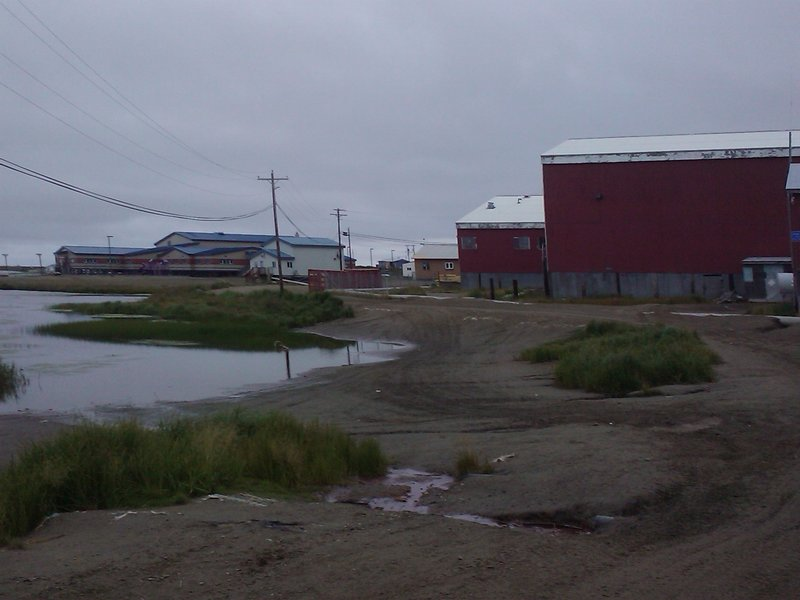
The school (blue), lake, and condemned old school (red)

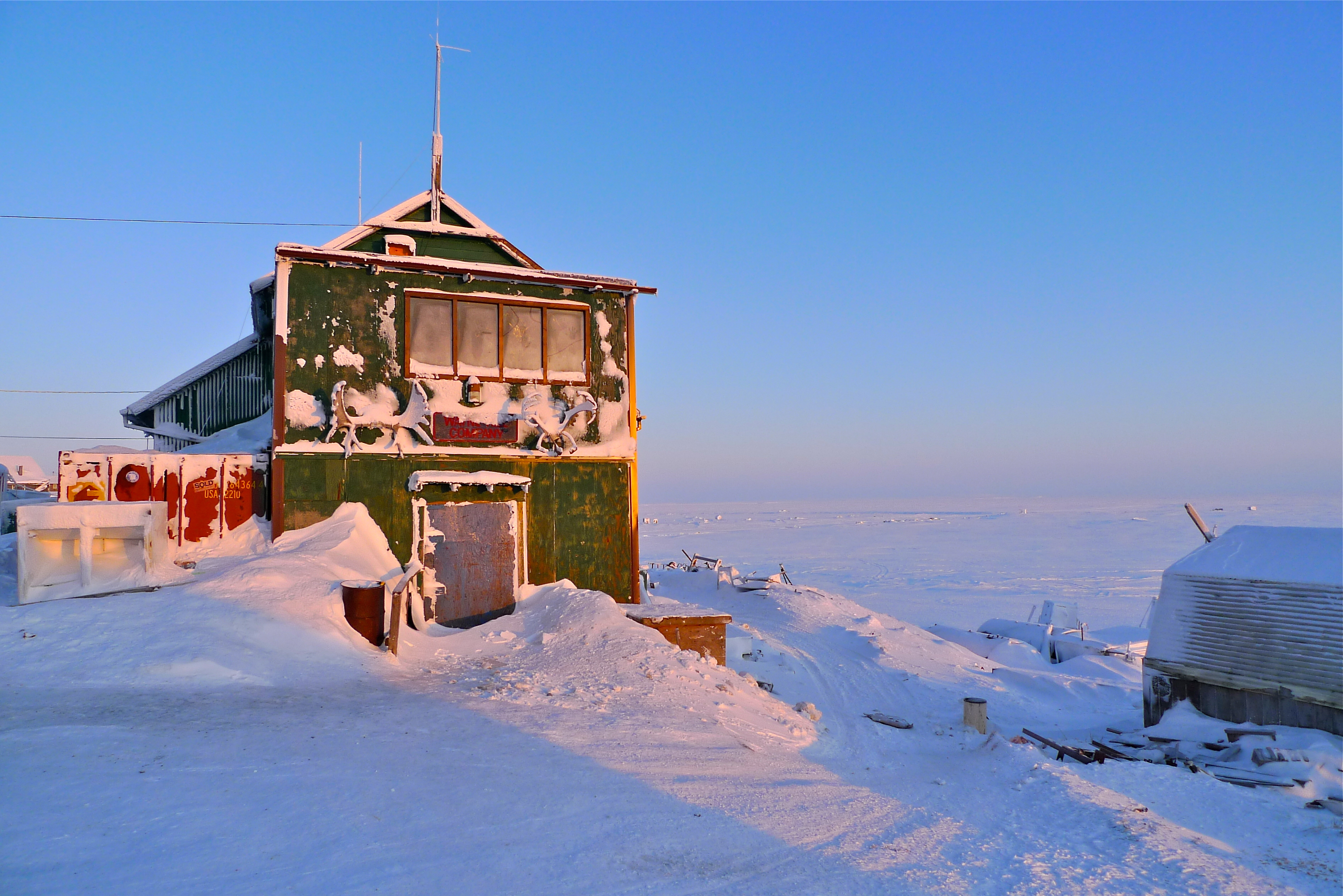
Wayne Hill Store, Chevak, 2012

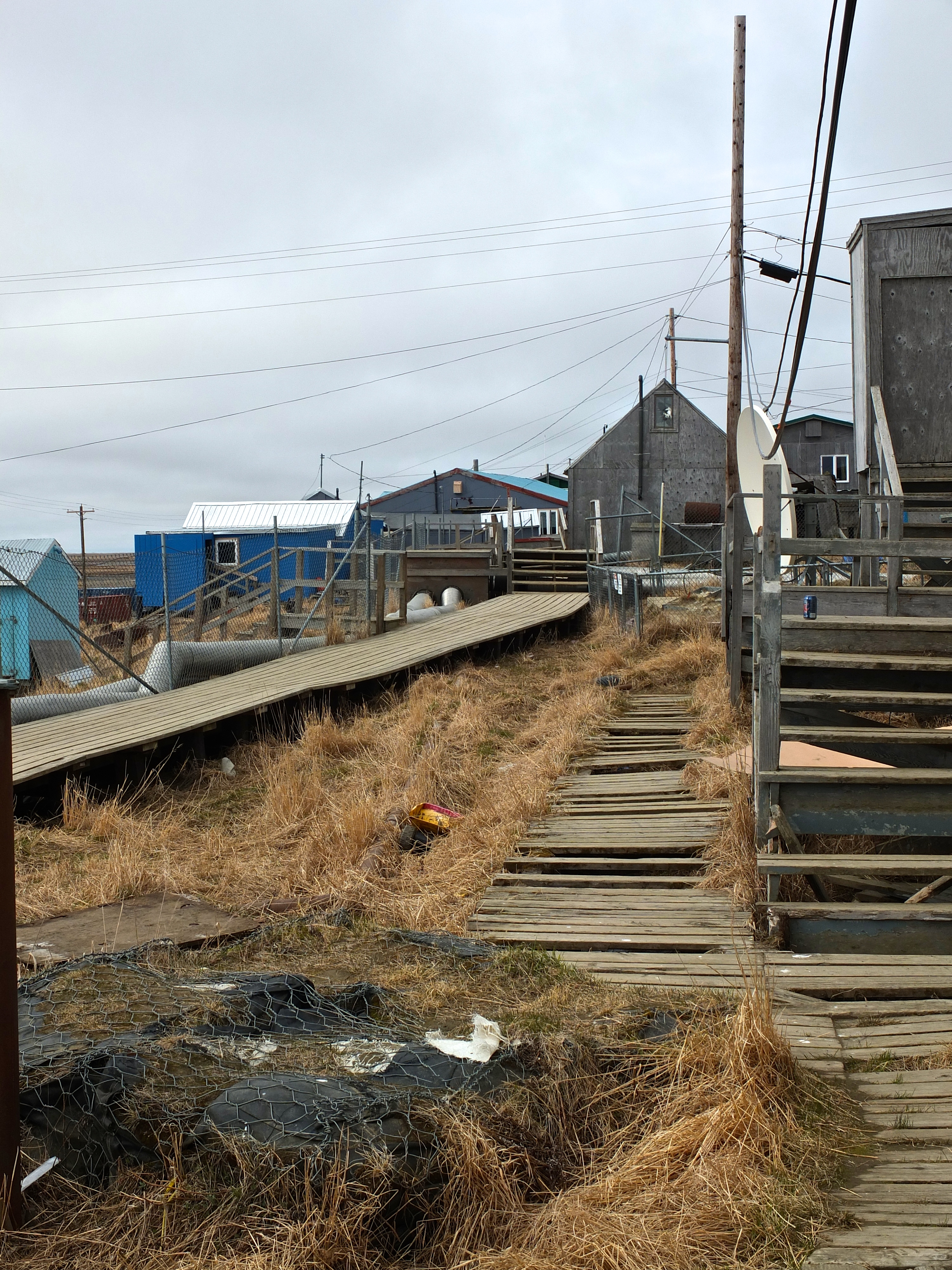
Boardwalk at Chevak, 2014

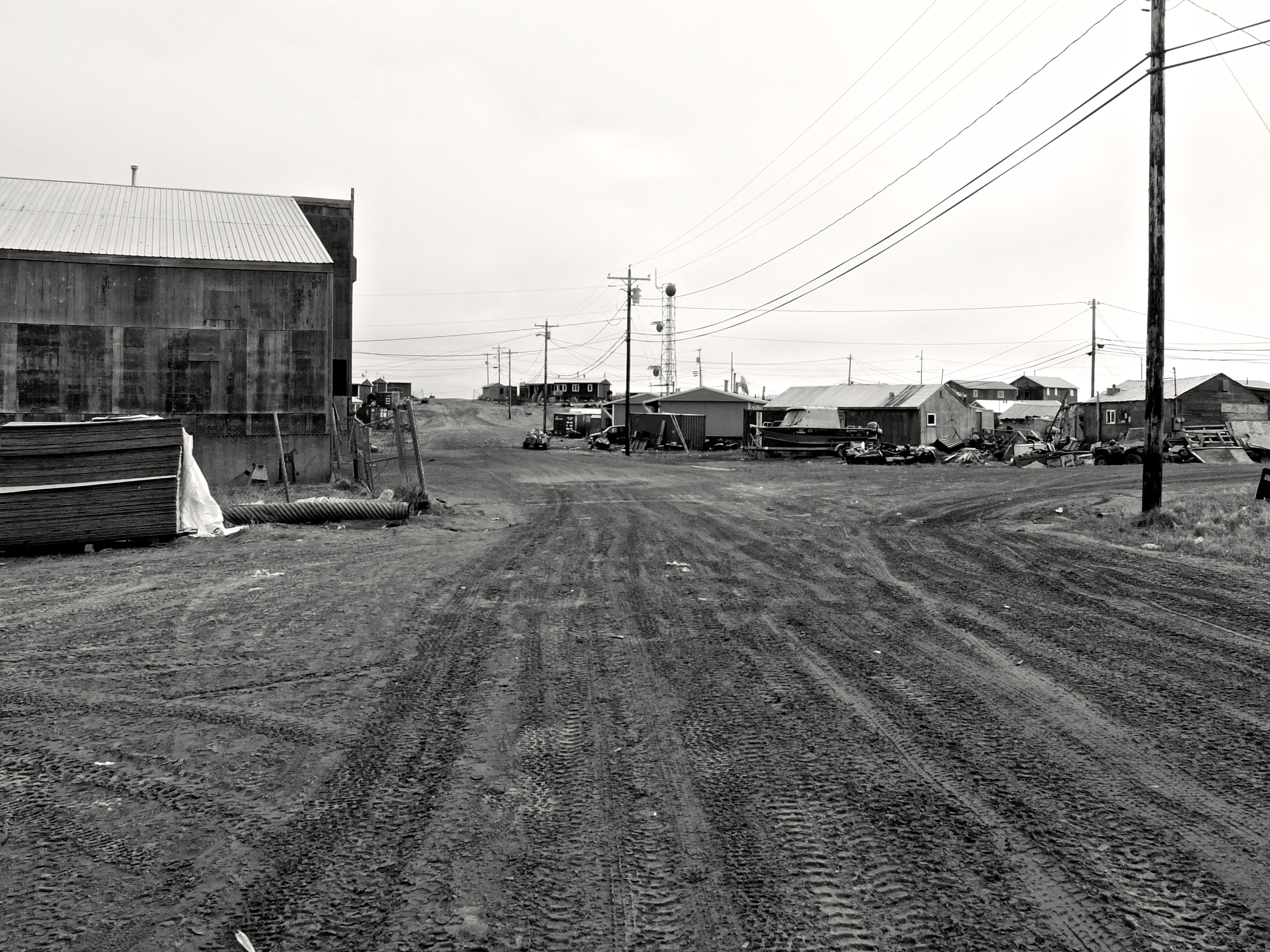
Spring in Chevak, 2014

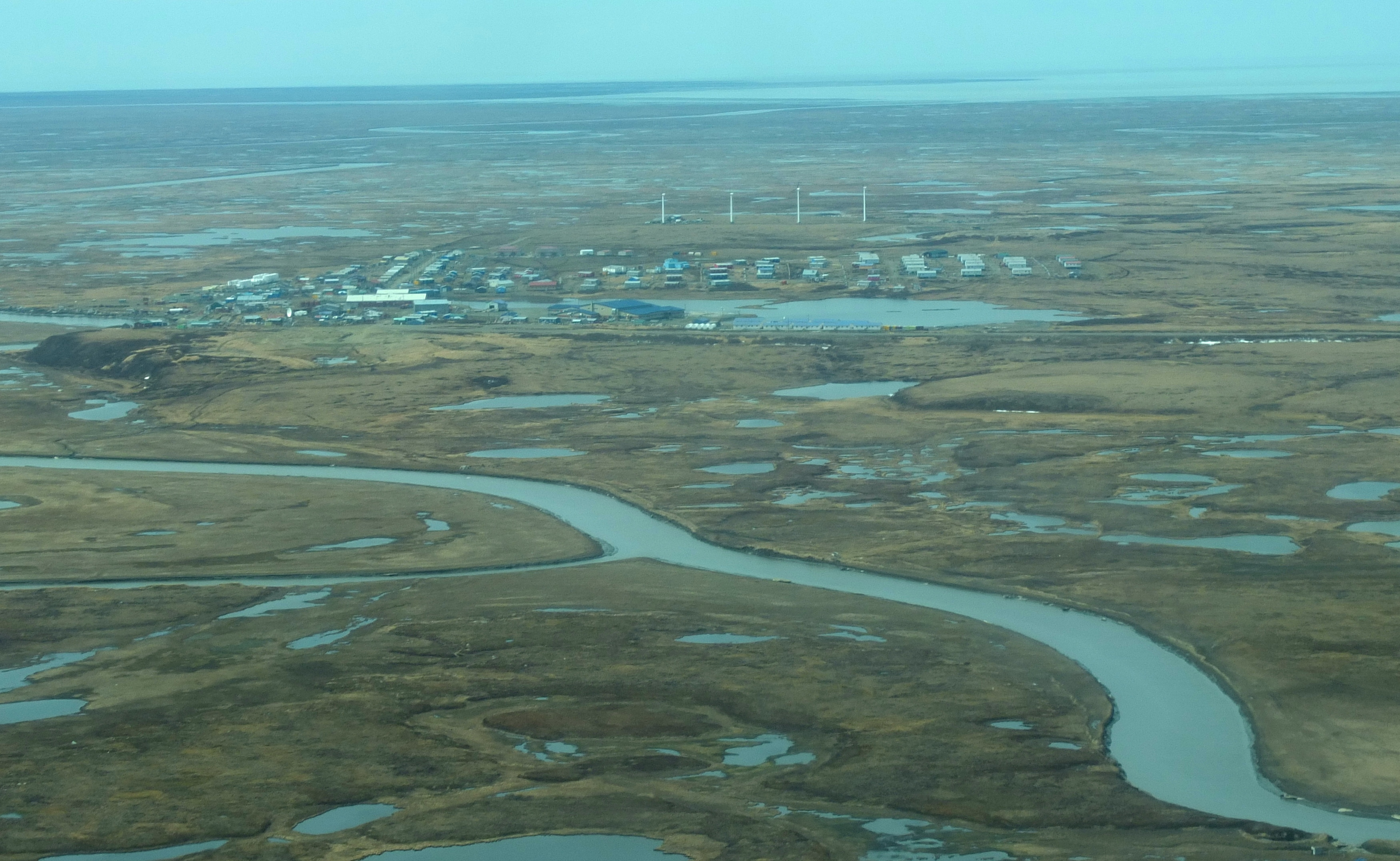
Aerial view of Chevak, 2014

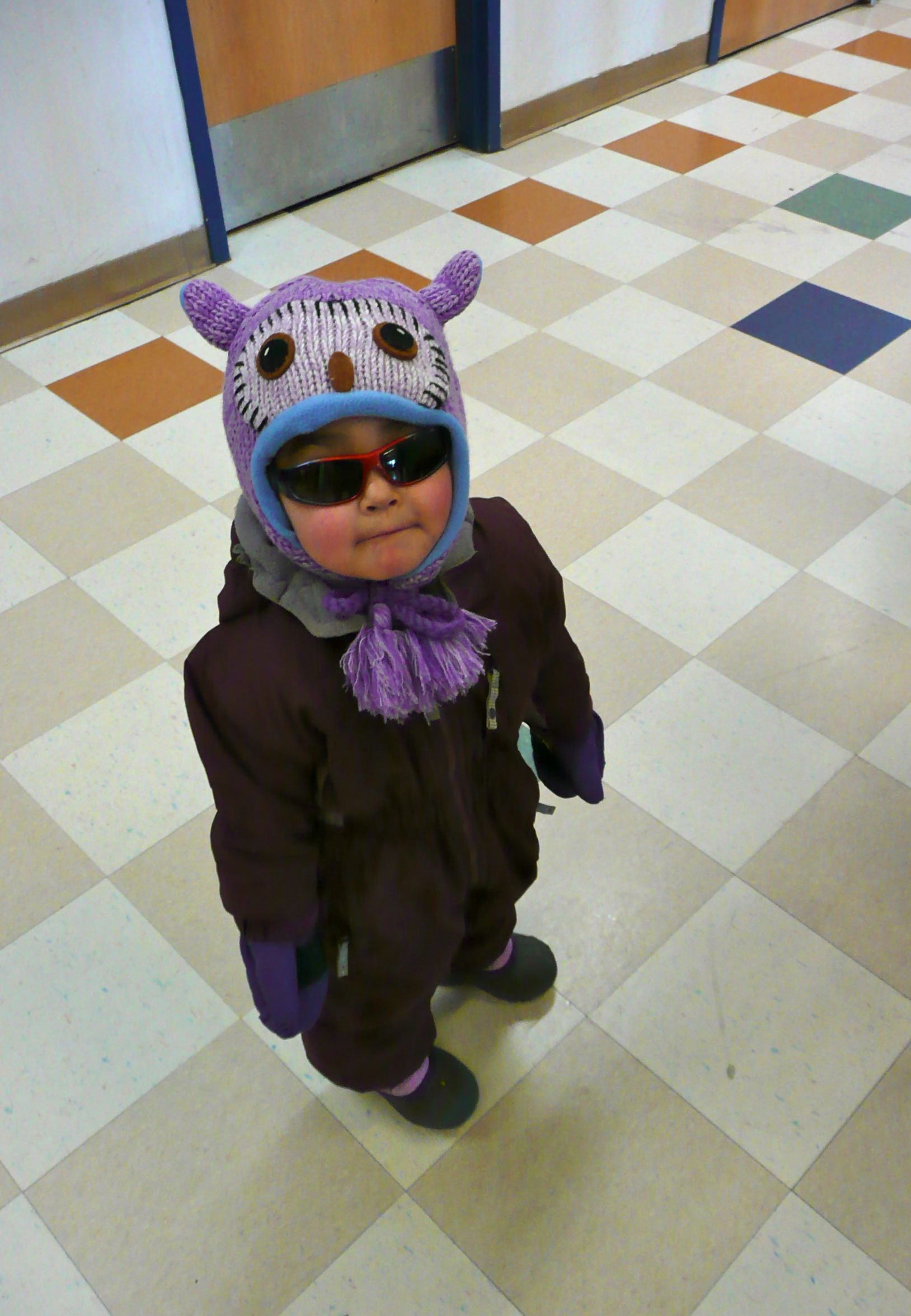
Little Chevak girl bundled up, 2012
