= Childbirth in Ghana =

Childbirth in Ghana is often seen as a joyous occasion in Ghanaian society, as children represent wealth, status, and the continuation of a lineage. Pregnant women are often given special privileges and are considered to be beautiful, fragile, and vulnerable to evil spirits. Therefore, women may seek guidance from a religious or spiritual diviner to protect their fetus or to increase their chances of conceiving. For example, the Akan may carry akuaba dolls, a fertility symbol, during pregnancy to ensure that they will give birth to a healthy and beautiful baby that resembles the doll's exaggerated features.

== Infertility ==
Due to the cultural implications and the importance of bearing children, infertility in Ghana can be devastating. Throughout the years, Ghanaians have believed that both physical and spiritual ailments are the cause of infertility. Some people believe that a womb could be too hot or too cold to support a developing baby. Others believe the cause of their infertility to be witchcraft, and this belief is often supported by traditional priests who assert that the woman can be rid of a witch's curse and be allowed to conceive if the priest performs a rite in which he asks fertility gods how they can be appeased.

Other spiritual beliefs involving infertility include the belief that infertility is the result of a woman's disobedience to God, in which the remedy is prayer and repentance. Women who consult a tradition birth attendant are likely to be told that prayer is the medicine for infertility, although they acknowledge that infertility is sometimes caused by a physical ailment. In these cases, the traditional birth attendant may blame the infertility on stomach aches and advise the woman to visit a hospital and take the medicine given by the doctor.

== Prenatal care ==
Cultural influences and sociodemographic characteristics play an important role in a woman's decision to seek maternal-child health services. These influences and characteristics include level of education, religious affiliation, region of residence, ethnicity, and occupation. In most communities, maternal-child health services coexist with traditional indigenous health care, and pregnant women in these rural areas may choose between modern medicine, herbalists, diviners, and spiritualists for care. The use of a doctor for prenatal care is low among women living in rural areas of Greater Accra and the Northern and Upper regions of Ghana. 23.1% of Protestant and Catholic women, and 10.3% of traditional women consult a doctor for prenatal care.

The majority of women believe that antenatal care from a health professional is necessary to determine that their pregnancy is normal, to see that the fetus is well-positioned, to learn about when they were expected to deliver, to obtain a tetanus immunization, for the diagnosis and treatment of illnesses during pregnancy, and nutritional advice. The barriers to seeking antenatal care include travel time and distance from health care facilities, the high cost, and the inconvenient hours of operations of the clinics. Some women also did not want people to know they were pregnant until their third month of pregnancy, and would wait until then to seek antenatal care. Inexpensive care from traditional birth attendants included routine antenatal care, however untrained attendants and traditional healers did not provide antenatal care.

== Pregnancy food beliefs and practices ==
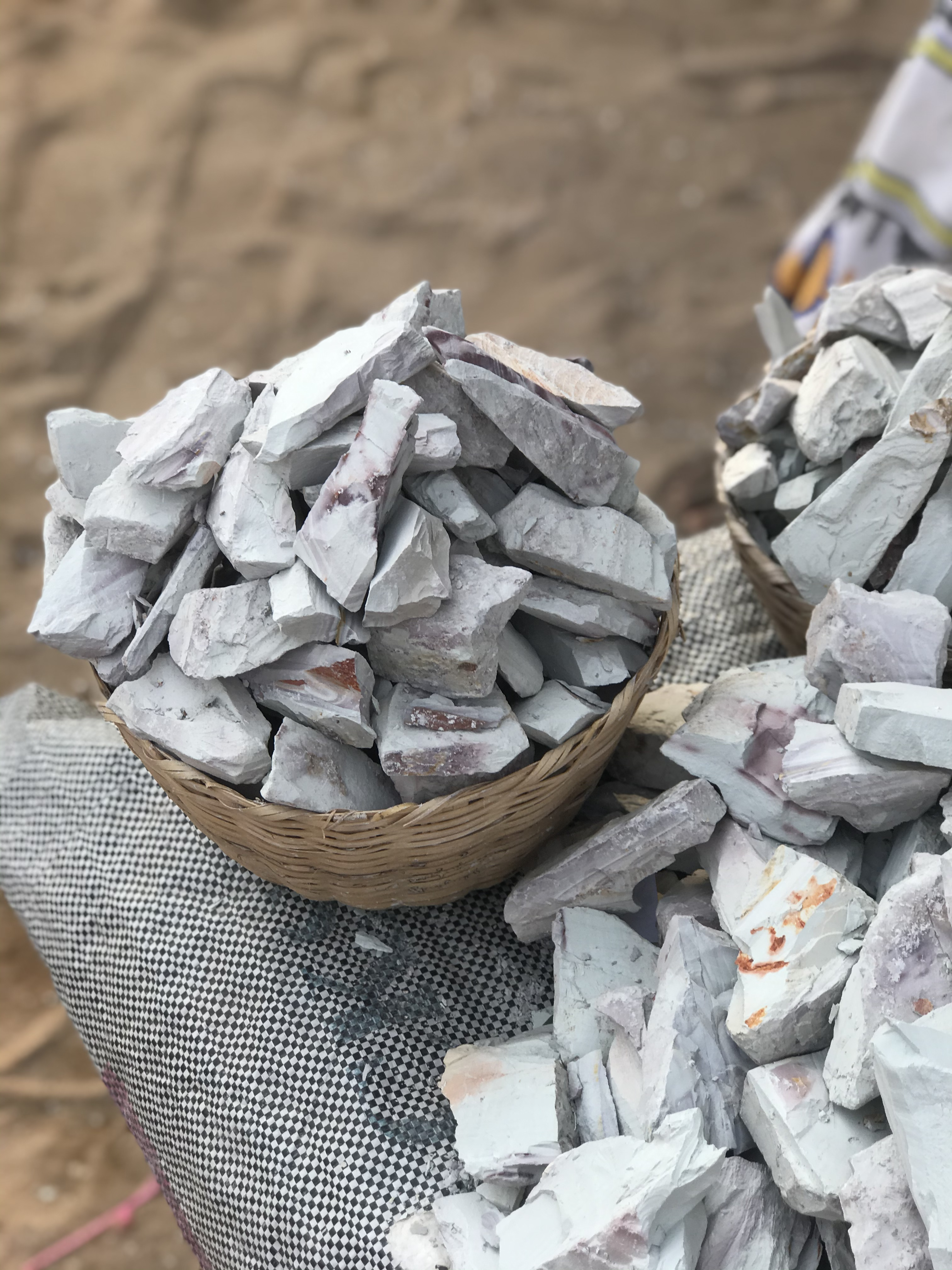
Baked clay ayilo eaten by pregnant women.

Knowledge about nutrition in Ghana is obtained through formal education, community health services, friends and families, cultural practices, traditions, and beliefs of the community. The majority of foods consumed by Ghanaian women during pregnancy were foods indigenous to Ghanaian diets in general such as green leafy vegetables, meats, fish, fruits, and legumes. They also consume foreign foods such as dairy products, biscuits, and beverages such as tea and powdered mixes.

Recommended raw foods during pregnancy include: bananas, oranges, papaya, pineapples, carrots, cabbage, lettuce, honey, and other vegetables. Recommended cooked foods include bean stew with palm oil and boiled white rice, bread, fried anchovies, smoked mackerel, snails in soup, stews with eggs and vegetables, palm nut soup with fufu and rice, and Nkontomire stew which is made with palm oil and boiled sweet cassava, or plantain, or yam. The beliefs about beneficial foods during pregnancy are based on their understanding of how certain foods can prevent anemia, enhance physical strength, support the development of the fetus, and minimize physiological disruption.

Women in Ghana also believe there are foods one must avoid during pregnancy. Most women agree that excess fat and sugar are harmful during pregnancy, and Fante and Akwapim women have beliefs about specific foods to avoid which include sugarcane, coconut, oranges, pineapple, chilli pepper, ground nut soup, eggs, high fat and high sugar foods, cooking oils, salt, and clay.

== Abortion and contraceptive use ==
In 1985, the abortion law passed in Ghana allowed for legal and safe abortion by a qualified medical practitioner for pregnancies that resulted from rape or incest, if the pregnancy threatens the life of the woman or her physical or mental health, or if there is substantial risk that the fetus would suffer from a serious physical anomaly or devastating disease. Many women in Ghana are not aware that abortion is legal in their country and tend to seek unsafe abortion providers and receive unsafe care afterwards. As a result, more than 11% of maternal deaths are due to unsafe abortions, making it the second most common death in women in Ghana.

According to the 2007 Ghana Maternal Health Survey (GMHS), 7% of all pregnancies end in abortion. The incidence of abortion is higher in women who are 20–24 years old, educated and wealthy women, and women who live in urban areas. Contraceptive use is low in Ghana with about 24% of women using contraceptives in 2008. 35% Of married women in Ghana are in need of contraceptives, but are not using any.

== Labor ==
=== Traditional beliefs about labor ===
People believed that women who were not faithful to their husbands would experience prolonged labor, and male traditional healers would remark that a promiscuous woman would have to tell every person in the room the number of men she has slept with apart from her husband before she would be able to give birth. Other traditional beliefs and practices related to laboring women included special herbs being used when the umbilical cord was wrapped around the neck of the fetus and for breech presentations, hot water poured on the abdomen and okra smeared on the vagina to expedite delivery, women who could not birth the placenta were given a bottle to blow into in order to force the placenta out, and a calabash of hot water was placed on the abdomen to stop postpartum hemorrhage and bleeding. Although many people have extensive knowledge of these traditional beliefs and practices, many indicate that most people no longer use them.

== Birth ==
Most deliveries in Ghana are attended by untrained personnel, including traditional birth attendants, and most traditional birth attendants in rural areas are illiterate elderly farmers.

Many women choose traditional birth attendants because of the lower cost, and because they live in the community and are able to assist quickly. They are known to assist with bathing the newborn, and giving advice on breastfeeding and newborn care. Traditional birth attendants deliver in cases on uncomplicated labor and are able to refer women to health care facilities when complications arise.

=== Place of delivery ===
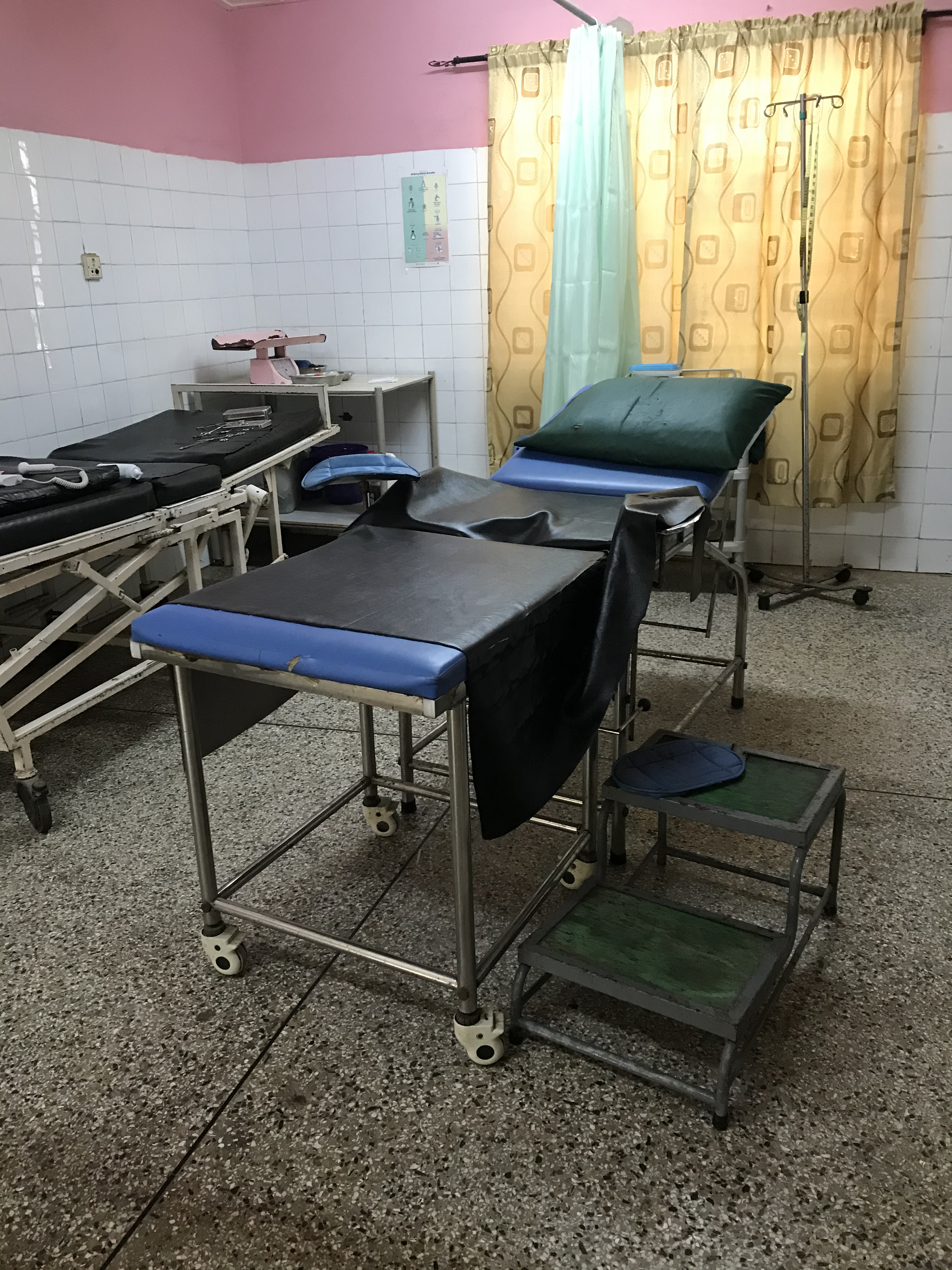
Labor ward in Ketu South Municipality.

The majority of Ghanaian women deliver at home with a traditional birth attendant and are referred to the hospital in cases of complicated labor. Although most deliveries are attended by a traditional birth attendant, most women prefer to deliver with a health professional. Barriers to obtaining professional health care include high costs, inadequate transportation, long distances to health care facilities, and poor road conditions. Some women were also too embarrassed to go to a hospital because they did not have nice clothes and preferred to deliver at home where no one could see that they were poor. Attempts on using telemedicine and portable ultrasound have been carried out, though they have not been converted into national policies.

=== Decision-making ===
In general, men have most of the decision-making power in Ghanaian society. In labor and delivery, husbands and heads of the households also make most of the decisions in collaboration with the birth attendant, and sometimes a soothsayer. During labor, the husband will usually make the decision about where to deliver because a woman in labor is considered unable to think clearly due to the pain, although the head of the household will have the final say. In some cases, women, especially those who can afford to go to a hospital, will make their own decision about where to give birth without waiting for the approval of their husband or household heads.

=== Placenta ===
Traditionally, the placenta has been buried outside of the house to show that the ancestors of the family has accepted the baby.

== Postpartum ==
The older women in the compound or community look after women in their postpartum period and assist with cleaning the baby and massage. Mothers receive postpartum teaching from the older women in the community. In the early postpartum period, there is great emphasis placed on the health and well-being of the mother and infant. Breastfeeding and postpartum abstinence is mandatory. Both mother and baby receive massages using shea-butter, palm kernel oil, and other oils. During this time, different colored and sized beads are tied around the wrist, waist, and ankles to monitor the growth of the infant. Older women will also keep a brass bowl full of herbs, mixtures, white clay, soft sponge, and charcoal. These items are believed to prevent health problems for the infant and mother.

== Care of the newborn ==
When babies are born, they are kept indoors for seven days because Ghanaians believe that this is the period in which they are most vulnerable to both physical and spiritual harm. During this period, it is believed that the child is wandering between the spiritual and physical world and may decide to go back to the spiritual world at any point. They are known as strangers until the end of the seven days when they are acknowledged and welcomed into society with an elaborate naming ceremony, or outdooring ceremony.

=== Outdooring ceremony ===
In Ghana, an Outdooring (Ga: kpodziemo; Akan: abadinto) is the traditional naming ceremony for infants. Traditionally this ceremony occurs eight days after the child is born where parents bring their newborn "outdoors" for the first time and give the child a day name. Cultural beliefs dictated that after eight days, the infant was likely to survive and could be provided a name.

In addition to the day name, Ghanaians frequently give children a name of an elder relative, either living or deceased. During the Outdooring, male infants would be circumcised and female infants would have their ears pierced Currently in Ghana, many of these practices including naming, circumcision, and ear piercing are done after birth within the hospital, and the Outdooring serves as a symbolic ceremony and celebration of birth.

=== Circumcision ===
In the past, boys in Ghanaian society often do not undergo circumcision as an infant. Boys will receive circumcision as they undergo initiation into adulthood at the age of ten to fourteen years of age. Ghanaians believe that the circumcision represents cleanliness and the pain will make the boys physically and mentally stronger. With the advent of modern medicine however, male children are circumcised from as early as four (4) days after they are born, and this is normally done at the hospitals or locally by Wanzams, special men trained in circumcision.

=== Spirit children ===
A "spirit child" in Ghana is a disabled child who is believed to possess magical powers to cause misfortune. Disability in Ghana is greatly stigmatized and the only way considered acceptable to deal with the problem is to kill them via advice by a witchdoctor. Spirit children are referred to as chichuru or kinkiriko in the Kassena-Nankana district in Northern Ghana. These children primarily come from poor, rural areas. However, if a spirit child is known to be "good" there are no punishments for the child or their family.

== See also ==
- Health in Ghana
- Women in Ghana
