= Doll =

Model, typically of a humanoid character

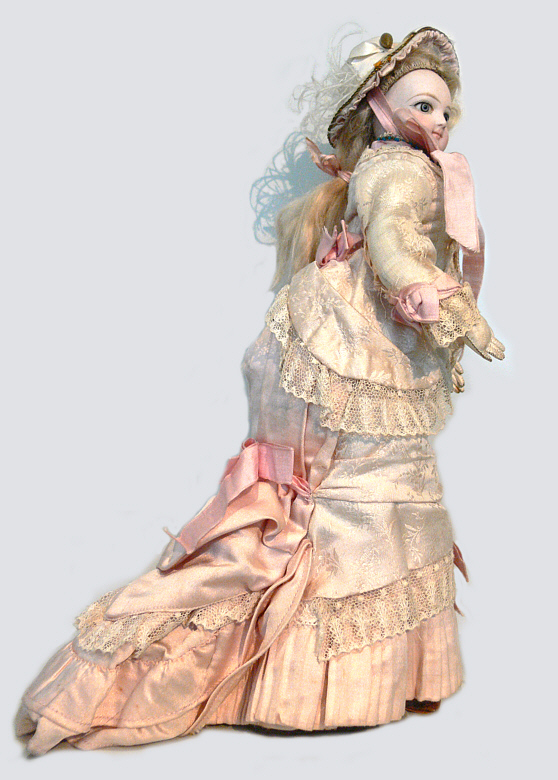
- European bisque doll from the 1870s
- Type: model figure
- Country: various
- Availability: Ancient times–present
- Materials: various

A doll is a model typically of a human or humanoid character, often used as a toy for children. Dolls have also been used in traditional religious rituals throughout the world. Traditional dolls made of materials such as clay and wood are found in the Americas, Asia, Africa and Europe. The earliest documented dolls go back to the ancient civilizations of Egypt, Greece, and Rome. They have been made as crude, rudimentary playthings as well as elaborate art. Modern doll manufacturing has its roots in Germany, from the 15th century. With industrialization and new materials such as porcelain and plastic, dolls were increasingly mass-produced. During the 20th century, dolls became increasingly popular as collectibles.

== History, types and materials ==
=== Early history and traditional dolls ===
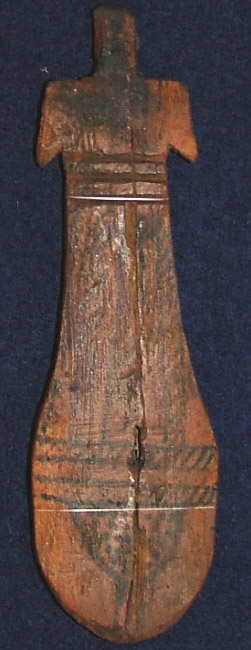
A typical Egyptian paddle doll from 2080 – 1990 BC

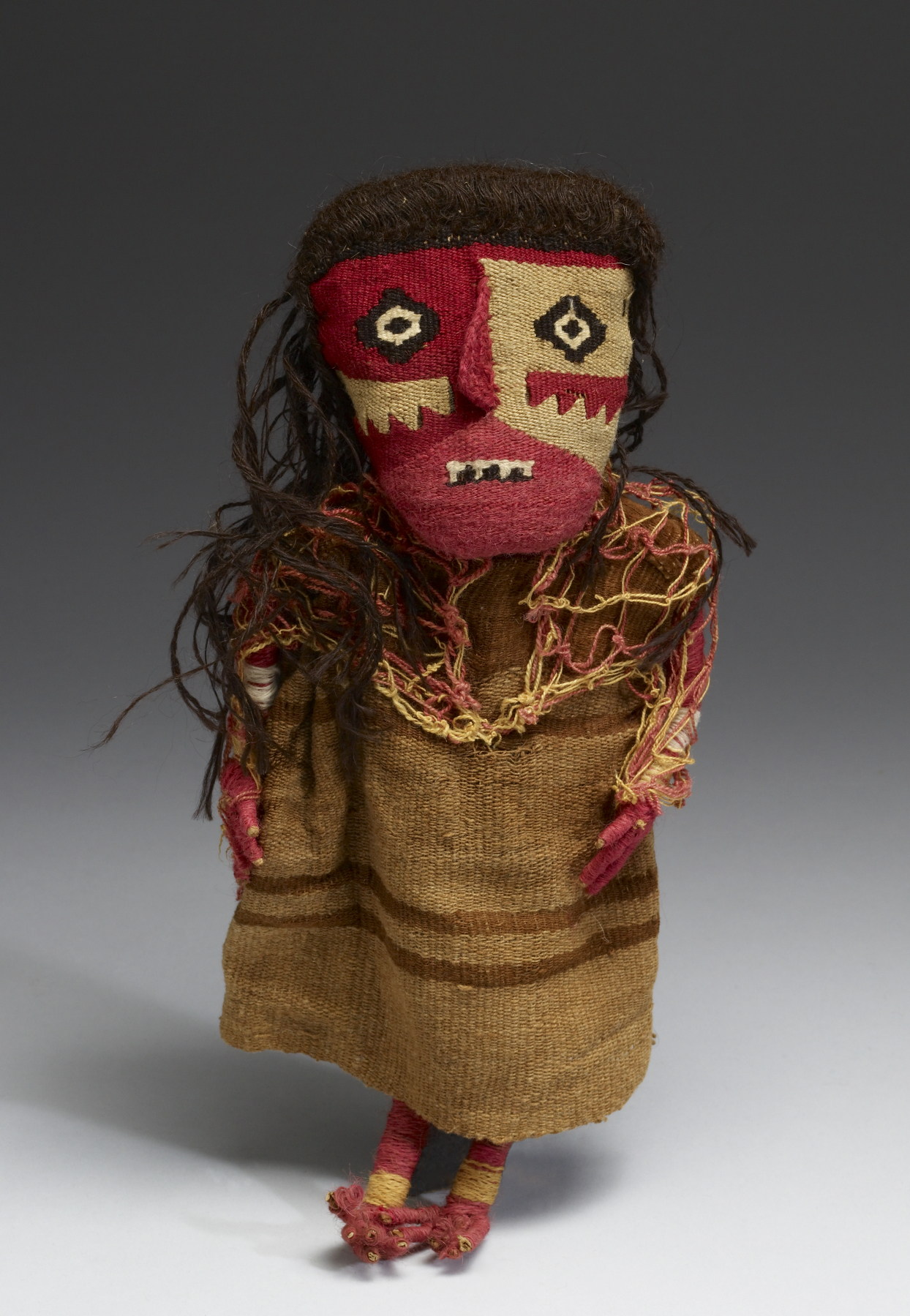
Textile doll (11th century), Chancay culture, found near Lima, Walters Art Museum. Of their small size, dolls are frequently found in ancient Peruvian tombs.

The earliest dolls were made from available materials such as clay, stone, wood, bone, ivory, leather, or wax. Archaeological evidence places dolls as the foremost candidate for the oldest known toy. Wooden paddle dolls have been found in Egyptian tombs dating to as early as the 21st century BC. Dolls with movable limbs and removable clothing date back to at least 200 BC. Archaeologists have discovered Greek dolls made of clay and articulated at the hips and shoulders. Rag dolls and stuffed animals were probably also popular, but no known examples of these have survived to the present day. Stories from ancient Greece around 100 AD show that dolls were used by little girls as playthings. Greeks called a doll κόρη, literally meaning "little girl", and a wax-doll was called δάγυνον, δαγύς and πλαγγών. Often dolls had movable limbs and were called νευρόσπαστα, they were worked by strings or wires. In ancient Rome, dolls were made of clay, wood or ivory. Dolls have been found in the graves of Roman children. Like children today, the younger members of Roman civilization would have dressed their dolls according to the latest fashions. In Greece and Rome, it was customary for boys to dedicate their toys to the gods when they reached puberty and for girls to dedicate their toys to the goddesses when they married. At marriage the Greek girls dedicated their dolls to Artemis and the Roman girls to Venus, but if they died before marriage their dolls were buried with them. Rag dolls are traditionally home-made from spare scraps of cloth material. Roman rag dolls have been found dating back to 300 BC.

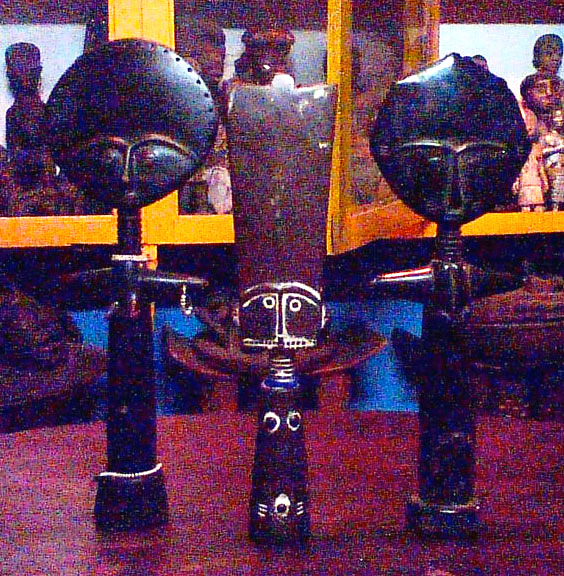
Traditional Ghanaian akuaba dolls

Traditional dolls are sometimes used as children's playthings, but they may also have spiritual, magical and ritual value. There is no defined line between spiritual dolls and toys. In some cultures dolls that had been used in rituals were given to children. They were also used in children's education and as carriers of cultural heritage. In other cultures dolls were considered too laden with magical powers to allow children to play with them.

African dolls are used to teach and entertain; they are supernatural intermediaries, and they are manipulated for ritual purposes. Their shape and costume vary according to region and custom. Dolls are frequently handed down from mother to daughter. Akuaba are wooden ritual fertility dolls from Ghana and nearby areas. The best known akuaba are those of the Ashanti people, whose akuaba have large, disc-like heads. Other tribes in the region have their own distinctive style of akuaba.

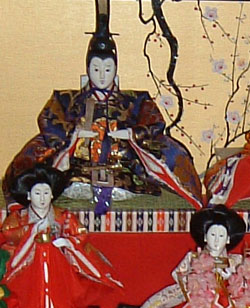
Japanese hina dolls, displayed during the Hinamatsuri festival

There is a rich history of Japanese dolls dating back to the Dogū figures (8000–200 BCE). and Haniwa funerary figures (300–600 AD). By the eleventh century, dolls were used as playthings as well as for protection and in religious ceremonies. During Hinamatsuri, the doll festival, hina dolls (雛人形, hina-ningyō) are displayed. These are made of straw and wood, painted, and dressed in elaborate, many-layered textiles. Daruma dolls are spherical dolls with red bodies and white faces without pupils. They represent Bodhidharma, the East Indian who founded Zen, and are used as good luck charms. Wooden Kokeshi dolls have no arms or legs, but a large head and cylindrical body, representing little girls.

The use of an effigy to perform a spell on someone is documented in African, Native American, and European cultures. Examples of such magical devices include the European poppet and the nkisi or bocio of West and Central Africa. In European folk magic and witchcraft, poppet dolls are used to represent a person for casting spells on that person. The intention is that whatever actions are performed upon the effigy will be transferred to the subject through sympathetic magic. The practice of sticking pins in voodoo dolls have been associated with African-American Hoodoo folk magic. Voodoo dolls are not a feature of Haitian Vodou religion, but have been portrayed as such in popular culture, and stereotypical voodoo dolls are sold to tourists in Haiti. Likely the voodoo doll concept in popular culture is influenced by the European poppet. A kitchen witch is a poppet originating in Northern Europe. It resembles a stereotypical witch or crone and is displayed in residential kitchens as a means to provide good luck and ward off bad spirits.

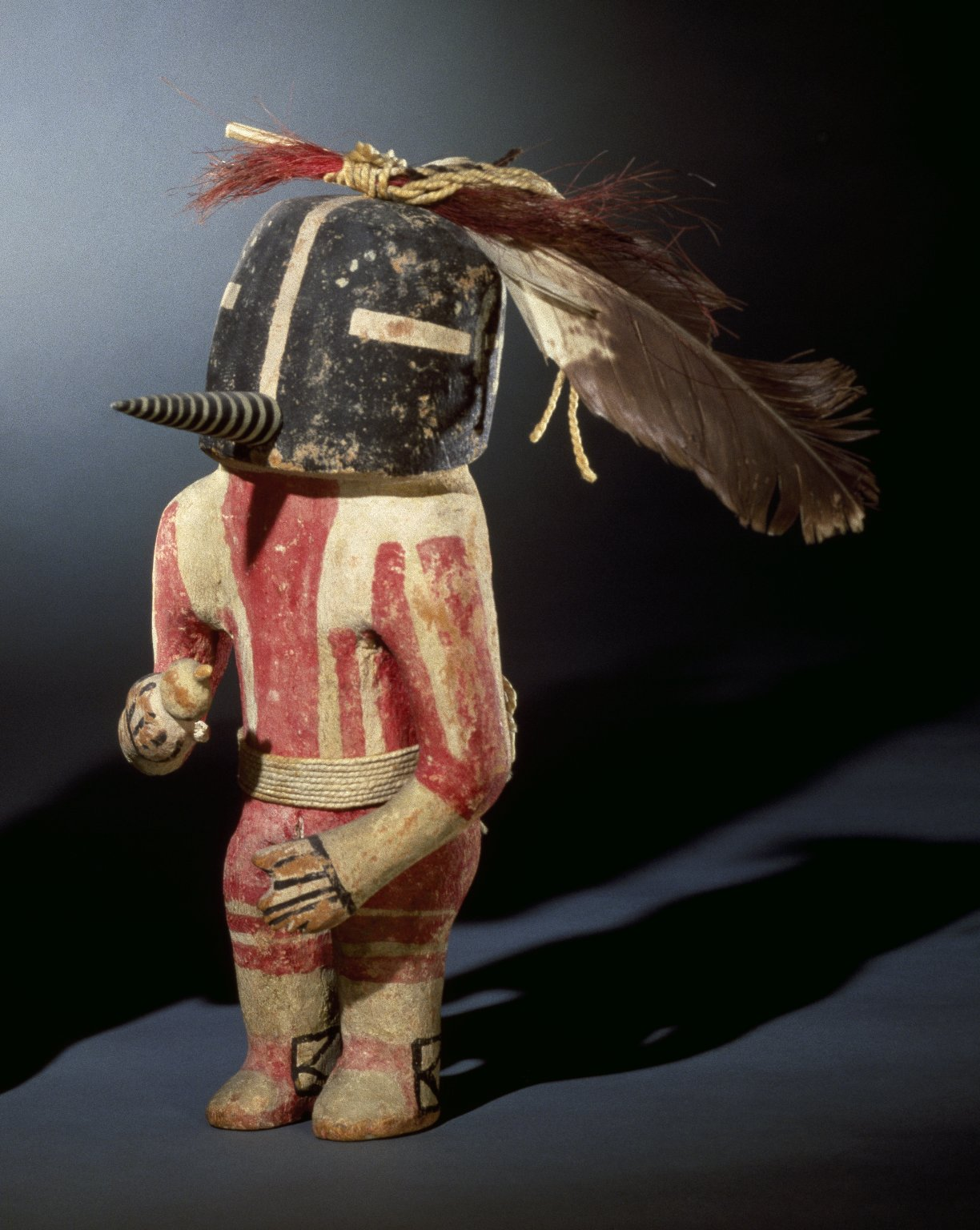
A traditional Native American Hopi Kachina doll, probably late 19th century

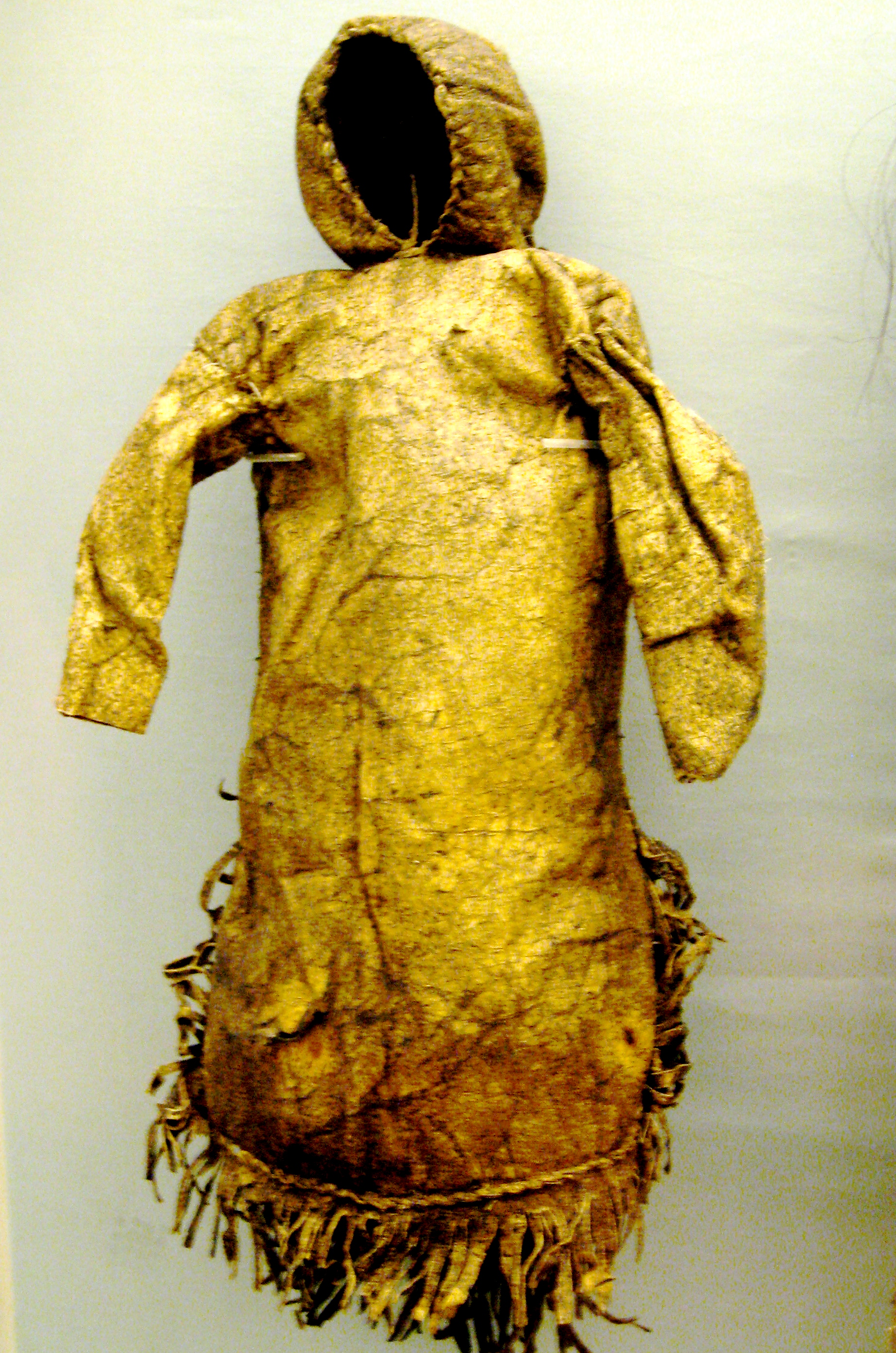
A Greenlandic Inuit doll

Hopi Kachina dolls are effigies made of cottonwood that embody the characteristics of the ceremonial Kachina, the masked spirits of the Hopi Native American tribe. Kachina dolls are objects meant to be treasured and studied in order to learn the characteristics of each Kachina. Inuit dolls are made out of soapstone and bone, materials common to the Inuit. Many are clothed with animal fur or skin. Their clothing articulates the traditional style of dress necessary to survive cold winters, wind, and snow. The tea dolls of the Innu people were filled with tea for young girls to carry on long journeys. Apple dolls are traditional North American dolls with a head made from dried apples. In Inca mythology, Sara Mama was the goddess of grain. She was associated with maize that grew in multiples or was similarly strange. These strange plants were sometimes dressed as dolls of Sara Mama. Corn husk dolls are traditional Native American dolls made out of the dried leaves or husk of a corncob. Traditionally, they do not have a face. The making of corn husk dolls was adopted by early European settlers in the United States. Early settlers also made rag dolls and carved wooden dolls, called Pennywoods. La última muñeca, or "the last doll", is a tradition of the Quinceañera, the celebration of a girl's fifteenth birthday in parts of Latin America. During this ritual the quinceañera relinquishes a doll from her childhood to signify that she is no longer in need of such a toy. In the United States, dollmaking became an industry in the 1860s, after the Civil War.

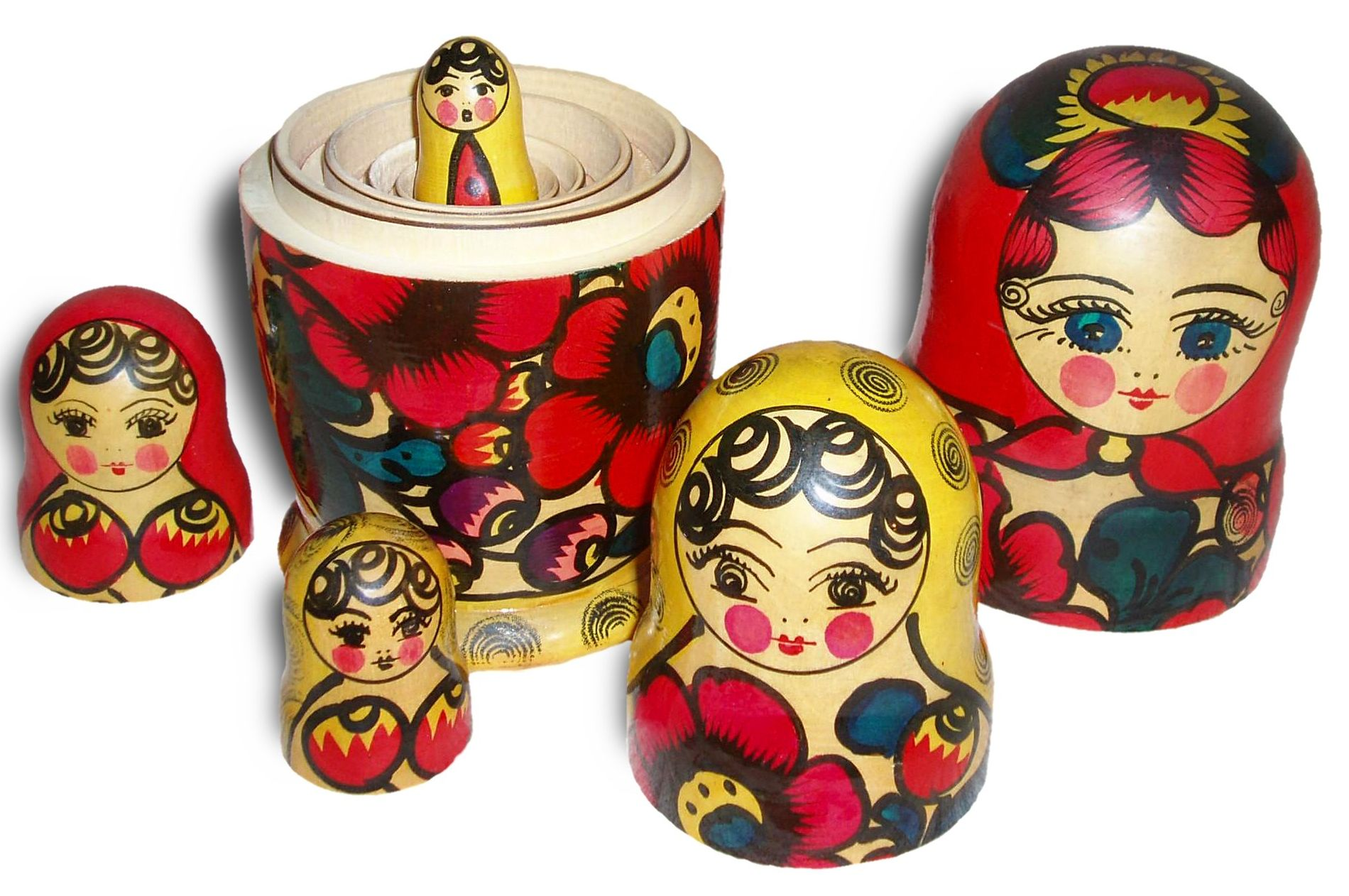
A set of Russian Matryoshka dolls taken apart

Matryoshka dolls are traditional Russian dolls, consisting of a set of hollow wooden figures that open up and nest inside each other. They typically portray traditional peasants and the first set was carved and painted in 1890. In Germany, clay dolls have been documented as far back as the 13th century, and wooden doll making from the 15th century. Beginning about the 15th century, increasingly elaborate dolls were made for Nativity scene displays, chiefly in Italy. Dolls with detailed, fashionable clothes were sold in France in the 16th century, though their bodies were often crudely constructed. The German and Dutch peg wooden dolls were cheap and simply made and were popular toys for poorer children in Europe from the 16th century. Wood continued to be the dominant material for dolls in Europe until the 19th century. Through the 18th and 19th centuries, wood was increasingly combined with other materials, such as leather, wax and porcelain and the bodies made more articulate. It is unknown when dolls' glass eyes first appeared, but brown was the dominant eye color for dolls up until the Victorian era when blue eyes became more popular, inspired by Queen Victoria.

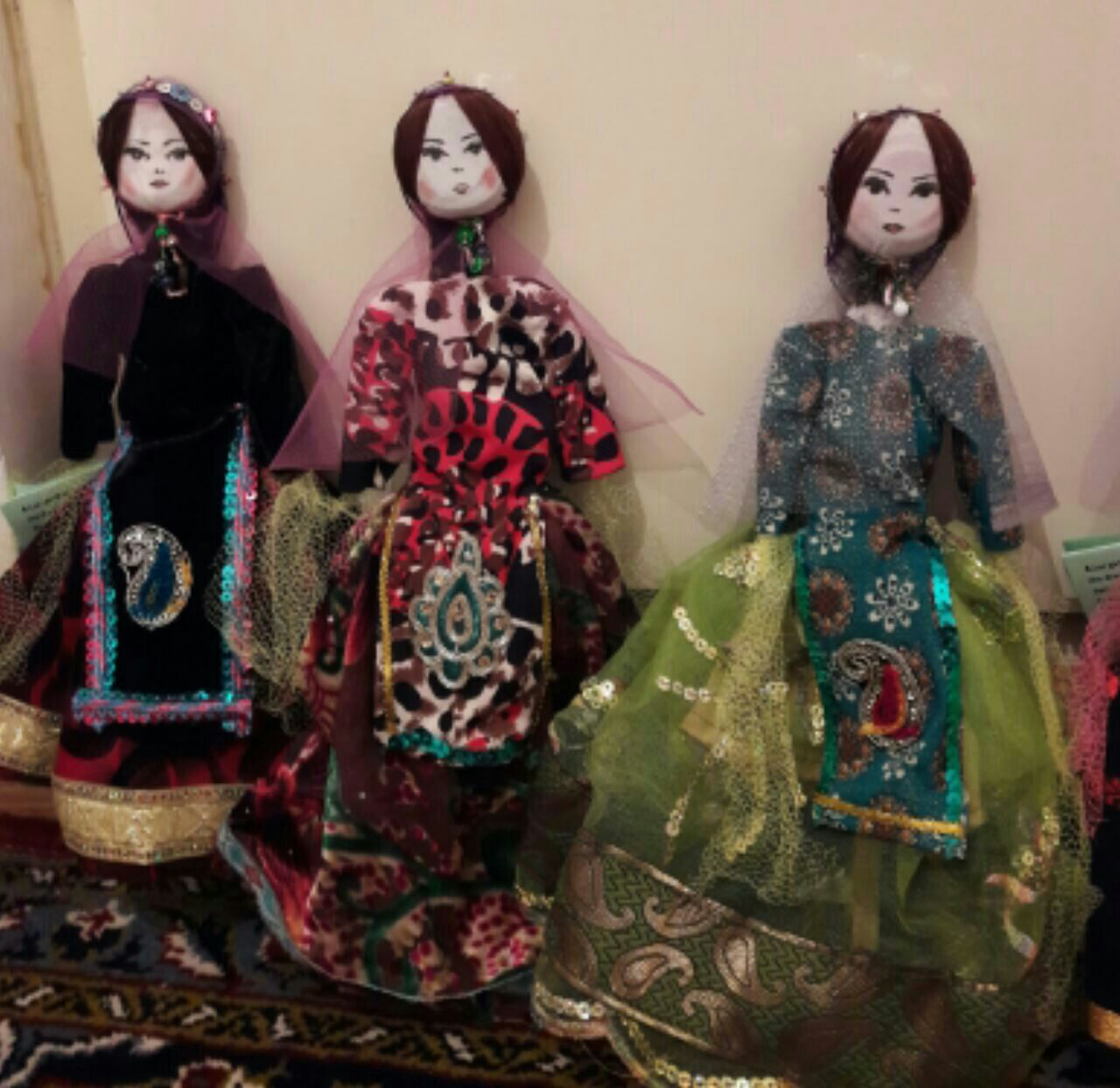
Layli dolls from Mamasani, Iran

Dolls, puppets and masks allow ordinary people to state what is impossible in the real situation; In Iran for example during Qajar era, people criticised the politics and social conditions of Ahmad-Shah's reign via puppetry without any fear of punishment. According to the Islamic rules, the act of dancing in public especially for women, is a taboo. But dolls or puppets have free and independent identities and are able to do what is not feasible for the real person. Layli is a hinged dancing doll, which is popular among the Lur people of Iran. The name Layli is originated from the Middle East folklore and love story, Layla and Majnun. Layli is the symbol of the beloved who is spiritually beautiful. Layli also represents and maintains a cultural tradition, which is gradually vanishing in urban life.

=== Industrial era ===
During the 19th century, dolls' heads were often made of porcelain and combined with a body of leather, cloth, wood, or composite materials, such as papier-mâché or composition, a mix of pulp, sawdust, glue and similar materials. With the advent of polymer and plastic materials in the 20th century, doll making largely shifted to these materials. The low cost, ease of manufacture, and durability of plastic materials meant new types of dolls could be mass-produced at a lower price. The earliest materials were rubber and celluloid. From the mid-20th century, soft vinyl became the dominant material, in particular for children's dolls. Beginning in the 20th century, both porcelain and plastic dolls are made directly for the adult collectors market. Synthetic resins such as polyurethane resemble porcelain in texture and are used for collectible dolls.

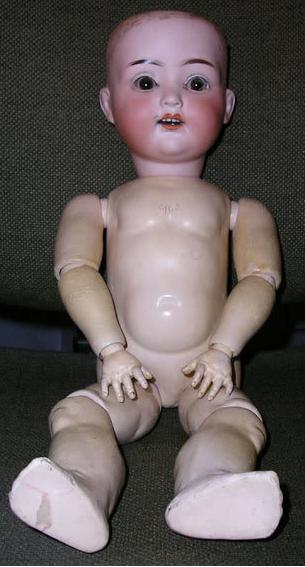
Bisque-head German doll with glass eyes and ball-jointed composition body, c. 1920

Colloquially the terms porcelain doll, bisque doll and china doll are sometimes used interchangeably. But collectors make a distinction between china dolls, made of glazed porcelain, and bisque dolls, made of unglazed bisque or biscuit porcelain. A typical antique china doll has a white glazed porcelain head with painted molded hair and a body made of cloth or leather. The name comes from china being used to refer to the material porcelain. They were mass-produced in Germany, peaking in popularity between 1840 and 1890 and selling in the millions. Parian dolls were also made in Germany, from around 1860 to 1880. They are made of white porcelain similar to china dolls but the head is not dipped in glaze and has a matte finish. Bisque dolls are characterized by their realistic, skin-like matte finish. They had their peak of popularity between 1860 and 1900 with French and German dolls. Antique German and French bisque dolls from the 19th century were often made as children's playthings, but contemporary bisque dolls are predominantly made directly for the collectors market. Realistic, lifelike wax dolls were popular in Victorian England.

Up through the middle of the 19th century, European dolls were predominantly made to represent grown-ups. Childlike dolls and the later ubiquitous baby doll did not appear until around 1850. But, by the late 19th century, baby and childlike dolls had overtaken the market. By about 1920, baby dolls typically were made of composition with a cloth body. The hair, eyes, and mouth were painted. A voice box was sewn into the body that cried ma-ma when the doll was tilted, giving them the name Mama dolls. During 1923, 80% of all dolls sold to children in the United States were Mama dolls.

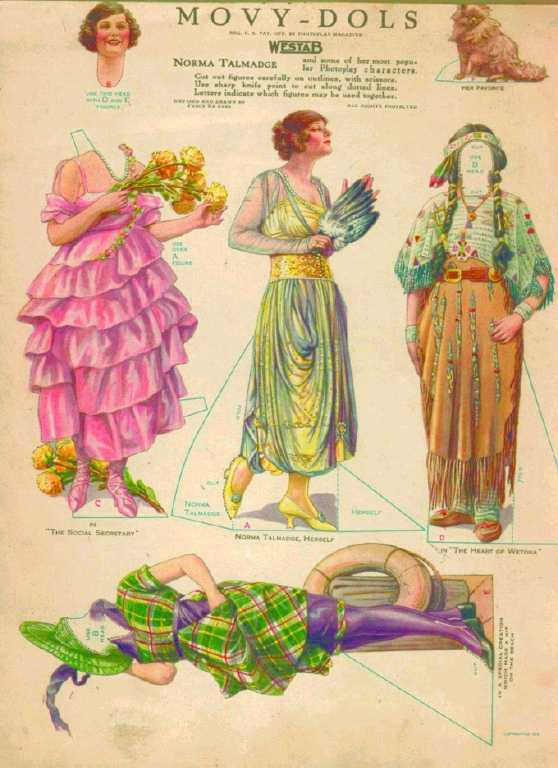
Paper doll portraying actress Norma Talmadge and some of her film costumes, 1919

Paper dolls are cut out of paper, with separate clothes that are usually held onto the dolls by folding tabs. They often reflect contemporary styles, and 19th century ballerina paper dolls were among the earliest celebrity dolls. The 1930s Shirley Temple doll sold millions and was one of the most successful celebrity dolls. Small celluloid Kewpie dolls, based on illustrations by Rose O'Neill, were popular in the early 20th century. Madame Alexander created the first collectible doll based on a licensed character – Scarlett O'Hara from Gone with the Wind.

Contemporary dollhouses have their roots in European baby house display cases from the 17th century. Early dollhouses were all handmade, but, following the Industrial Revolution and World War II, they were increasingly mass-produced and became more affordable. Children's dollhouses during the 20th century have been made of tin litho, plastic, and wood. Contemporary houses for adult collectors are typically made of wood.

The earliest modern stuffed toys were made in 1880. They differ from earlier rag dolls in that they are made of plush fur-like fabric and commonly portray animals rather than humans. Teddy bears first appeared in 1902–1903.

Black dolls have been designed to resemble dark-skinned persons varying from stereotypical to more accurate portrayals. Rag dolls made by American slaves served as playthings for slave children. Golliwogg was a children's book rag doll character in the late 19th century that was widely reproduced as a toy. The doll has very black skin, eyes rimmed in white, clown lips, and frizzy hair, and has been described as an anti-black caricature. Early mass-produced black dolls were typically dark versions of their white counterparts. The earliest American black dolls with realistic African facial features were made in the 1960s.

The first Barbie fashion doll from 1959

Fashion dolls are primarily designed to be dressed to reflect fashion trends and are usually modeled after teen girls or adult women. The earliest fashion dolls were French bisque dolls from the mid-19th century. Contemporary fashion dolls are typically made of vinyl. Barbie, from the American toy company Mattel, dominated the market from her inception in 1959. Bratz was the first doll to challenge Barbie's dominance, reaching forty percent of the market in 2006.

Plastic action figures, often representing superheroes, are primarily marketed to boys. Fashion dolls and action figures are often part of a media franchise that may include films, TV, video games and other related merchandise. Bobblehead dolls are collectible plastic dolls with heads connected to the body by a spring or hook in such a way that the head bobbles. They often portray baseball players or other athletes.

=== Modern era ===
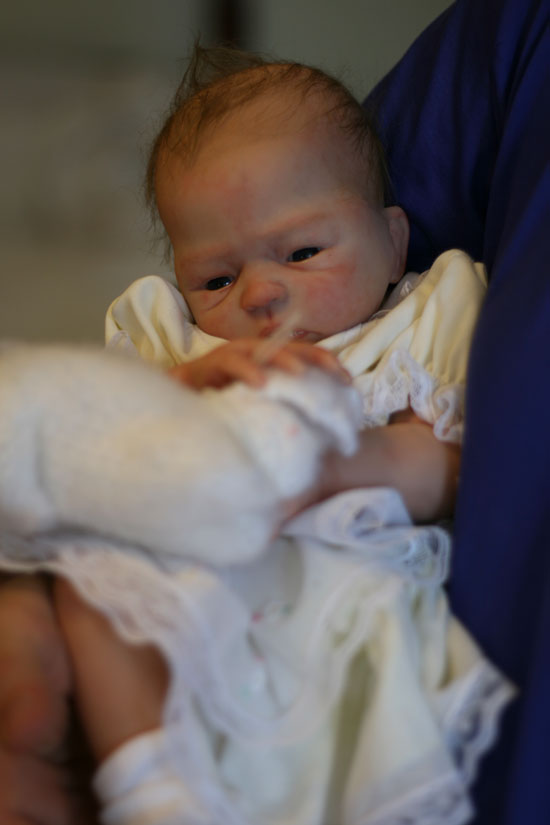
A reborn doll, customized to realistically portray a human baby

With the introduction of computers and the Internet, virtual and online dolls appeared. These are often similar to traditional paper dolls and enable users to design virtual dolls and drag and drop clothes onto dolls or images of actual people to play dress up. These include KiSS, Stardoll and Dollz.

Also with the advent of the Internet, collectible dolls are customized and sold or displayed online. Reborn dolls are vinyl dolls that have been customized to resemble a human baby with as much realism as possible. They are often sold online through sites such as eBay. Asian ball-jointed dolls (BJDs) are cast in polyurethane synthetic resin in a style that has been described as both realistic and influenced by anime. Asian BJDs and Asian fashion dolls such as Pullip and Blythe are often customized and photographed. The photos are shared in online communities.

== Uses, appearances and issues ==
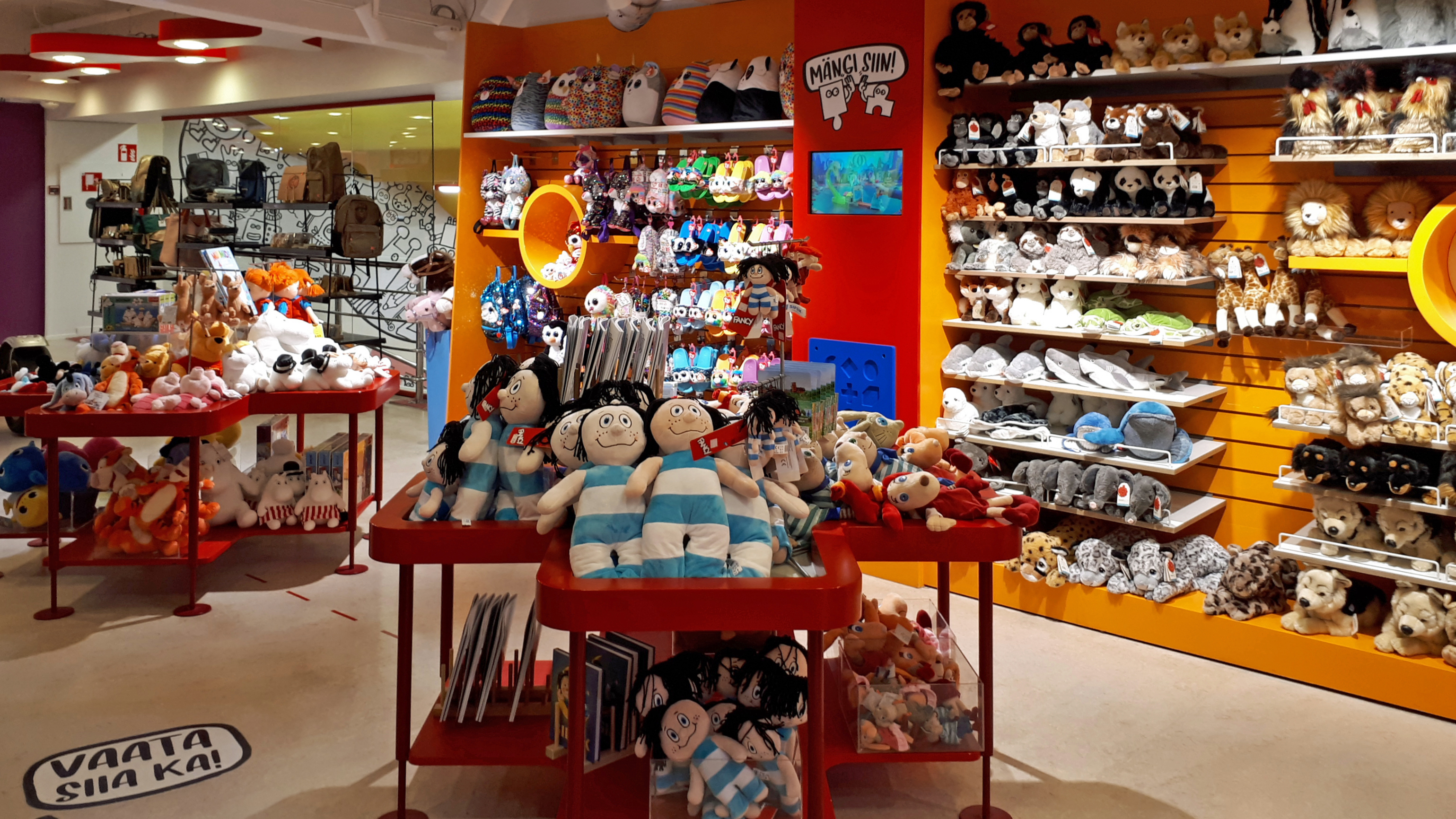
Dolls at a toy store in Tallinn, Estonia

Since ancient times, dolls have played a central role in magic and religious rituals and have been used as representations of deities. Dolls have also traditionally been toys for children. Dolls are also collected by adults, for their nostalgic value, beauty, historical importance or financial value. Antique dolls originally made as children's playthings have become collector's items. Nineteenth-century bisque dolls made by French manufacturers such as Bru and Jumeau may be worth almost $22,000 today.

Dolls have traditionally been made as crude, rudimentary playthings as well as with elaborate, artful design. They have been created as folk art in cultures around the globe, and, in the 20th century, art dolls began to be seen as high art. Artist Hans Bellmer made surrealistic dolls that had interchangeable limbs in 1930s and 1940s Germany as opposition to the Nazi party's idolization of a perfect Aryan body. East Village artist Greer Lankton became famous in the 1980s for her theatrical window displays of drug addicted, anorexic and mutant dolls.

Lifelike or anatomically correct dolls are used by health professionals, medical schools and social workers to train doctors and nurses in various health procedures or investigate cases of all sexual abuse of children. Artists sometimes use jointed wooden mannequins in drawing the human figure. Many ordinary doll brands are also anatomically correct, although most types of dolls are degenitalized. The degenitalization of dolls is less likely to occur among doll manufacturers from jurisdictons with less social emphasis on rigid Abrahamic religious traditions, and where there's a religiously neutral or evenly pluralistic public holiday schedule, and where there is public visibility of religious minorities, such as neopagan religion practitioners.

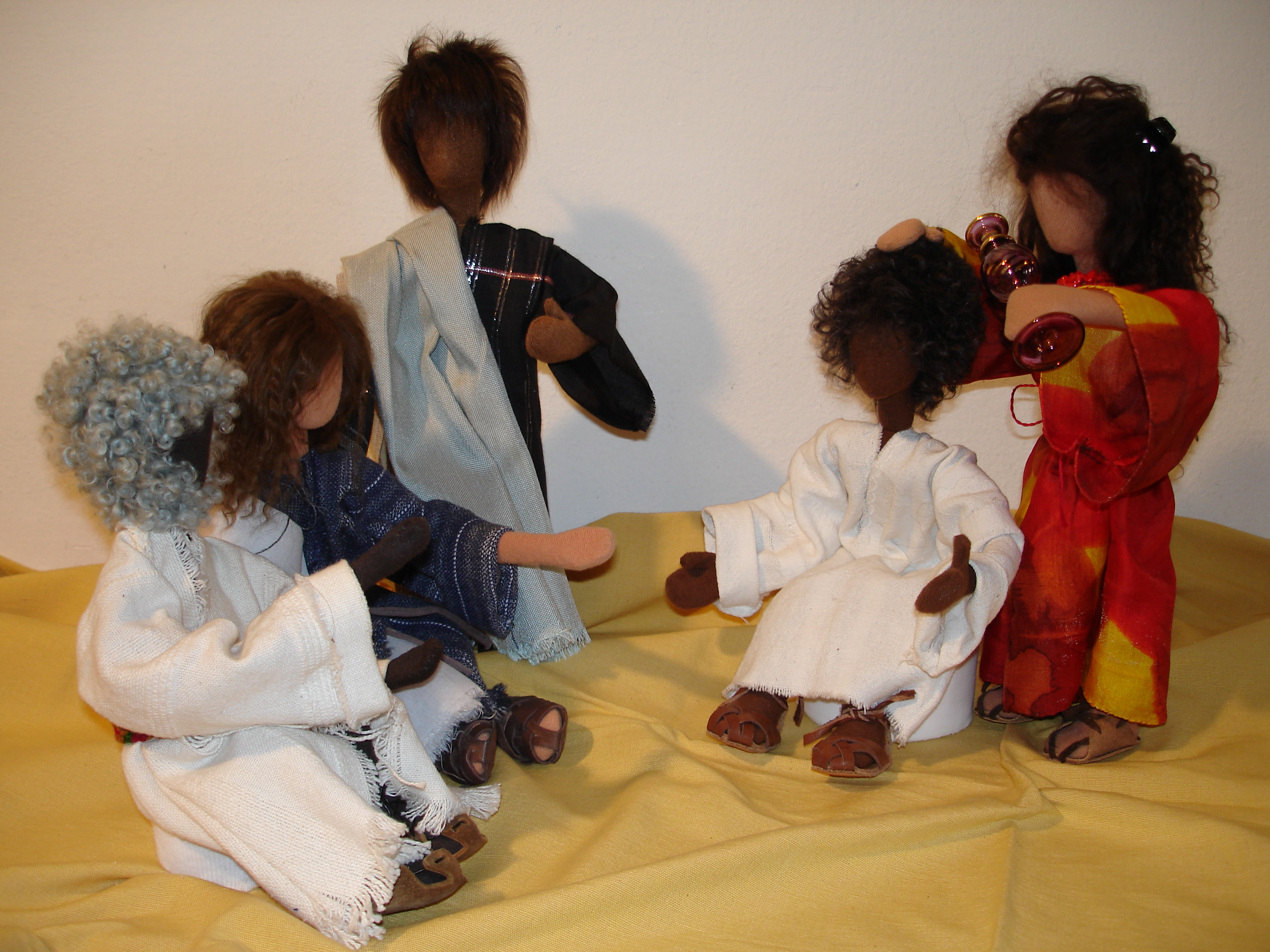
Swiss Egli-Figuren displaying a Bible story

Egli-Figuren are a type of doll that originated in Switzerland in 1964 for telling Bible stories.

In Western society, a gender difference in the selection of toys has been observed and studied. Action figures that represent traditional masculine traits are popular with boys, who are more likely to choose toys that have some link to tools, transportation, garages, machines and military equipment. Dolls for girls tend to represent feminine traits and come with such accessories as clothing, kitchen appliances, utensils, furniture and jewelry.

Pediophobia is a fear of dolls or similar objects. Psychologist Ernst Jentsch theorized that uncanny feelings arise when there is an intellectual uncertainty about whether an object is alive or not. Sigmund Freud further developed on these theories. Japanese roboticist Masahiro Mori expanded on these theories to develop the uncanny valley hypothesis: if an object is obviously enough non-human, its human characteristics will stand out and be endearing; however, if that object reaches a certain threshold of human-like appearance, its non-human characteristics will stand out, and be disturbing.

=== Doll hospitals ===
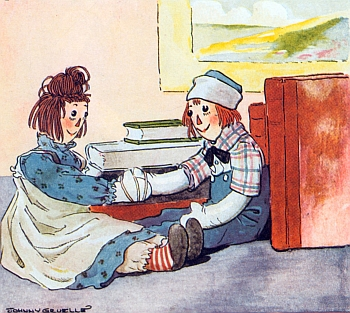
Rag doll characters Raggedy Ann and Raggedy Andy, illustrated by Johnny Gruelle, 1920

A doll hospital is a workshop that specializes in the restoration or repair of dolls. Doll hospitals can be found in countries around the world. One of the oldest doll hospitals was established in Lisbon, Portugal in 1830, and another in Melbourne, reputedly the first such establishment in Australia, was founded in 1888. There is a Doll Doctors Association in the United States. Henri Launay, who has been repairing dolls at his shop in northeast Paris for 43 years, says he has restored over 30,000 dolls in the course of his career. Most of the clients are not children, but adults in their 50s and 60s. Some doll brands, such as American Girl and Madame Alexander, also offer doll hospital services for their own dolls.

=== Dolls and children's tales ===
Many books deal with dolls tales, including Wilhelmina. The Adventures of a Dutch Doll, by Nora Pitt-Taylor, pictured by Gladys Hall. Rag dolls have featured in a number of children's stories, such as the 19th century character Golliwogg in The Adventures of Two Dutch Dolls and a Golliwogg by Bertha Upton and Florence K. Upton and Raggedy Ann in the books by Johnny Gruelle, first published in 1918. The Lonely Doll is a 1957 children's book by Canadian author Dare Wright. The story, told through text and photographs, is about a doll named Edith and two teddy bears.

== Works cited ==
- Fraser, Antonia (1973). Dolls. Octopus books. ISBN 978-0-7064-0056-4.
