= Yupʼik doll =

Eskimo style doll

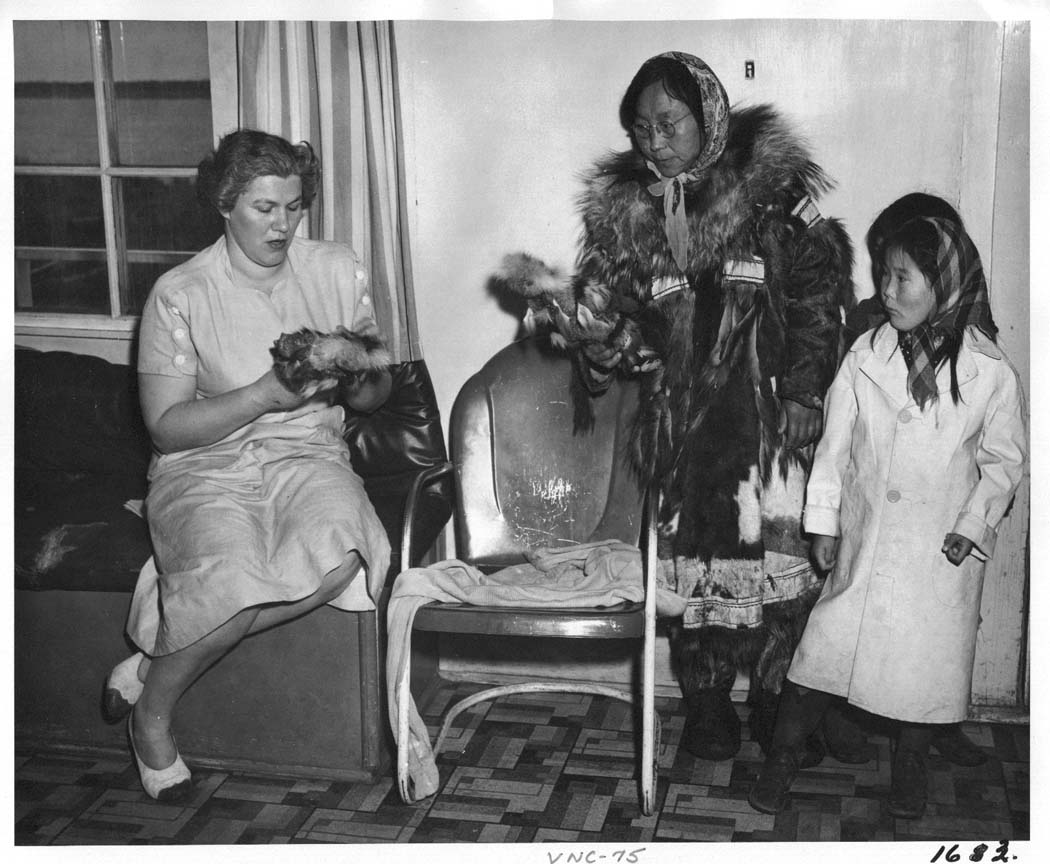
Yup'ik woman and her children with their fur dolls, which they offer for sale at the Bethel Roadhouse, 1949.

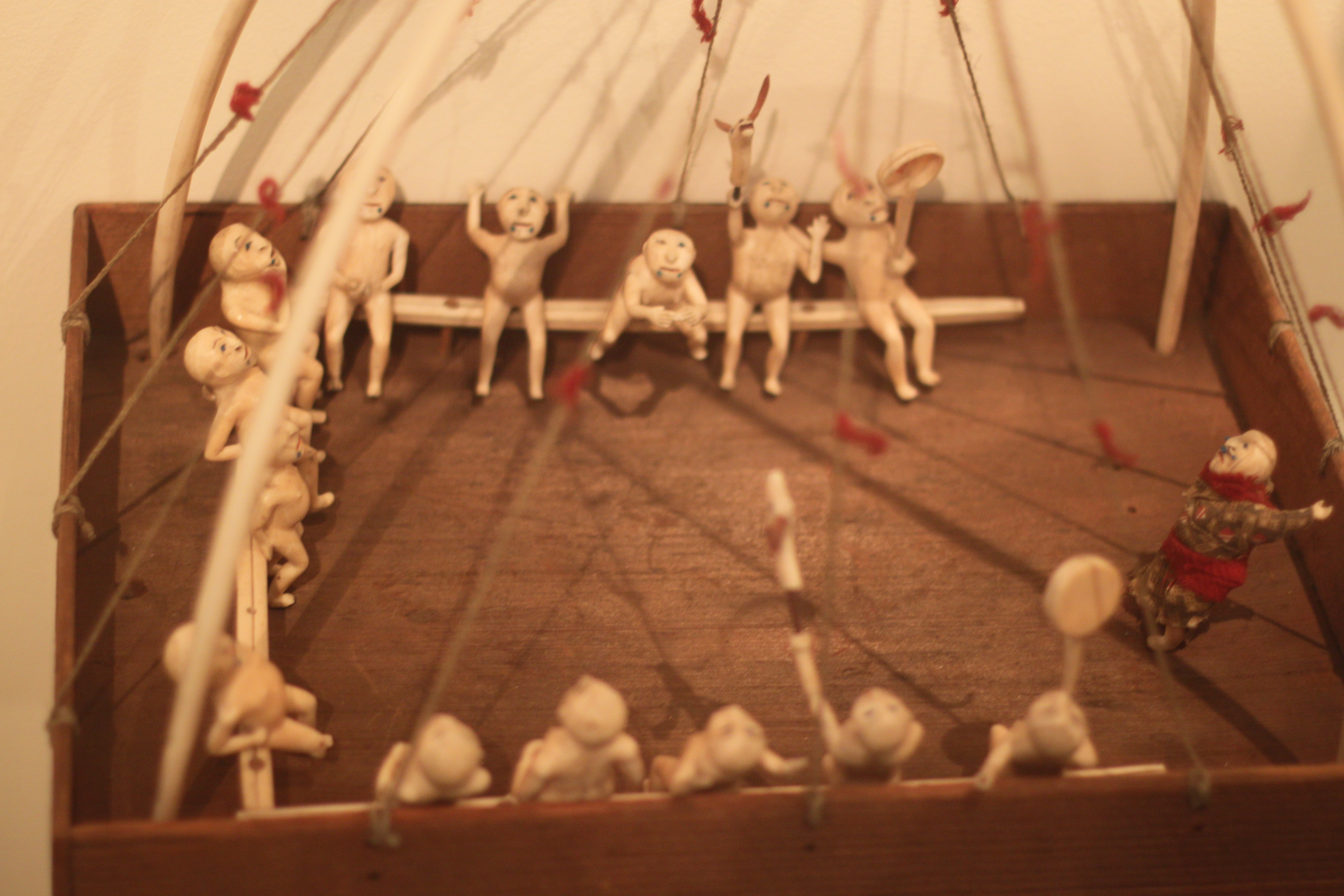
Wooden qasgiruaq (qasgiq model) with walrus ivory dolls. Ethnological Museum of Berlin.

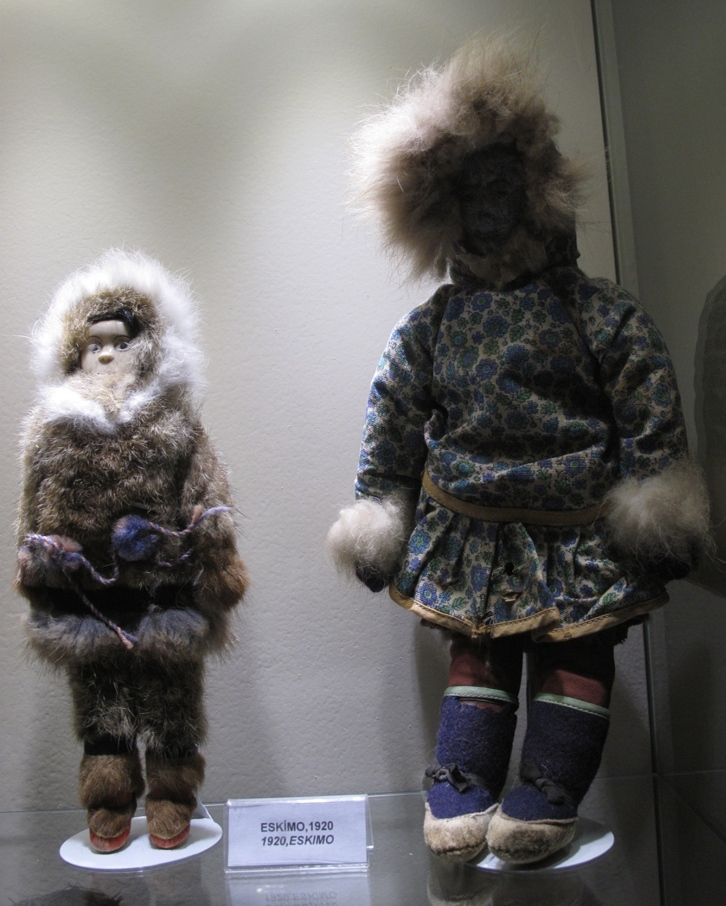
Yup'ik dolls with fur parka (left) and calico kuspuk (right), 1920, İstanbul Toy Museum (İstanbul Oyuncak Müzesi), Turkey.

Yup'ik doll (Yup'ik yugaq sg yugak dual yugat pl or yuguaq, irniaruaq, irnianguaq, inuguaq; also, yunguaq in Unaliq-Pastuliq dialect, sugaq, sugaruaq, suguaq in Bristol Bay dialect, cugaq, cugaruaq in Hooper Bay-Chevak dialect, cuucunguar in Nunivak dialect) is a traditional Eskimo style doll and figurine form made in the southwestern Alaska by Yup'ik people. Also known as Cup'ik doll for the Chevak Cup'ik dialect speaking Eskimos of Chevak and Cup'ig doll for the Nunivak Cup'ig dialect speaking Eskimos of Nunivak Island. Typically, Yup'ik dolls are dressed in traditional Eskimo style Yup'ik clothing (as irniaruam atkua "doll parka"), intended to protect the wearer from cold weather, and are often made from traditional materials obtained through food gathering. Play dolls from the Yup'ik area were made of wood, bone, or walrus ivory and measured from one to twelve inches in height or more. Male and female dolls were often distinguished anatomically and can be told apart by the addition of ivory labrets for males and chin tattooing for females. The information about play dolls within Alaska Native cultures is sporadic. As is so often the case in early museum collections, it is difficult to distinguish dolls made for play from those made for ritual. There were always five dolls making up a family: a father, a mother, a son, a daughter, and a baby. Some human figurines were used by shamans.

== Eskimo doll ==
Both Yup'ik, Siberian Yupik, and Iñupiaq dolls are also known as Eskimo doll in Alaska. It is possible to distinguish Yup'ik human figurines from Iñupiaq examples on the basis of facial features. Yup'ik figurines have a distinct brow line, shaped like two crescents joined at the center by the nose, whereas Iñupiaq figurines lack this brow line and have more pronounced noses and tiny eyes that look as through they had been poked in by the tip of a pencil or pen. The mouth of Yup'ik figurines mirror the crescent shape of the brows, whereas the Inupiaq dolls have small, straight mouths. Overall, the features of the Iñupiaq examples are crudely carved.

== Characteristics ==
Most had round wooden, walrus ivory or bone heads, ovoid-shaped eyes, and mouths, short necks, solid torsos, and arms that formed but not separated from the body. The faces of female dolls were frequently chin tattooed. Other decorations, including hairdressings, nose piercing earrings, was represented by hair and beads placed in the correct positions. Some even had bracelets and bead necklaces. The male dolls had labrets made from beads or bead pieces.

A relatively limited number of women in southwestern Alaska make coiled grass dolls, a spinoff of the coiled grass basketry practiced widely throughout the Yukon-Kuskokwim Delta.

Some non-traditional dolls seems as the influence of missionaries. Missionaries well understood that miniature human representations were powerful symbols, and influencing a native culture required reducing its central protectors to the realm of child’s play.

== Uses ==
Some human figurines were used by shamans. Along the lower Yukon River, Yup'ik Eskimo and Athabaskan shamans hung human figurines made of driftwood in trees to foretell the location of game.

Dolls also mediated the transition between childhood and adulthood in the Yup'ik shamanism. The centrality of play dolls in the lives of Yup'ik girls is evident from the role they assumed as the markers of seasons and life cycles. There was a strict rule against taking a doll outside during winter and breaking it was thought to bring endless cold and storms.

== History ==
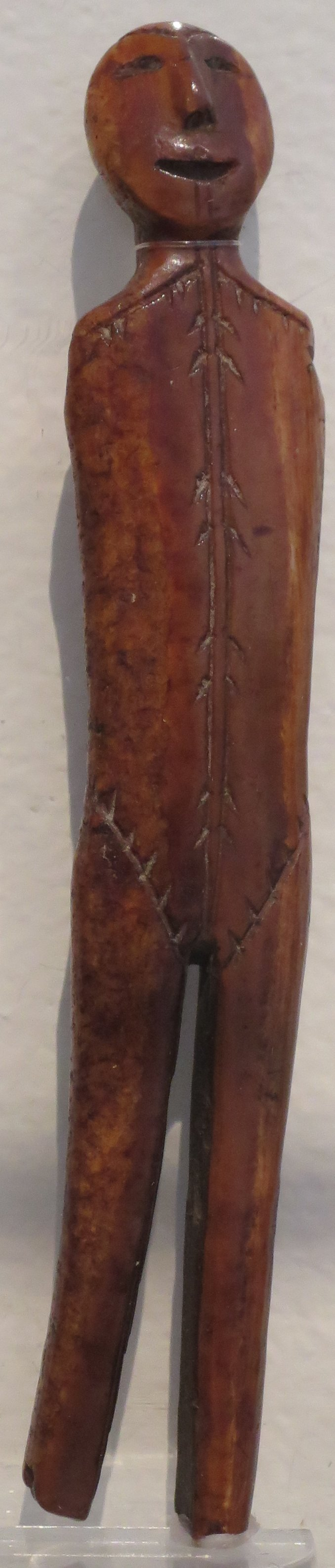
Eskimo human figurine, Honolulu Museum of Art.

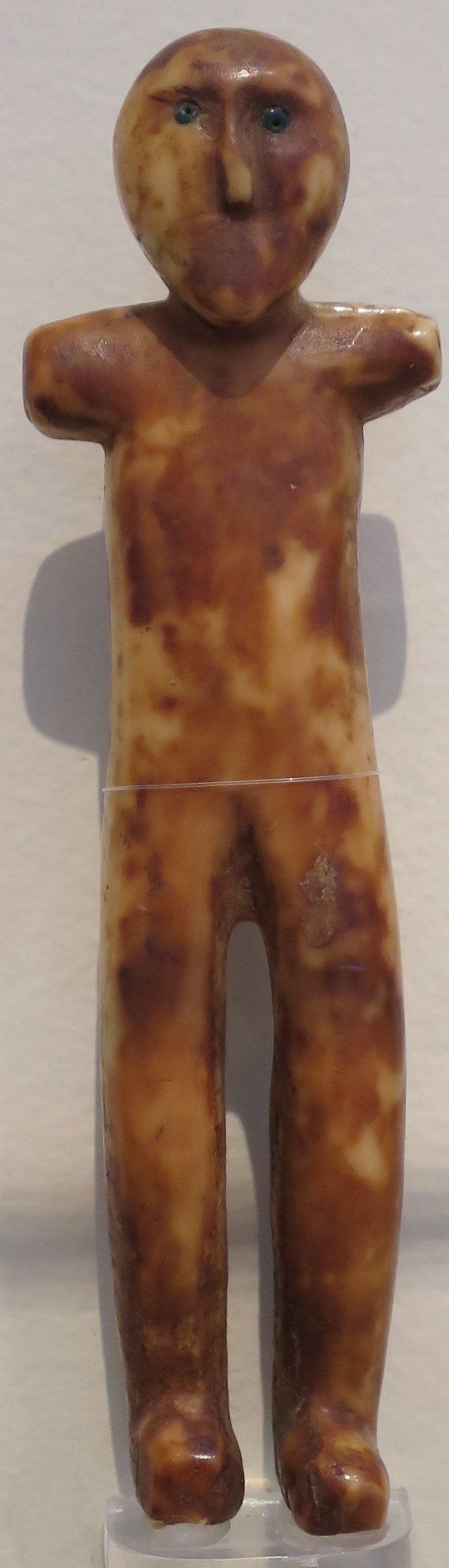
Eskimo human figurine, Honolulu Museum of Art.

For more than a thousand years, Alaska Native people have fashioned human figurines out of stone, bone, walrus ivory, rodent claws, trade cloth during the North American fur trade, and many other materials. Children played with such figurines (usually called dolls) but their other uses in both everyday and ceremonial life are less well known.

The collection of dolls and human miniatures from Alaska Native cultures at the University of Alaska Museum of the North includes several thousand figures from Alaska's prehistoric and early historic periods and is one of the largest and most representative public collections of historic and modern Alaska Native dolls in existence. All six ethnocultural groups in Alaska, the Iñupiaq and Yup'ik Eskimos, the Aleuts (Unangan) and Alutiiqs (Sugpiaq), and the Athabaskan and Northwest Coast Indians (as Eyak, Tlingit, Haida, Tsimshian) are represented in the collection, although the Central Yup'ik and St. Lawrence Island Siberian Yupik collections of human figures are largest.

Bering Strait region by far the largest number and oldest examples of human figurines from prehistoric Alaska (the Okvik period of Old Bering Sea cultures) have been excavated on and near St. Lawrence Island. Punuk sites from the nearby Punuk Islands yield figurines whose body style is similar to those of the Old Bering Sea cultures. Thule human figurines, unlike the preceding styles from the coast of Siberia and St. Lawrence Island, are found across the North American Arctic from the Bering Strait to Greenland.

The Nunalleq (lit. "old village") is an archaeological site of a Yup’ik winter village (or qasgiq) near the Quinhagak in the Yukon-Kuskokwim Delta region of Southwestern Alaska which has easily the largest collection of pre-contact Yup'ik material anywhere. The site was occupied circa 500-700 years ago, and is currently the scene of the largest archaeological excavation to have taken place in the Yukon-Kuskokwim Delta region of Alaska. The waterlogged and frozen tundra has led to the excellent preservation of organic materials and the recovery of rarely recovered artefacts such as anthropomorphic and zoomorphic figurines.

== See also ==
- Inuit doll
- Yupiit Piciryarait Cultural Center
