= Egli-Figuren =

Type of doll with movable limbs, originating in Switzerland

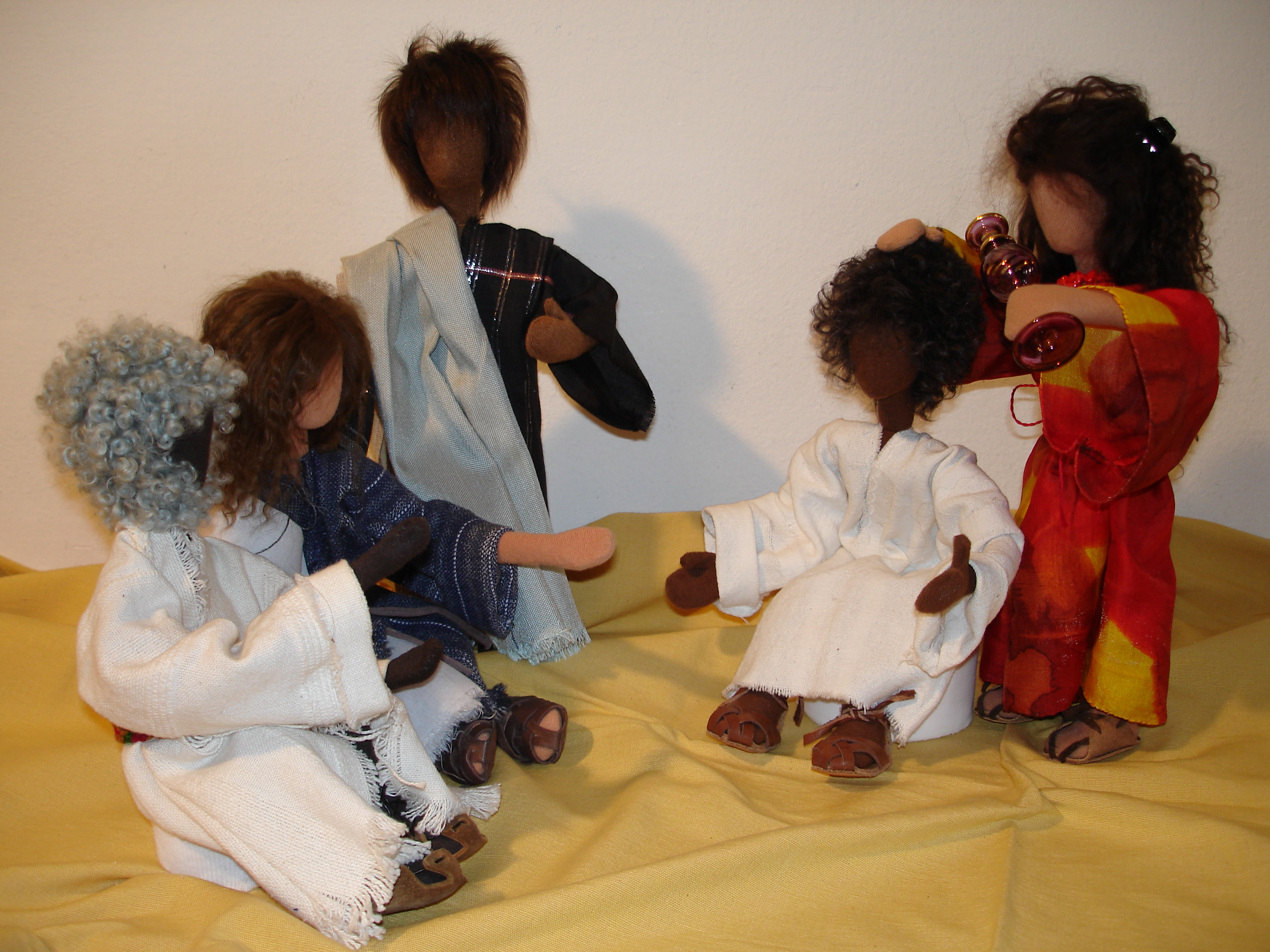
The anointing of Jesus displayed using Egli figures.

Egli-Figuren ("Egli figures" or Biblische Erzählfiguren) are a type of doll with movable limbs, originating in Switzerland in 1964, and popular in German Christian circles for telling Bible stories. The Arbeitsgemeinschaft Biblische Figuren ABF e.V. is one of the oldest associations promoting the puppets.
