= African dolls =

Dolls originating on the African continent

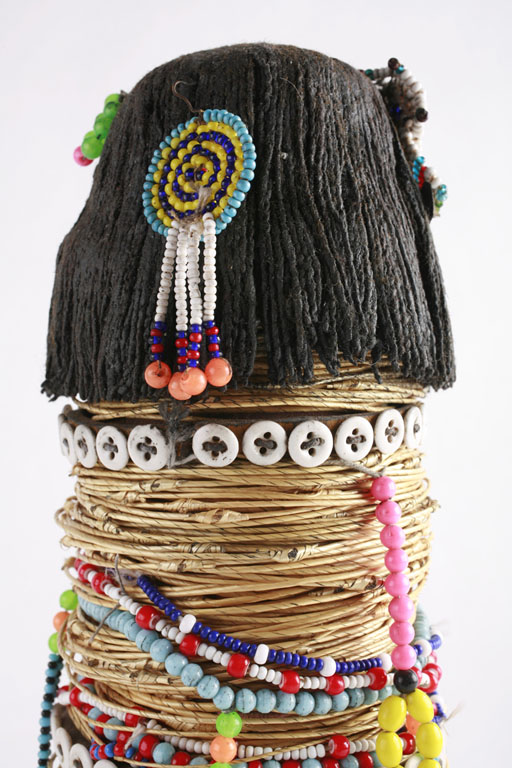
Ntwana beaded doll

African dolls across the continent are created for young girls to play with and as a charm to ensure fertility in women. Their shape and costume vary according to region and custom. Frequently dolls are handed down from mother to daughter. Western dolls are popular in Africa and are often dressed with traditional garb.

When the doll concept is considered in the context of African culture, they are usually not children's playthings, but rather objects that are laden with ritual and religious associations within the community. African dolls are used to teach, and entertain. They are supernatural intermediaries and they are manipulated for ritual purposes. Each of these dolls is unique because they are handmade and are traditionally handed down through generations.

== Ndebele dolls ==
Linga Koba dolls are from the Ndebele people in Southern Africa. One of the smallest tribes of the region, the Ndebele are noted for their painted homes of brilliant colors that stand out in the drab countryside. Their clothing is similarly colorful. The bead work on these Ndebele dolls is as detailed as the clothing of the women themselves.

During courtship, a suitor will place a doll outside a young woman's hut, indicating his intention to propose marriage to her. When a young woman is preparing to marry, she is given a doll that she names and cares for. Her first child is then named for the doll.

In addition to strengthening the Ndebele cultural identity, the beaded Ndebele dolls are now an important export item and much needed source of income for the Ndebele woman.

== Xhosa dolls ==
=== Xhosa fertility dolls ===
Xhosa fertility dolls are beaded dolls made and worn by Xhosa women. The doll is also known as the ‘love doll’. It is made in order to attract an eligible husband and also increase fertility in order to produce many children. The dolls are believed to have supernatural magic powers. Young Xhosa girls are encouraged by older Xhosa women to wear the dolls around their necks in order to increase their fertility during childbearing ages. The girls are usually given their first doll by their parents when they start their initiation practice. The girl will look after it carefully since it is believed that if it is lost or damaged there is a risk that when she has a child, it will die. After the birth of her first child the young mother will return the doll to her parents for use by a younger sister. Traditionally, young women should not openly display that they are looking for a husband therefore, it is customary for them to wear the ‘love dolls’ for attracting purposes in the nighttime. These secret necklaces usually consist of both a male and a female doll on a single necklace while those worn openly have only one doll attached to them. Married women also wear the dolls as a necklace in order to portray their desire to have children to the community and ancestors.

==== Characteristics ====
The dolls are made of small bottles, maize cobs, cartridge cases or small rolls of cotton sheeting which are then covered in beadwork. The doll is then incorporated in a necklace. In the early 20th century East London Museum had a collection of Xhosa fertility dolls which were described as ‘impressionistic’ at the time. Currently all dolls are made with glass beads and glass beads have therefore become an integral part of the Xhosa tradition.

=== Hut dolls ===
The Xesibe (a Xhosa tribe from the Eastern Cape) also have a practise of using "hut dolls". These dolls are carved of wood and put on the roof of the hut of a childless or seemingly infertile woman by a diviner as a plea to the ancestors to send a baby to the home. The doll may or may not have beads on it. It is left on the roof until a baby is born when it is taken down and burned with the placenta of the child.

== See also ==
- Akuabaj
- Pondo people
- AbaThembu
