= Layli (Luri doll) =

Hinged dancing doll, popular among Lurs

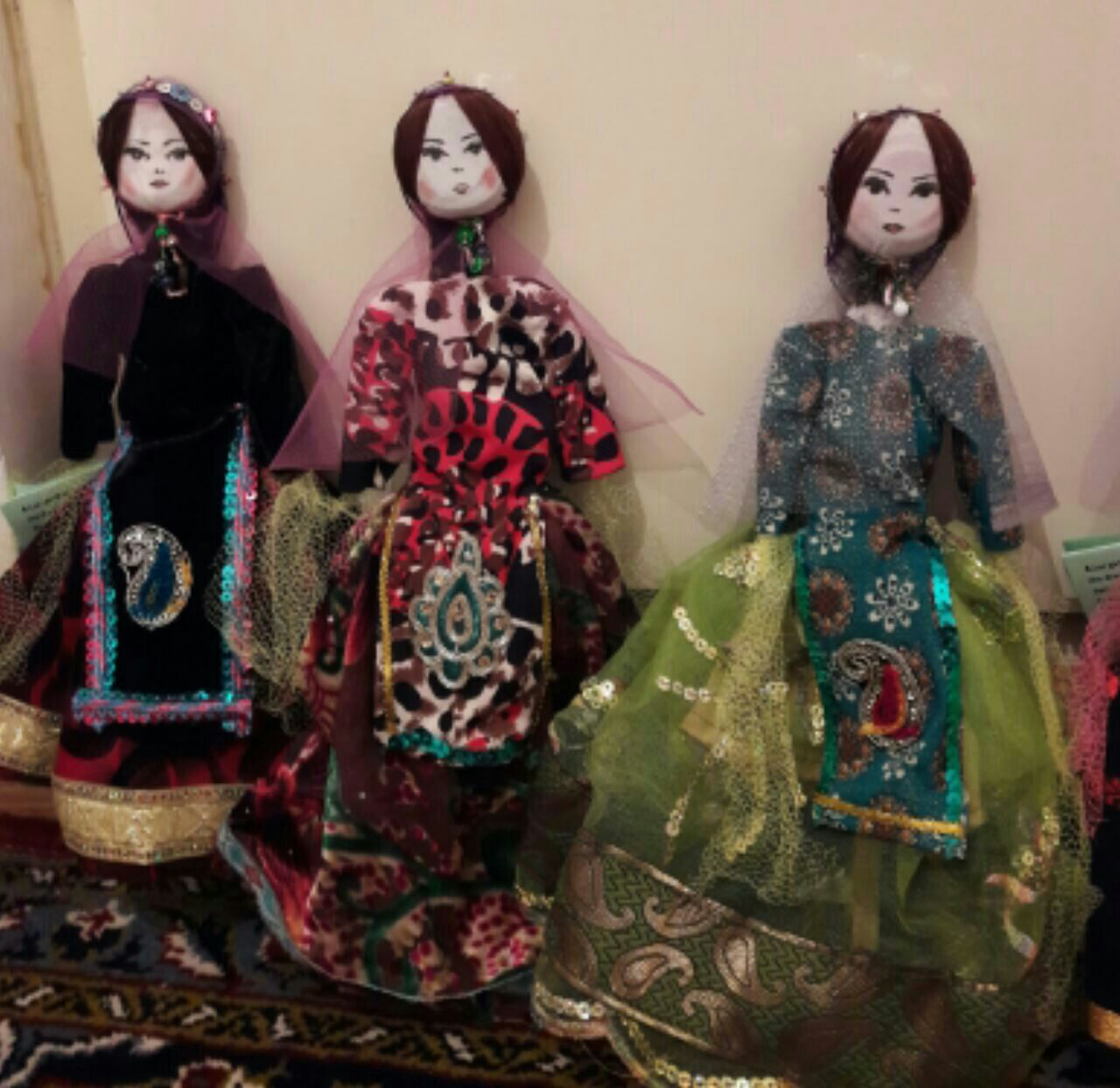
- Layli dolls from Mamasani
- Type: Dancing doll
- Country: Iran

Layli, or Leyli (Luri=لَیلی), also Bahig or Bavig, is a hinged dancing doll, which is popular among Lur people of Iran (mainly Bakhtiaries and Southern Lurs).

== Etymology ==
The name Layli is originated from the Middle East folklore and love story; Layla and Majnun. Layli is the symbol of the beloved who is spiritually beautiful. The name Bavig (Bahig) in Luri means bride. The word refers to the femininity, youth and vitality of this puppet character.

== Structure and function ==
Children can make the doll dance by pulling a string that is tied to their hands. The structure of this hinged doll is simple and noteworthy. Natural materials are used except for the embellishments such as sequins, glass beads and colourful ribbons. Dolls, puppets and masks allow ordinary people to state what is impossible in the real situation; for example in the Qajar era in Iran, people criticised the politics and social conditions of Ahmad-Shah's reign via puppetry without any fear of punishment. Leyli also represents and maintains a cultural tradition, which is gradually vanishing in urban life. Indeed, as they moved from villages to the cities to enhance their living standards, women gradually began to wear the chador and manto (Iranian public overalls) as general outer garments, with a limited range of colours. This has led to uniformity among the newcomers in the city who were originally from different tribes.
