= Ayilo =

Ghanaian term for Bentonite clay

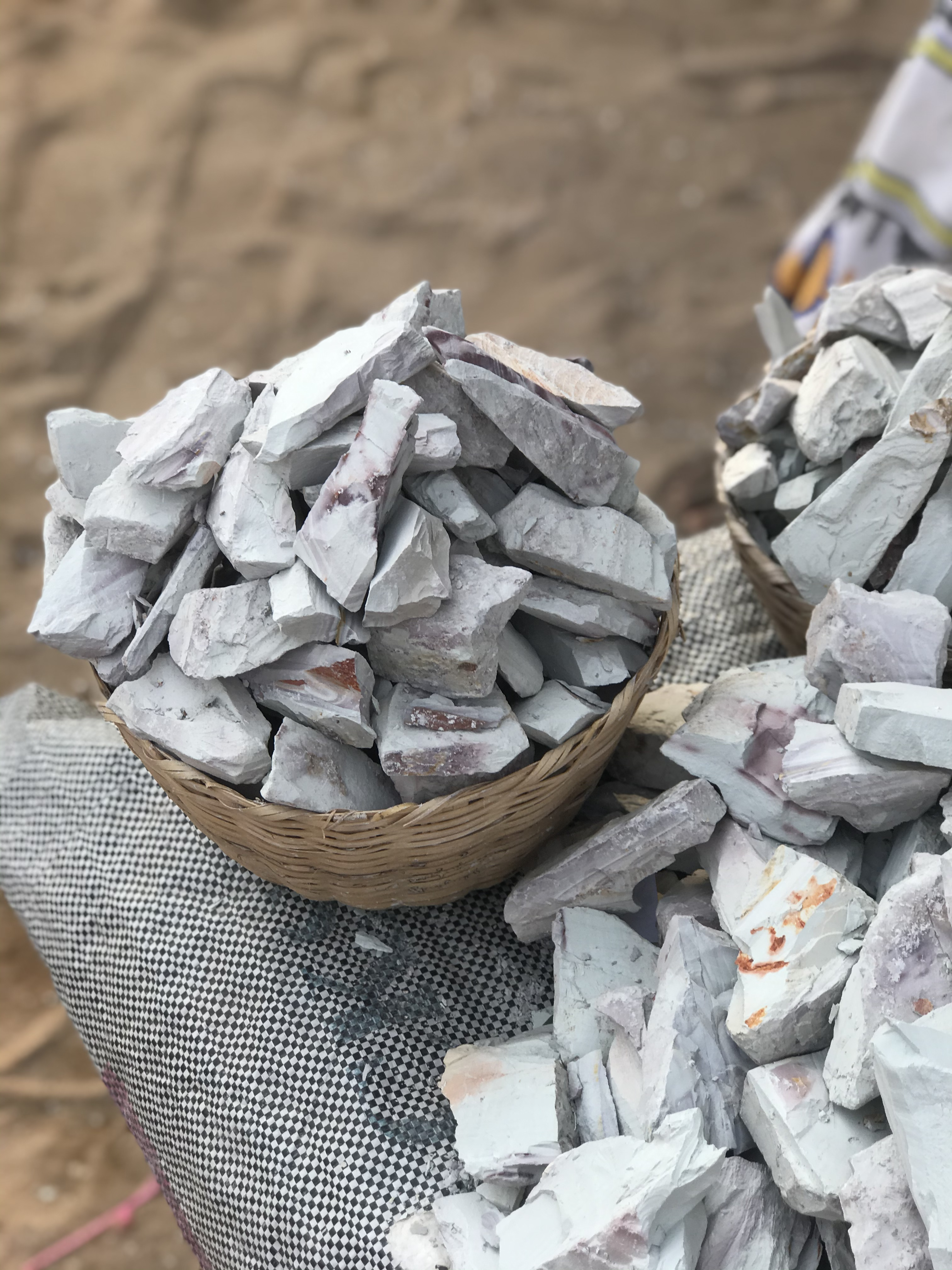
Ayilo in Ghana

Ayilo, also known as ayilor, hyile, and ferinkasa, is a Ghanaian term for bentonite clay. It is a baked solid white clay usually taken by pregnant women. They are usually baked into egg-shaped balls. Ewes call it agatawoe/agatawe, Gas called it ayilo, English call it kaolin and the Akans call it shirew/shile. Ayilo is mined primarily from a village in the Volta Region. It is first mined in the form of colored kaolin rocks from deep down the land. The rocks are then broken into smaller fragments and the colored parts are peeled off before pounding or grinding into powder. The powdered clay is mixed with water and shaped into egg like pieces and sun baked.

== Production ==
Ayilo is produced from kaolin-tye clay that is industrially or informally mined, chiefly from deposits at Anfoega in the Volta Region of Ghana. The clay is dug from deep in the ground, broken up, and the raw ore is milled or ground into a fine powder, larger particles and blocks are removed in this process. The powdered clay is mixed with water into a uniform paste, which is molded commonly into egg-shaped or sausage-shaped pieces and then baked or sun-dried to reduce its moisture content and firm up its shape; in some cases it is also smoked to add aroma. The finished product is distributed to markets throughout Ghana.

== Consumption and reasons for use ==
Eating ayilo is a recognized instance of geophagy, and clinical literature classifies deliberate, repeated consumption of non-food substances such as clay, as a form of pica. A 2019 study of pregnant women attending antenatal clinics in the Ho municipality of Ghana found a geophapy prevalence of 48.4% among the 217 women surveyed, and reported comparable prevalence figures (ranging from roughly 28% to 57%) from earlier studies conducted in Accra, Kumasi, and other Ghana localities. In that study, women most commonly cited the clay's smell and taste as reasons for eating it, alongside cravings, peer or family influence, and traditional beliefs that it relieves nausea, vomiting, and other pregnancy-related discomfort, or that it can quench hunger. Many researchers reported having first tried clay in childhood, before continuing or resuming the practice in adulthood or during pregnancy.

== Health considerations ==
Multiple peer-reviewed studies have examined the mineral and microbial content of processed clay sold in Ghana as ayilo. The 2019 Ho municipality study detected the essential minerals - iron, copper, zinc, potassium, magnesium, and sodium in the clay, but also found traces of the toxic elements - arsenic, manganese, lead, and nickel; the study's authors concluded that although the clay contains some beneficial minerals, the accumulated effects of these heavy metals could contribute to complications during pregnancy. The same study found common soil bacteria and fungi including Bacillus, Pseudomonas, Mucor, and Aspergillus species in the clay samples, some of which are associated with gastrointestinal infection and other illness in humans. A 2016 study of clay sold in Accra and Koforidua markets similarly isolated fecal coliform bacteria, including Klebsiella, Escherichia, Shigella, and Enterobacter species, as well as, staphylococci, from clay samples. Most of the pregnant women surveyed in the 2019 study who said they were aware of side effects of geophapy named anaemia and constipation as the common concerns.

== Cultural context ==
Ayilo is most closely linked with Anfoega in the Volta Region, where much of the clay sold under this name is mined, though it is also sold in markets in Accra and elsewhere in Ghana. It is generally regarded as a craving food, especially among pregnant women, and is also marketed as a beauty or skin-care product; some women use the clay externally, applying it to their skin as well as eating it. Both traditional market sellers and some modern retailers offer the product, reflecting its continued presence in daily life alongside its more specialized role during pregnancy.

== Other countries ==
Ayilo is known as mabele in the Democratic Republic of the Congo, in Cameroon as calaba, and Nsu in Nigeria.

== See also ==
Geophagia Pica (disorder) Kaolin Bentonite

== External Link ==
|Video: AYILO or SHILE | how to prepare white clay | How AYILO is prepared | BENTONITE CLAY
