= Paddle doll =

Type of ancient Egyptian figurine

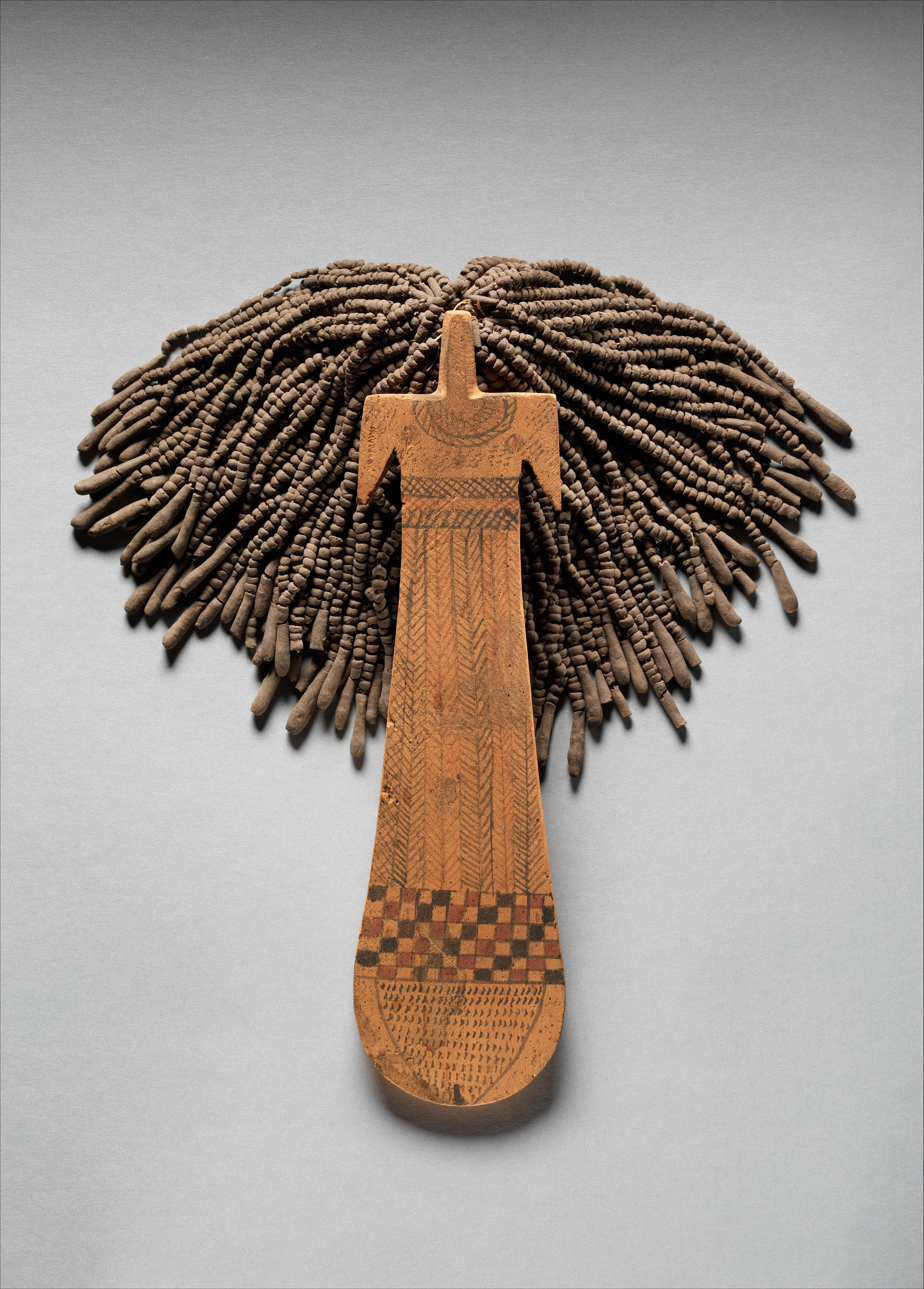
The front of a Middle Kingdom paddle doll dated approximately from 2030 B.C.E to 1802 B.C.E.

Paddle dolls are a type of ancient Egyptian female figurine that have been excavated from various tombs. Paddle dolls have been found in burials from the late Sixth Dynasty to the Thirteenth Dynasty from tombs in Asasif, Beni Hassan, Naga el-Deir, Rifeh, Sheikh Farag and Thebes. The period of their greatest popularity seems to have been the late Eleventh and early Twelfth Dynasties.

== Form ==
Paddle dolls are made of thin pieces of wood which depict the torso of a woman with truncated arms and no legs. Thick "hair" is represented by small beads strung along string, which are often made from black mud. The necks often are adorned with collars, and the torso with a patterned textile or other jewellery. The breasts and pubic triangle are painted on and Morris notes that "extraordinary prominence given to the pubic triangle" and "pubic triangles are the one constant in the iconic repertoire of the paddle dolls." They will often also have tattoos in diamond shapes, and in the forms of deities or animals. One such example is a frog found on the reverse side of a paddle doll now at the Egypt Centre, Swansea.

== Function ==
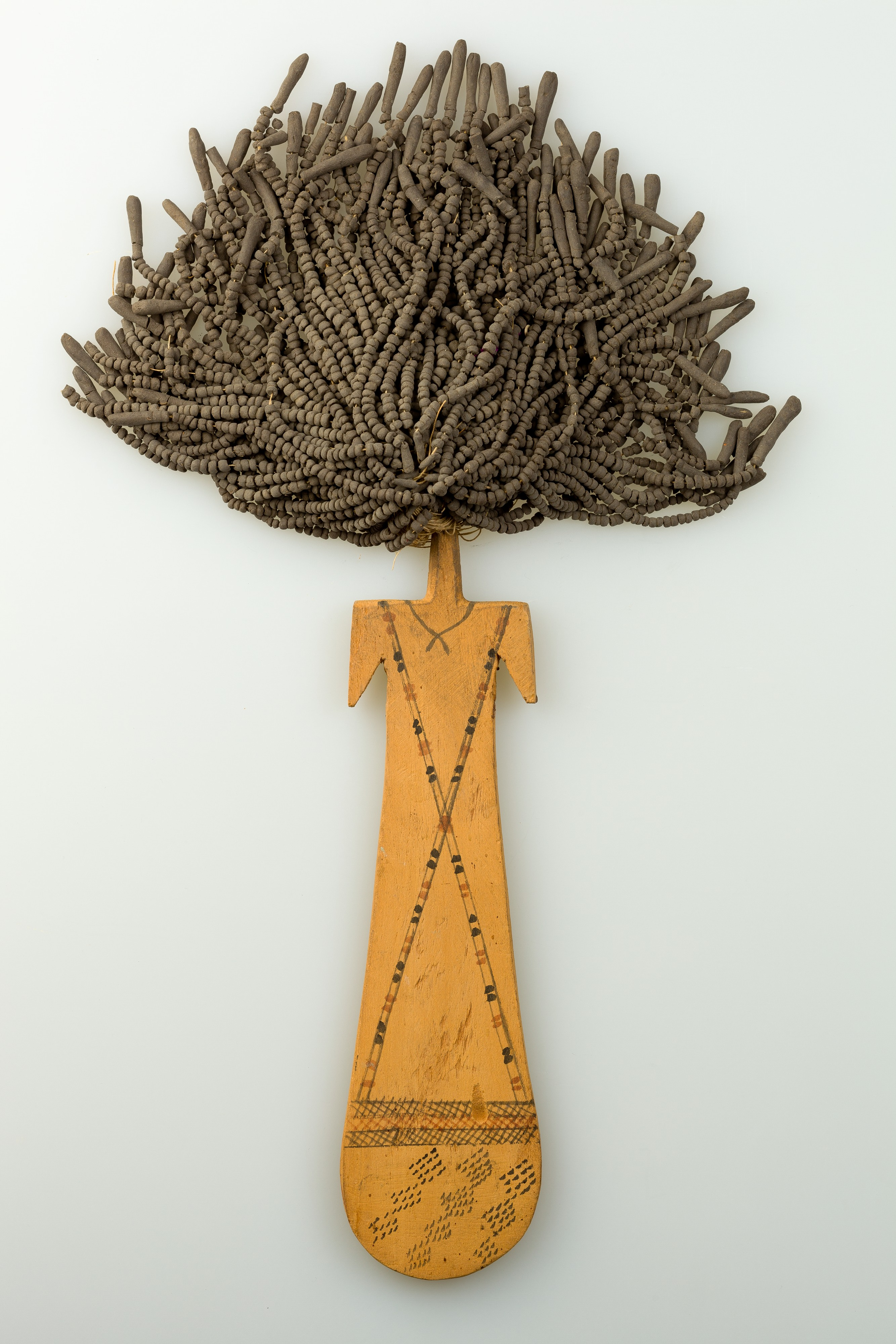
The back of a Middle Kingdom paddle doll dated approximately from 2030 B.C.E to 1802 B.C.E.

Egyptologists have determined that paddle dolls represent female members of the Theban khener-troupe of singers and dancers that served at religious ceremonies for the goddess Hathor and were perhaps appended by Nebhepetre to his royal mortuary cult at Deir el-Bahari. This claim is supported by multiple lines of evidence.

1. The location of where paddle dolls have been excavated serves as evidence to this claim. A large majority of paddle dolls have been found in Theban burials. The khener-troupe of performers were from Thebes, which is where the cult of Hathor was located.
2. The same tattoos found on the body of the Priestess of Hathor and Sole Royal Ornament Amunet and the female bodies found in the same burial courtyard have been found on paddle dolls. The exact type of diamond-shaped configurations found on the body were discovered in the same regions (shoulders, thighs, and/or buttocks) of various paddle dolls excavated from multiple tombs.
3. There are parallels between the outfits worn by the khener women and those depicted on paddle dolls. A thin beaded top that was known to be worn by the khener-troupe dancers has been witnessed on some paddle dolls. The most commonly found example is a checkerboard pattern that covers the public region.
4. Paddle dolls were commonly excavated near clappers, one of the most typical instruments used by khener-troupes in order to keep a rhythm. Additionally, the figurines were often discovered in groups that mirrored the composition of real troupes of musicians and dancers.

== Previous Claims ==
Many early theorizations regarding paddle dolls' uses have lost support as they relied on assumptions and interpretations, while the more recent studies linking paddle dolls to the Theban khener-troupe are supported by multiple lines of evidence and research. One discarded hypothesis identified the artifacts as fertility symbols placed in burials to guarantee eternal rebirth. The hypothesis stated the paddle dolls’ emphasis on feminine attributes such as the breast, hips, and pubic area symbolized the sexual aspects of regeneration. This hypothesis was formed solely on the shape of the artifact and had no research to support the claim.

Another claim argued that paddle dolls were intended for similar purposes as the meant necklaces. Priestesses of Hathor honored the goddess Hathor by shaking meant necklaces, which were made of a long, flat plate with a bulb at the bottom and many strands of stringed beads at the top. Early theorizations suggested paddle dolls were intended for noise-making or used as toys; however, it is probable that the paddle dolls would not have been able to withstand vigors shaking. This allows Egyptologists to rule out the idea that they were meant to be shaken to produce a sound.
