= Inuit doll =

Dolls made by indigenous Arctic people

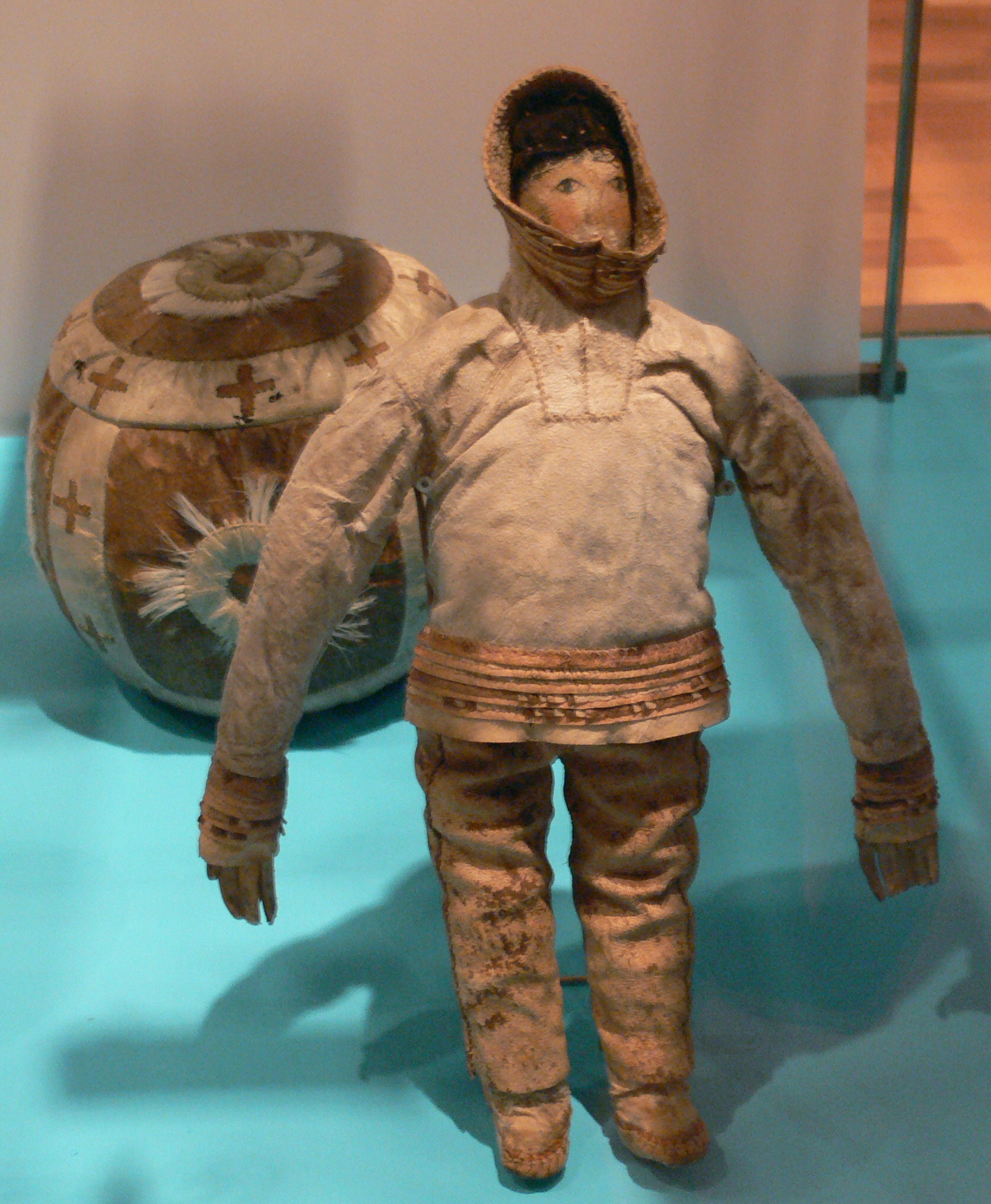
Greenlandic Inuit doll at the Stuttgart, Linden-Museum

Inuit dolls are made out of soapstone and bone, materials common to the people of northern Alaska, Greenland and northern Canada. Many are clothed with animal fur or skin. Their clothing articulates the traditional style of dress necessary to survive cold winters, wind, and snow. Dolls could have been gifts to young Inuit girls, to be used as teaching devices and passing down of culture. With these dolls, young girls learn various skills necessary for their survival such as skin preparation, cutting and sewing, proper use of materials, designs and significance of symbols in their cultures. Inuit dolls were enjoyed by both young and old Inuit individuals and give an excellent insight into Inuit culture.

== History ==
The earliest found dolls were made by Inuit living in Brooman Point Village, on Bathurst Island in what is now Nunavut, over 2,000 years ago. Since the migration of humans over the land bridge, known as Beringia in the Bering Strait, these dolls were common in Inuit culture. While the history of creating these dolls are unknown, the tradition may have started over 1,000 years ago. There are at least two different types of Inuit dolls from the Canadian region, play dolls and collector's dolls.

=== Play dolls ===
Traditionally by the age of ten, Inuit girls were taught by their mothers how the clothe a family. This is mainly taught by learning to sew and making their own dolls with removable clothing. They learn about the roles of wives and mothers by playing with these dolls. Once Inuit moved to camps, and later to settlements, children began going to school and started learning different kinds of lessons and experiences. Because of this change in education, play dolls began disappearing and the last generation of Inuit girls to grow up with the play dolls were from the early 1950s.

=== Collector's dolls ===
These dolls were typically made by Inuit for people in the south. Some are owned by museums and others are owned by private collectors and institutions. The collector's dolls were divided into four categories: dolls dressed in traditional fur garments, wearing fabric garments, made by elders from Spence Bay (Taloyoak), and lastly made by the best dollmakers in the same community.

The dolls made by elders are full of energy and imagination. They are sculptures made from fur and fabric. Some are reminders of what the Inuit culture used to be like and others are just fantasy of the imagination the dollmaker. The dolls made by Spence Bay's best dollmakers are full of intense artistry. Dolls could have been made from caribou antler to create a certain texture. Dollmakers could have also used soapstone to create eyes and generate certain emotions and feelings. Dollmakers have also made dolls specifically called packing dolls that generally wear an amauti. Packing dolls refer to dolls that have a parka that is designed with a baby pouch tailored as part of the mother's clothing.

== See also ==
- Yupʼik doll
