= Akuaba =

Ghanaian wooden fertility dolls

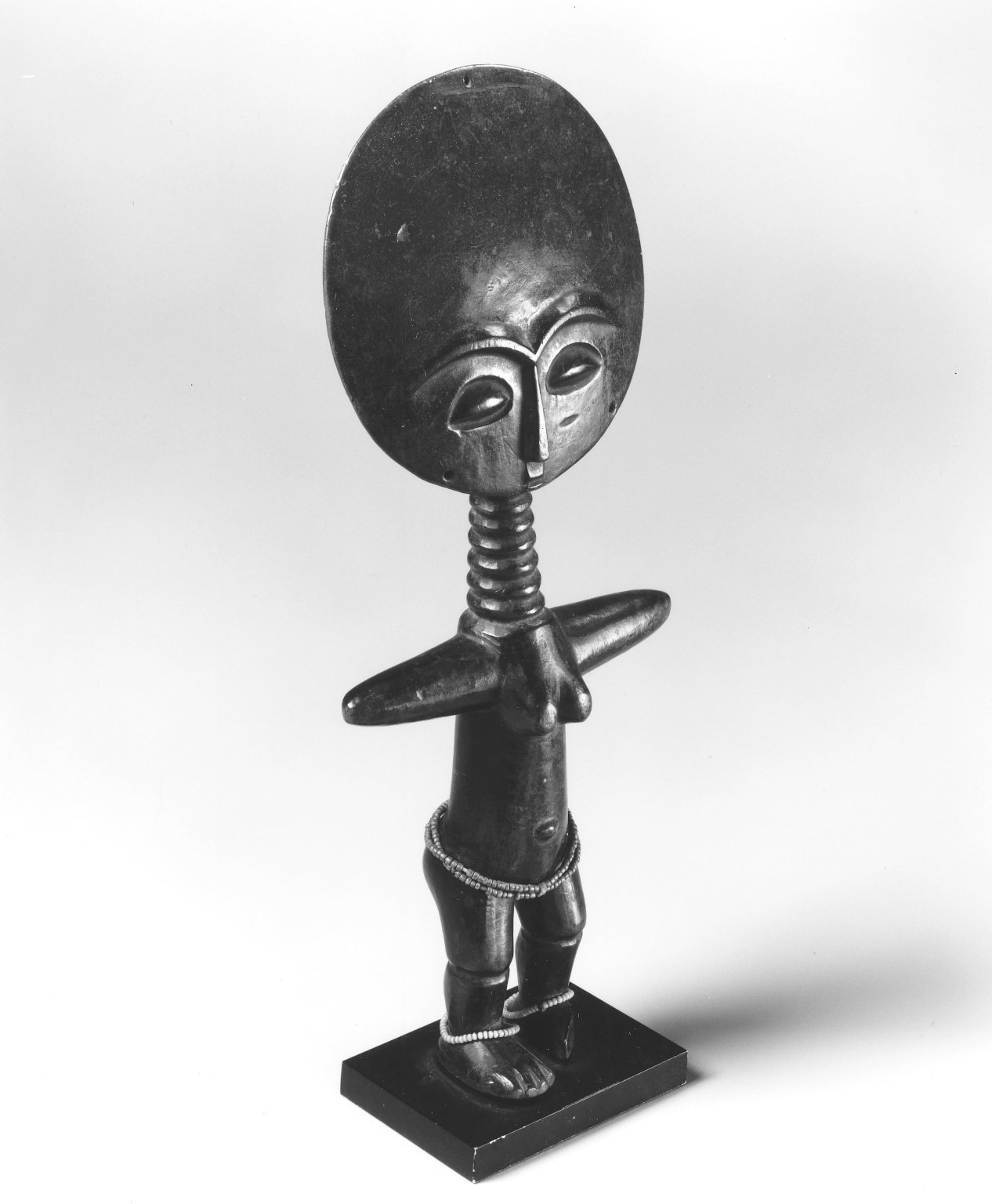
Brooklyn Museum 1997.101.1 Doll Akuaba (2)

Akua'ba, also spelled akwaba or akuba, are wooden ritual fertility dolls originating from western Ghana and nearby regions. They are particularly associated with the Fanti people, who are part of the Akan group of ethnicities in Ghana and Ivory Coast. The dolls are characterized by their large, disc-like heads and are used traditionally by young women seeking to conceive a child or to ensure the attractiveness of their future children.

When not in use, akua'ba are ritually washed and cared for in the traditional homestead. The treatment of the akua'ba has been described as an example of traditional beliefs that corresponds to many traditional beliefs in West African sympathetic magic.

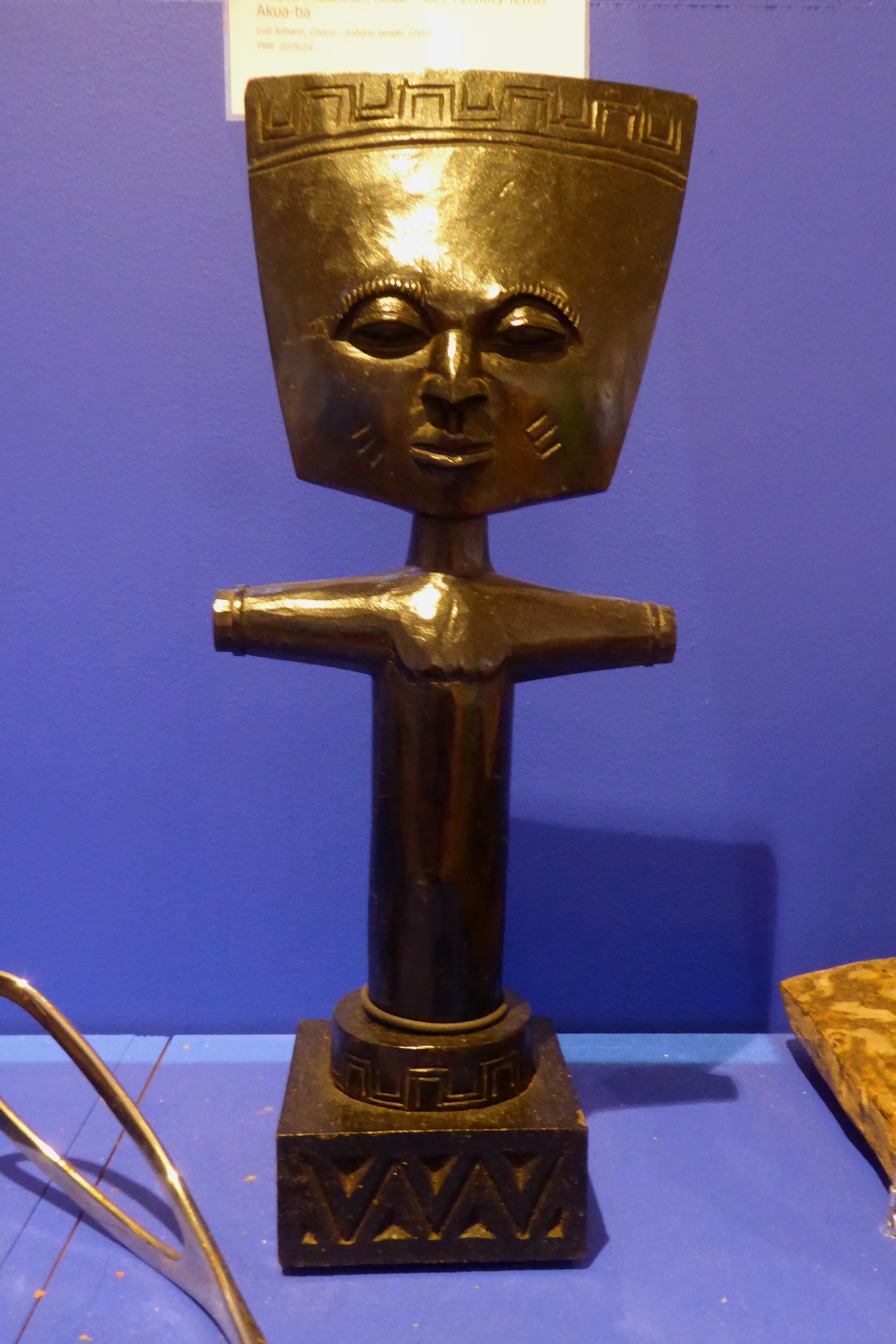
Akuaba in the National Ethnographic Museum, Warsaw

While the Fanti are best known for their akua'ba, other tribes in the West African region, such as the Kru and Igbo people, have their own distinctive styles of fertility dolls. These dolls are often used in similar ways, reflecting the importance of fertility and children in many West African cultures.

== History ==
The Akuaba symbol has its origins in the Akan people, specifically among the Ashanti, where it was traditionally used in fertility rituals. Women carried Akuaba dolls carved from wood and adorned with beads as part of a spiritual practice intended to invoke blessings for conception and safe childbirth. Over time, the iconic representation of the doll became an Adinkra symbol, capturing the essence of motherhood, beauty, and protection in Akan culture.

Akua'ba dolls were also taken to the Americas by enslaved Africans, where they served as symbols of connection to their ancestral homeland and were used as good luck charms. Europeans who visited Africa, particularly during the 1800s, were highly interested in Fante dolls, leading to their popularity in many museums in Europe.

== Contemporary usage ==
Today, akua'ba dolls are more commonly seen as mass-produced works of art or souvenirs rather than as heirlooms in ritual use. However, traditional use of these dolls continues in some areas among the Fante and other Akan peoples. The form of the akua'ba has also become a symbol of good luck more broadly. The symbol has gained wider recognition as a representation of African cultural heritage and artistic expression.

== See also ==
- African dolls
- Ankh
