= Tikchik River =

- Location of the mouth of the Tikchik River in Alaska

Location
- Country: United States
- State: Alaska
- Census Area: Dillingham

Physical characteristics
- Source: Nishlik Lake
  - location: Kuskokwim Mountains, Wood-Tikchik State Park
  - coordinates: 60°26′26″N 158°50′42″W
  - elevation: 1,025 ft (312 m)
- Mouth: Tikchik Lake
  - location: 65 miles (105 km) north of Dillingham
  - coordinates: 59°59′00″N 158°20′28″W
  - elevation: 305 ft (93 m)
- Length: 45 mi (72 km)

The Tikchik River is a 45 miles (72 km) long stream in the U.S. state of Alaska. Beginning at Nishlik Lake in the Kuskokwim Mountains, it flows southeast into Tikchik Lake, 65 miles (105 km) north of Dillingham. Tikchik Lake empties into the Nuyakuk River, a tributary of the Nushagak River, which flows to Nushagak Bay, an arm of Bristol Bay.

Water from Upnuk Lake flows about 10 miles (16 km) to join the river downstream of Nishlik Lake. Both lakes and the river lie within Wood-Tikchik State Park, at 1.6 million acres (6,500 km^{2}) the largest state park in the United States.

Alaska Fishing says the river "makes an exciting float...with some potentially good fishing...". Boating dangers include overhanging vegetation and bears, which feed on salmon. The main game fish frequenting the Tikchik are Arctic grayling, char, and red salmon, as well as lake trout in the lakes.

== See also ==
- List of rivers of Alaska
