= Geography of Alaska =

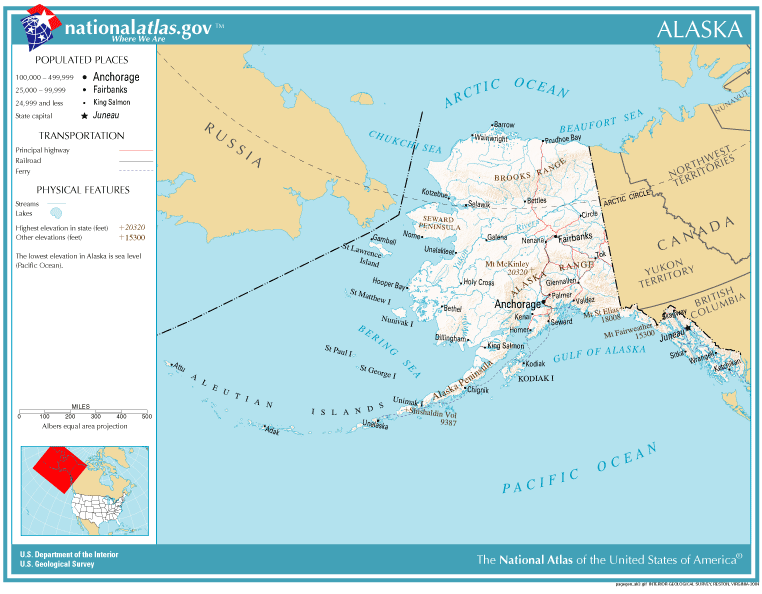
General map of Alaska.

Alaska occupies the northwestern portion of the North American continent and is bordered only by Canada on the east. It is one of two U.S. states not bordered by another state; Hawaii is the other. Alaska has more ocean coastline than all of the other U.S. states combined. About 500 miles (800 km) of Canadian territory, consisting of British Columbia, separate Alaska from the U.S. state of Washington. Alaska is thus an exclave of the United States that is part of the Continental United States and the U.S. West Coast, but is not part of the Contiguous United States.

The state is bordered by Yukon and British Columbia, Canada, to the east, the Gulf of Alaska and the Pacific Ocean to the south, Asian Russia (Chukotka Autonomous Okrug), Bering Sea, the Bering Strait, and the Chukchi Sea to the west, and the Beaufort Sea and the Arctic Ocean to the north.

Because it extends into the Eastern Hemisphere very close to Asia, it is technically both the westernmost and easternmost state in the United States, as well as also being the northernmost. It is also the largest by a significant degree.

== Size and location ==
Alaska's area compared to the 48 contiguous states.

Alaska is the largest state in the United States in terms of land area at 570,380 square miles (1,477,300 km^{2}), over twice (roughly 2.47 times) as large as Texas, the next largest state, and is the seventh largest country subdivision in the world, and the third largest in North America, about 20.4% smaller than Denmark's autonomous country of Greenland and 17.6% smaller than Canada's largest territory of Nunavut. If the state's westernmost point were superimposed on San Francisco, California, its easternmost point would be in Jacksonville, Florida. Alaska is larger than all but 18 sovereign nations, being slightly larger than Iran but slightly smaller than Libya.

The Aleutian Islands cross longitude 180°, so Alaska can be considered the easternmost state as well as the westernmost. Alaska and, especially, the Aleutians are one of the extreme points of the United States. The International Date Line jogs west of 180° to keep the whole state, and thus the entire continental United States, within the same legal day.

== Regions ==
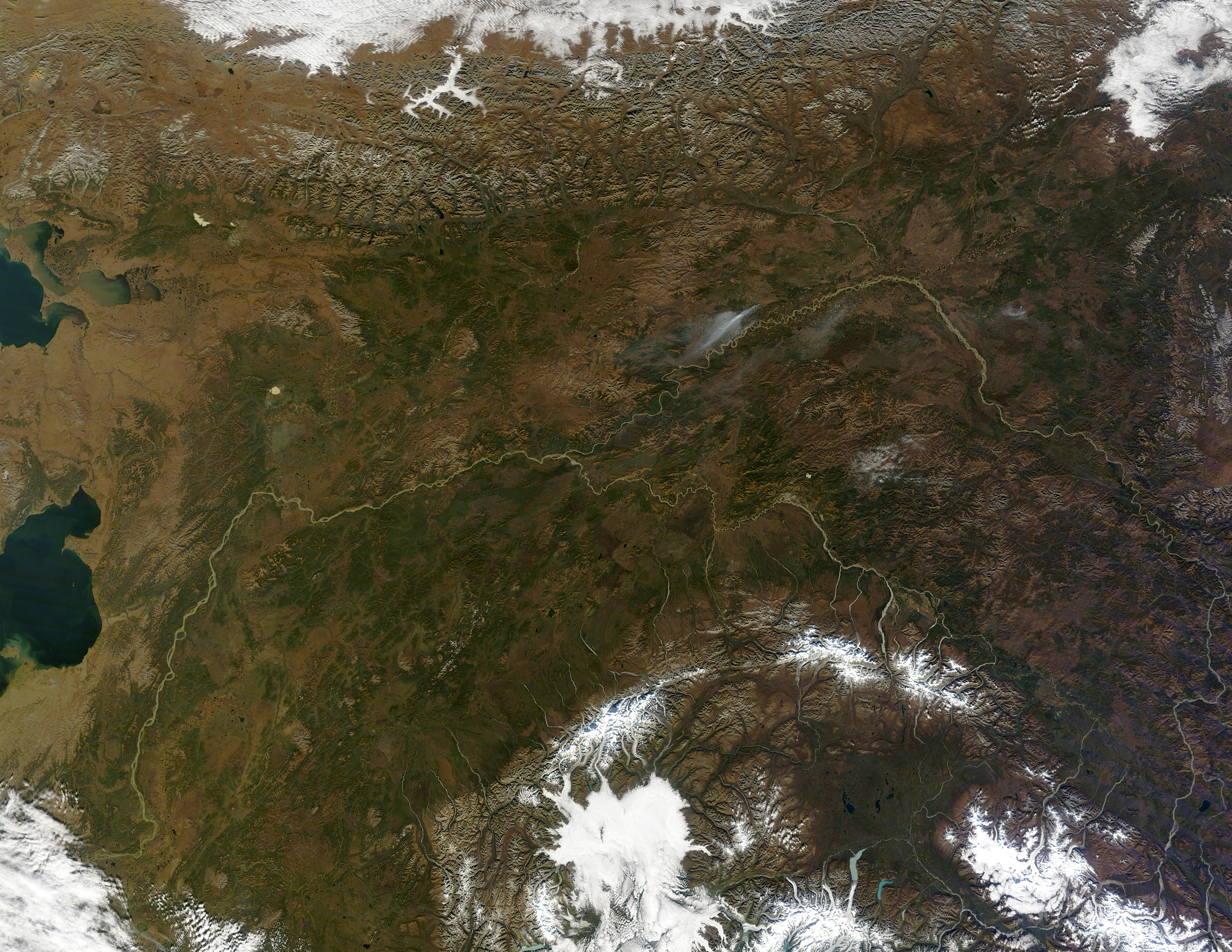
Central Alaska in late September 2010, as seen from a satellite.

- South Central Alaska is the southern coastal region and contains most of the state's population. Anchorage and many growing towns, such as Palmer, and Wasilla, lie within this area. Petroleum industrial plants, transportation, tourism, and two military bases form the core of the economy here.
- The Alaska Panhandle, also known as Southeast Alaska, is home to many of Alaska's larger towns including the state capital Juneau, tidewater glaciers and extensive forests. Tourism, fishing, forestry and state government anchor the economy.
- Southwest Alaska is largely coastal, bordered by both the Pacific Ocean and the Bering Sea. It is sparsely populated, and unconnected to the road system, but it is incredibly important to the fishing industry. Half of all fish caught in the western U.S. come from the Bering Sea, and Bristol Bay has the world's largest sockeye salmon fishery. Southwest Alaska includes Katmai and Lake Clark national parks as well as numerous wildlife refuges. The region comprises western Cook Inlet, Bristol Bay and its watersheds, the Alaska Peninsula and the Aleutian Islands. It is known for wet and stormy weather, tundra landscapes, and large populations of salmon, brown bears, caribou, birds, and marine mammals.
- The Alaska Interior is home to Fairbanks. The geography is marked by large braided rivers, such as the Yukon River and the Kuskokwim River, as well as Arctic tundra lands and shorelines.

The Alaskan Bush typically refers to any region of the state that is not connected to the North American road network and does not have ready access to the state's ferry system. It is the remote, less crowded part of the state, encompassing 380 native villages and small towns such as Nome, Bethel, Kotzebue and, most famously, Utqiaġvik, the northernmost town in the United States. The northeast corner of Alaska is covered by the Arctic National Wildlife Refuge. Much of the northwest is covered by the larger National Petroleum Reserve–Alaska, which covers around 23 million acres (9,307,770 ha). The Arctic is Alaska's most remote wilderness. A location in the National Petroleum Reserve–Alaska is 120 miles (190 km) from any town or village, the geographic point most remote from permanent habitation in the United States.

== Landforms ==
Alaska is home to 3 million lakes. Marshlands and wetland permafrost cover 188,320 square miles (487,700 km^{2}) (mostly in northern, western and southwest flatlands). Frozen water, in the form of glacier ice, covers some 16,000 square miles (41,000 km^{2}) of land and 1,200 square miles (3,100 km^{2}) of tidal zone. The Bering Glacier complex near the southeastern border with Yukon, Canada, covers 2,250 square miles (5,800 km^{2}) alone.

With its numerous islands, Alaska has nearly 34,000 miles (55,000 km) of tidal shoreline. The island chain extending west from the southern tip of the Alaska Peninsula is called the Aleutian Islands. Many active volcanoes are found in the Aleutians. For example, Unimak Island is home to Mount Shishaldin, a moderately active volcano that rises to 9,980 feet (3,042 m) above sea level. The chain of volcanoes extends to Mount Spurr, west of Anchorage on the mainland.

One of North America's largest tides occurs in Turnagain Arm just south of Anchorage. Tidal differences can be more than 35 feet (10.7 m). (Many sources say Turnagain has the second-greatest tides in North America, but it has since been shown that several areas in Canada have larger tides, according to an Anchorage Daily News article dated 6/23/03.)

=== Gallery ===
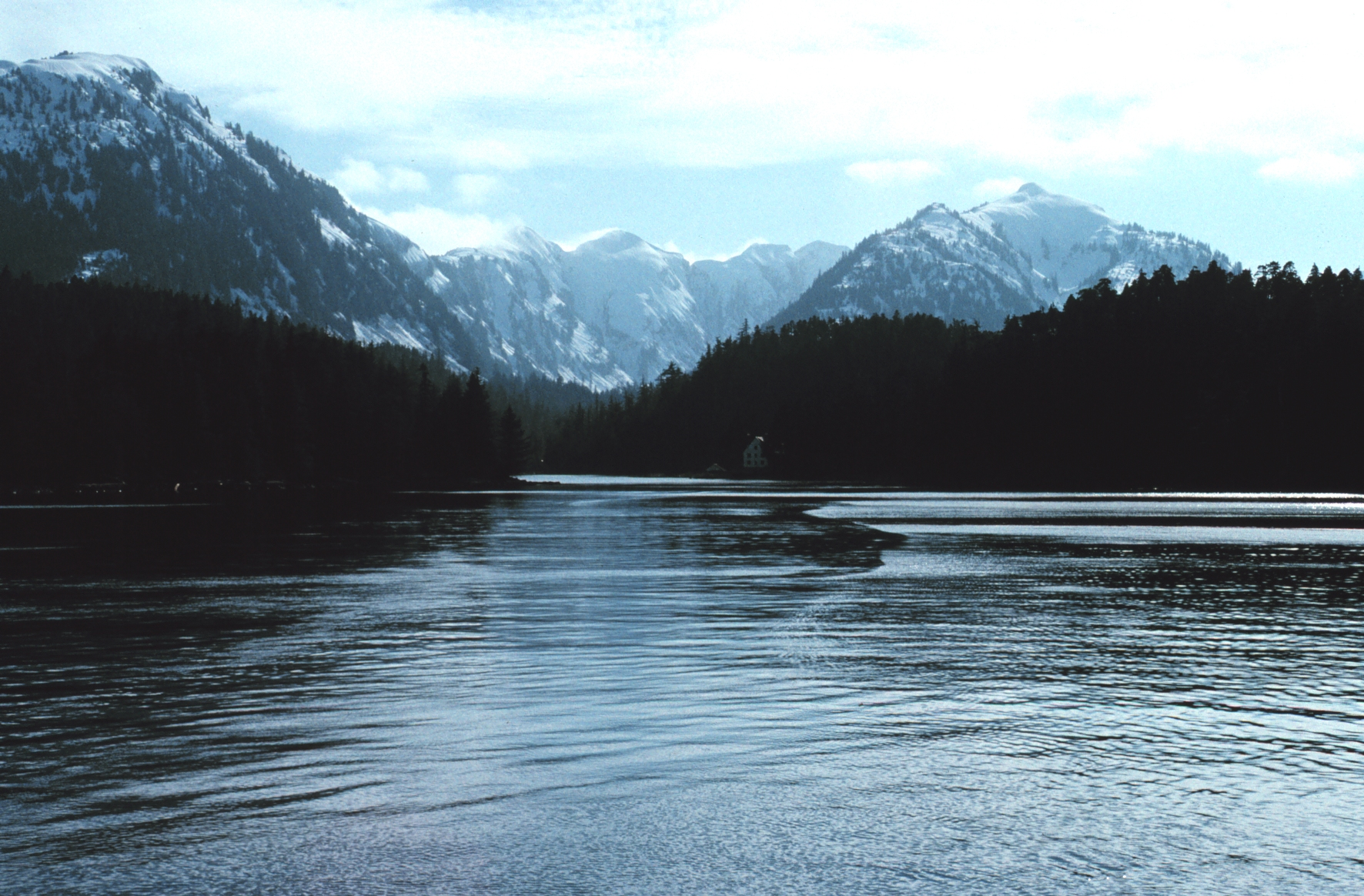
Near Little Port Walter in Southeast Alaska

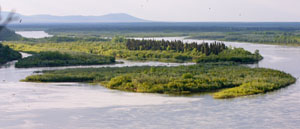
Nushagak River in Southwest Alaska

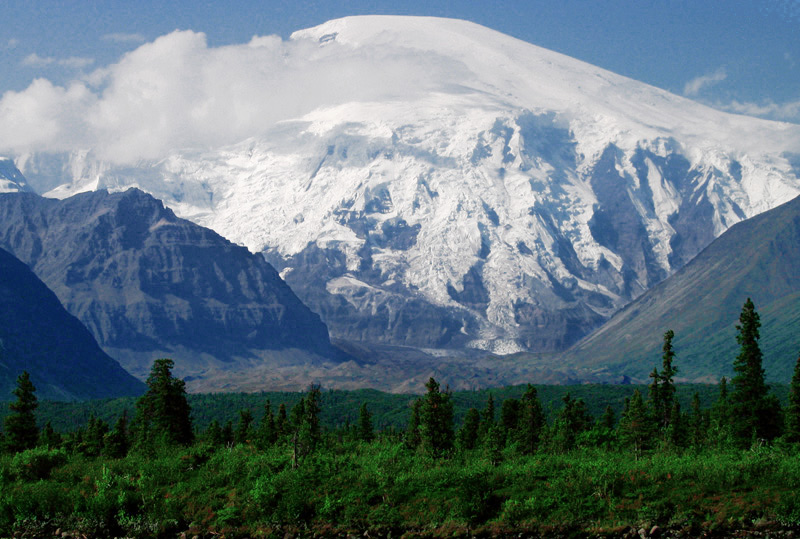
Mount Sanford in the Wrangell Mountains

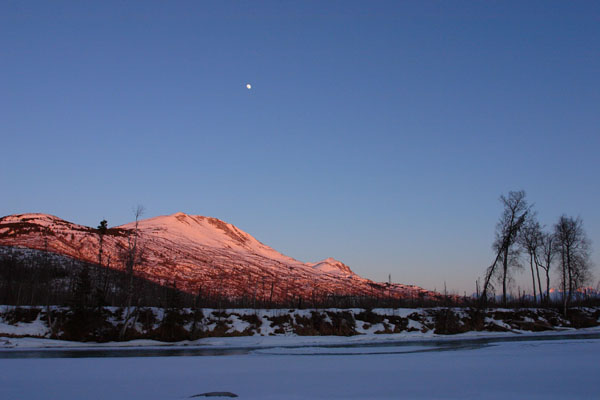
Kenai River on the Kenai Peninsula

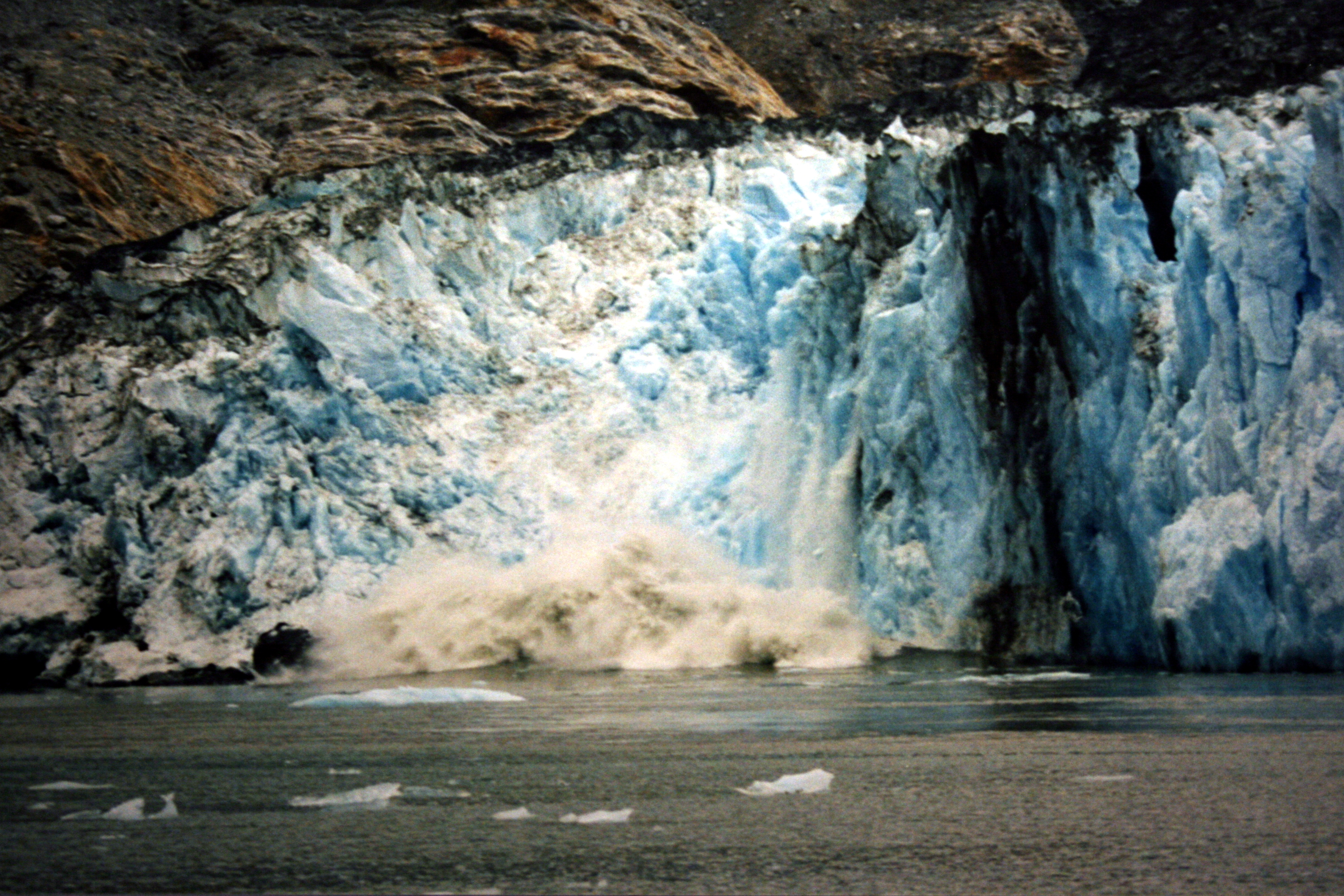
Calving glacier

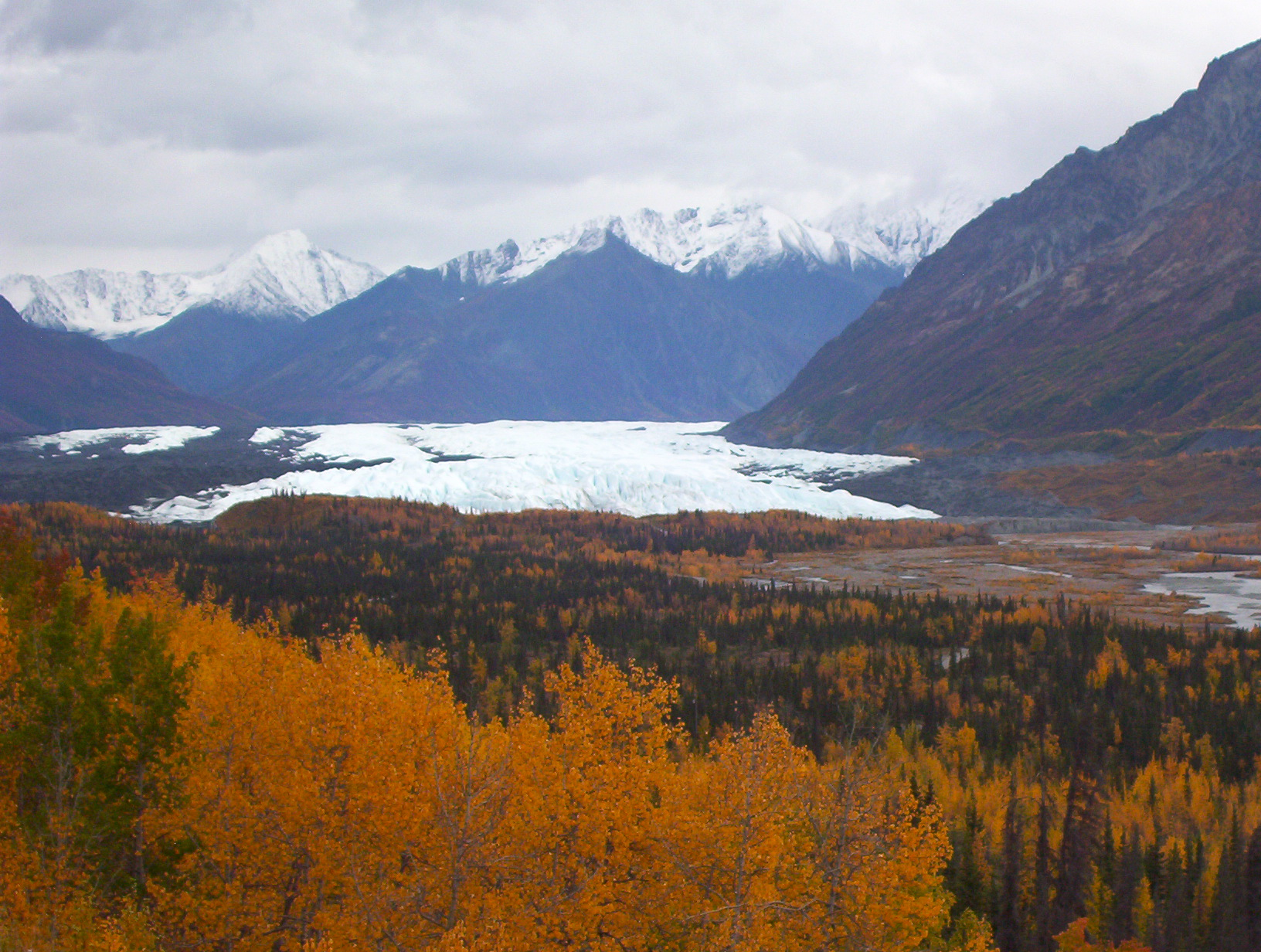
Matanuska Glacier

== Climate ==
The climate in south and southeastern Alaska is a mid-latitude oceanic climate (Köppen climate classification: Cfb), and a subarctic oceanic climate (Köppen Cfc) in the northern parts. On an annual basis, the southeast is both the wettest and warmest part of Alaska with milder temperatures in the winter and high precipitation throughout the year. Juneau averages over 50 in (130 cm) of precipitation a year, and Ketchikan averages over 150 in (380 cm). This is also the only region in Alaska in which the average daytime high temperature is above freezing during the winter months.

Köppen climate types of Alaska

The climate of Anchorage and south central Alaska is mild by Alaskan standards due to the region's proximity to the seacoast. While the area gets less rain than southeast Alaska, it gets more snow, and days tend to be clearer. On average, Anchorage receives 16 in (41 cm) of precipitation a year, with around 75 in (190 cm) of snow, although there are areas in the south central which receive far more snow. It is a subarctic climate (Köppen: Dfc) due to its brief, cool summers.

The climate of western Alaska is determined in large part by the Bering Sea and the Gulf of Alaska. It is a subarctic oceanic climate in the southwest and a continental subarctic climate farther north. The temperature is somewhat moderate considering how far north the area is. This region has a tremendous amount of variety in precipitation. An area stretching from the northern side of the Seward Peninsula to the Kobuk River valley (i.e., the region around Kotzebue Sound) is technically a desert, with portions receiving less than 10 in (25 cm) of precipitation annually. On the other extreme, some locations between Dillingham and Bethel average around 100 in (250 cm) of precipitation.

The climate of the interior of Alaska is subarctic. Some of the highest and lowest temperatures in Alaska occur around the area near Fairbanks. The summers may have temperatures reaching into the 90s °F (the low-to-mid 30s °C), while in the winter, the temperature can fall below −60 °F (−51 °C). Precipitation is sparse in the Interior, often less than 10 in (25 cm) a year, but what precipitation falls in the winter tends to stay the entire winter.

The highest and lowest recorded temperatures in Alaska are both in the Interior. The highest is 100 °F (38 °C) in Fort Yukon (which is just 8 mi or 13 km inside the arctic circle) on June 27, 1915, making Alaska tied with Hawaii as the state with the lowest high temperature in the United States. The lowest official Alaska temperature is −80 °F (−62 °C) in Prospect Creek on January 23, 1971, one degree above the lowest temperature recorded in continental North America (in Snag, Yukon, Canada).

The climate in the extreme north of Alaska is Arctic (Köppen: ET) with long, very cold winters and short, cool summers. Even in July, the average low temperature in Utqiaġvik is 34 °F (1 °C). Precipitation is light in this part of Alaska, with many places averaging less than 10 in (25 cm) per year, mostly as snow which stays on the ground almost the entire year.

=== Climate data ===
Average daily maximum and minimum temperatures for selected locations in Alaska
Location	July (°F)	July (°C)	January (°F)	January (°C)
Anchorage	65/51	18/10	22/11	−5/−11
Juneau	64/50	17/11	32/23	0/−4
Ketchikan	64/51	17/11	38/28	3/−1
Unalaska	57/46	14/8	36/28	2/−2
Fairbanks	72/53	22/11	1/−17	−17/−27
Fort Yukon	73/51	23/10	−11/−27	−23/−33
Nome	58/46	14/8	13/−2	−10/−19
Utqiaġvik	47/34	08/1	−7/−19	−21/−28

== Land management ==
Alaska has more acreage of public land owned by the federal government than any other state.

According to an October 1998 report by the United States Bureau of Land Management, approximately 65% of Alaska is owned and managed by the U.S. federal government as national forests, national parks, and national wildlife refuges. Of these, the Bureau of Land Management manages 87 million acres (35 million hectares), or 23.8% of the state. The Arctic National Wildlife Refuge is managed by the United States Fish and Wildlife Service.

Of the remaining land area, the State of Alaska owns 24.5%; another 10% is managed by thirteen regional and dozens of local Native corporations created under the Alaska Native Claims Settlement Act. Various private interests own the remaining land, totaling less than 1%.

Alaska is administratively divided into "boroughs," as opposed to "counties." The function is the same, but whereas some states use a three-tiered system of decentralization — state/county/township — most of Alaska only uses two tiers — state/borough. Owing to the state's low population density, most of the land is located in the Unorganized Borough which, as the name implies, has no intermediate borough government of its own, but is administered directly by the state government. As of the 2000 census, 57.71 percent of Alaska's land area has this status; however, its population comprises only 13.05 percent of the state's total.

For statistical purposes the United States Census Bureau divides this territory into census areas. Anchorage merged the city government with the Greater Anchorage Area Borough in 1971 to form the Municipality of Anchorage, containing the city proper, and the bedroom communities of Eagle River, Chugiak, Peters Creek, Girdwood, Bird Creek, and Indian. Fairbanks, on the other hand, has a separate borough (the Fairbanks North Star Borough) and municipality (the City of Fairbanks).

== See also ==
- Alaska census statistical areas
- Alaska Peninsula
- Bristol Bay
- List of boroughs and census areas in Alaska
- List of islands of Alaska
- List of mountain peaks of Alaska
  - Most prominent summits of Alaska
- List of rivers of Alaska
- List of areas disputed by Canada and the United States
- Climate change in Alaska
