= Snake River (Nushagak Bay) =

- Location of the mouth of the Snake River River in Alaska

Location
- Country: United States
- State: Alaska
- Census Area: Dillingham

Physical characteristics
- Source
  - coordinates: 59°02′52″N 159°16′11″W
- Mouth: Nushagak Bay
  - location: 15 miles (24 km) southwest of Dillingham
  - coordinates: 59°09′03″N 158°53′20″W
  - elevation: 0 ft (0 m)

Snake River is a river in southwest Alaska, USA. It forms the outflow of Lake Nunavaugaluk and flows initially in southeastern, later in a predominantly southern direction, where it has a strong meandering behavior with numerous river loops and oxbow lakes. 15 km above the mouth of the Weary River meets the right side of the Snake River. This finally flows 25 km southwest of Dillingham in the Nushagak Bay. Further west flows the Igushik River, and further east the Nushagak River flows into the bay. The river system is used by a smaller population of sockeye salmon (Oncorhynchus nerka) for spawning in summer. The mean discharge at the outflow from Lake Nunavaugaluk is 15.4 m³/s. The highest discharges occur in May and June during the snowmelt.

== See also ==
- List of rivers of Alaska
