= HD 17156 =

Star in the constellation Cassiopeia

HD 17156 / Nushagak
Observation data Epoch J2000 Equinox ICRS
- Constellation: Cassiopeia
- Right ascension: 02^{h} 49^{m} 44.48710^{s}
- Declination: +71° 45′ 11.6292″
- Apparent magnitude (V): 8.16

Characteristics
- Evolutionary stage: main sequence
- Spectral type: F9V

Astrometry
Radial velocity (R_{v})	−3.29±0.13 km/s
Proper motion (μ)	RA: +90.848 mas/yr Dec.: −33.013 mas/yr
Parallax (π)	12.9142±0.0177 mas
Distance	252.6 ± 0.3 ly (77.4 ± 0.1 pc)
Absolute magnitude (M_{V})	3.80

Details
Mass	1.275±0.018 M_{☉}
Radius	1.5007±0.0076 R_{☉}
Luminosity	2.76+0.19 −0.13 L_{☉}
Surface gravity (log g)	4.184±0.024 cgs
Temperature	6,046+76 −72 K
Metallicity [Fe/H]	+0.208±0.058 dex
Rotation	~12.8 d
Rotational velocity (v sin i)	2.8±0.5 km/s
Age	3.37+0.20 −0.47 Gyr

Other designations
- Nushagak, AG+71 95, BD+71 171, HD 17156, HIP 13192, SAO 4737, PPM 5099, TOI-1573, TIC 302773669, TYC 4321-1320-1, GSC 04321-01320

Database references
SIMBAD	data
Exoplanet Archive	data

HD 17156, named Nushagak by the IAU, is a yellow subgiant star approximately 253 light-years away in the constellation of Cassiopeia. The apparent magnitude is 8.16, which means it is not visible to the naked eye but can be seen with good binoculars. It hosts one known exoplanet, HD 17156 b. A search for a binary companion star using adaptive optics at the MMT Observatory was negative.

== Nomenclature ==
The designation HD 17156 comes from the Henry Draper Catalogue.

This was one of the systems selected to be named in the 2019 NameExoWorlds campaign during the 100th anniversary of the IAU, which assigned each country a star and planet to be named. This system was assigned to the United States. The star was given the name Nushagak, with the comment that "Nushagak is a regional river near Dillingham, Alaska, which is famous for its wild salmon that sustain local Indigenous communities." The planet HD 17156 b was given the name Mulchatna, after a tributary of the Nushagak river.

== Stellar properties ==
The star is more massive and larger than the Sun, while its absolute magnitude of 3.70 and spectral type of G0 show that it is both hotter and more luminous. Based on asteroseismic density constraints and stellar isochrones, it was found that the age is 3.37 ^{+0.20}_{−0.47} billion years making it about two thirds as old as the Sun. Spectral observations show that the star is metal-rich.

== Planetary system ==
An exoplanet, HD 17156 b (later named Mulchatna), was discovered with the radial velocity method in 2007, and subsequently was observed to transit the star. At the time it was the transiting planet with the longest period. It is a gas giant more massive than Jupiter with a close-in, eccentric orbit. HD 17156 is the first star in Cassiopeia around which an orbiting planet was discovered.

Observations have ruled out the presence of any additional Jupiter-mass planets within 10 AU of the star.

The HD 17156 planetary system
Companion (in order from star)	Mass	Semimajor axis (AU)	Orbital period (days)	Eccentricity	Inclination (°)	Radius
b / Mulchatna	3.26±0.11 M_{J}	0.1632±0.0027	21.2164294(61)	0.6772+0.0045 −0.0044	86.51+0.37 −0.34	1.094+0.031 −0.030 R_{J}

== See also ==
- List of stars with extrasolar planets
