= Ekwok Airport =

Airport in Alaska, United States

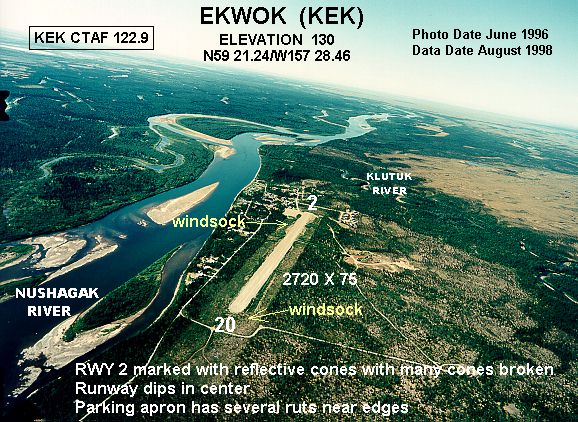
- View from north, prior to extension of runway
- IATA: KEK; ICAO: PAAV; FAA LID: KEK

Summary
- Airport type: Public
- Owner: State of Alaska DOT&PF - Central Region
- Serves: Ekwok, Alaska
- Elevation AMSL: 135 ft (41 m)
- Coordinates: 59°21′17″N 157°28′20″W

Map
- Location of airport in Alaska

Runways
| Direction | Length | | Surface |
| Direction | ft | m | Surface |
|---|---|---|---|
| 2/20 | 3,319 | 1,012 | Gravel |

Statistics (2016)
- Aircraft operations (2013): 2,200
- Based Aircraft (2017): 0
- Passengers: 640
- Freight: 152,000 lbs
- Source: Federal Aviation Administration; Source: Bureau of Transportation

Ekwok Airport (IATA: KEK, ICAO: PAAV, FAA LID: KEK) is a state-owned public-use airport serving Ekwok, a city in the Dillingham Census Area of the U.S. state of Alaska. Scheduled airline service to Merrill Field in Anchorage, AK is provided by Dena'ina air.

As per Federal Aviation Administration records, the airport had 283 passenger boardings (enplanements) in calendar year 2008, 182 enplanements in 2009, and 284 in 2010. It is included in the National Plan of Integrated Airport Systems for 2011–2015, which categorized it as a general aviation airport (the commercial service category requires at least 2,500 enplanements per year).

== Facilities and aircraft ==
Ekwok Airport covers an area of 118 acres (48 ha) at an elevation of 135 feet (41 m) above mean sea level. It has one runway designated 2/20 with a gravel surface measuring 3,300 by 75 feet (1,006 x 23 m). The runway rebuilt and lengthened in 2005 prior to which its length was 2,720 feet (829 m).

For the 12-month period ending December 31, 2008, the airport had 2,200 aircraft operations, an average of 183 per month: 68% air taxi and 32% general aviation.

== Airlines and destinations ==
| Airlines | Destinations |
|---|---|
| Grant Aviation | Dillingham, Koliganek, Manokotak, New Stuyahok |

Dena'ina Air Taxi offers service from Ekwok to Anchorage or milk run flights through neighboring village flights to Anchorage.

Top domestic destinations: January – December 2016
| Rank | City | Airport | Passengers |
|---|---|---|---|
| 1 | (Alaska) Dillingham, AK | Dillingham Airport | 280 |
| 2 | (Alaska) New Stuyahok, AK | New Stuyahok Airport | 20 |
| | (Alaska) Koliganek, AK | Koliganek Airport | 20 |

== See also ==
- List of airports in Alaska
