= Mulchatna =

Mulchatna may refer to:

- Mulchatna River, in Alaska
- Mulchatna (planet), named after the river
