= University of Alaska System =

Public university system in Alaska, United States

- Motto: Ad Summum
- Motto in English: "To the top"
- Type: Public university system
- Established: 1917; 109 years ago
- Endowment: $375 million (system-wide) (2021)
- President: Matthew "Matt" Cooper
- Students: 26,341 (2019)
- Location: Anchorage, Fairbanks, and Juneau, Alaska, United States
- Website: www.alaska.edu

University of Alaska locations

The University of Alaska System is a system of public universities in the U.S. state of Alaska. It was created in 1917 and comprises three separately accredited universities on 19 campuses. The system serves nearly 30,000 full- and part-time students and offers 400 unique degree programs.

The university hired its first African-American faculty member in 1965: Robert London Smith, a professor of political science.

Each of the three main universities has several satellite campuses in smaller communities. UAA also operates three large satellite community colleges. The three major institutions in the University of Alaska system are:

- University of Alaska Anchorage, the largest university by enrollment in the system;
- University of Alaska Fairbanks, the first university and flagship;
- University of Alaska Southeast, located in the capital city of Juneau, with campuses in Sitka and Ketchikan and the smallest by enrollment.

Since the population of Alaska is smaller than that of most U.S. states, the University of Alaska System is also relatively small. However, it does have several notable academic departments. At UAF, these are the geology department, the atmospheric sciences department, and the wildlife biology department. Reflecting the state's small population, the amount of federal land granted to the University of Alaska under the Morrill Act was the second-smallest grant in the country.

== Governance ==
The University of Alaska is formally established under Article VII of the Alaska State Constitution. Article VII also establishes a board of regents, appointed by the state's governor and confirmed by the state's legislature, that is tasked with governing the university. All regents serve eight-year terms, except for the student regent, who is nominated by the three main campuses for a two-year term. The board selects a university president who oversees the statewide administration. Under the president, responsibility for the three main universities is assigned to their respective chancellors. There is also the Coalition of Student Leaders, a group of representatives from the UA student governments that advocates for student issues.

== University of Alaska Anchorage ==
The University of Alaska Anchorage (UAA) is the largest university in the state, with approximately 15,000 full- and part-time students across all of its campuses. Roughly two thirds of University of Alaska students attend UAA. There are twelve colleges within UAA, four of which are community campuses in Valdez, Kenai Peninsula (Soldotna and Homer), Kodiak, and the Mat-Su. UAA has thirteen different sports through the NCAA, mainly competing in the Great Northwest Athletic Conference as an NCAA Division II member and competes nationally as the Seawolves. The Carnegie Foundation has classified the institution as a community-engaged campus with high enrollments in undergraduate programs, and a balance among arts, sciences, and professional preparation. Alaska's only medical school or WWAMI program is also administered through the Anchorage campus. The campus is also home to the only FAA-approved collegiate flight training program in the state.

== University of Alaska Fairbanks ==
The University of Alaska Fairbanks (UAF) was known officially as the University of Alaska from 1925 to 1975. UAF is home to the noted Geophysical Institute, which operates the Poker Flat Research Range, a collegiate rocket test range. Until 2015, there was also the Arctic Region Supercomputing Center, the location of the only Cray supercomputer in the Arctic region. There is also the School of Fisheries and Ocean Sciences, which has facilities and research projects all over Alaska and the Arctic Ocean. It is the first university founded in Alaska and is the flagship institution of the University of Alaska system. Their athletic program is also a member of the Great Northwest Athletic Conference as a member of NCAA Division II.

The University of Alaska Fairbanks also has five satellite campuses in Fairbanks: the Bristol Bay Campus in Dillingham, the Chukchi Campus in Kotzebue, the Interior Alaska Campus (based in Fairbanks but serving rural communities across Interior Alaska), the Kuskokwim Campus in Bethel, and the Northwest Campus in Nome. The Kuskokwim Campus also operates a remote learning center in Hooper Bay.

== University of Alaska Southeast ==
The University of Alaska Southeast (UAS) is located in the state's capital, Juneau, and is the smallest system. Although it has campuses in Juneau, Sitka, and Ketchikan, the Juneau campus is the largest of the three. UAS focuses on a strong liberal arts education and experiential learning. There are four academic schools at UAS: the School of Arts & Sciences, the School of Management, the School of Career Education, and the School of Education. As of 2017, the Board of Regents of Alaska has appointed UAS as the University of Alaska's center for the College of Education.
