= HD 17156 b =

Extrasolar planet in the constellation of Cassiopeia

HD 17156 b / Mulchatna
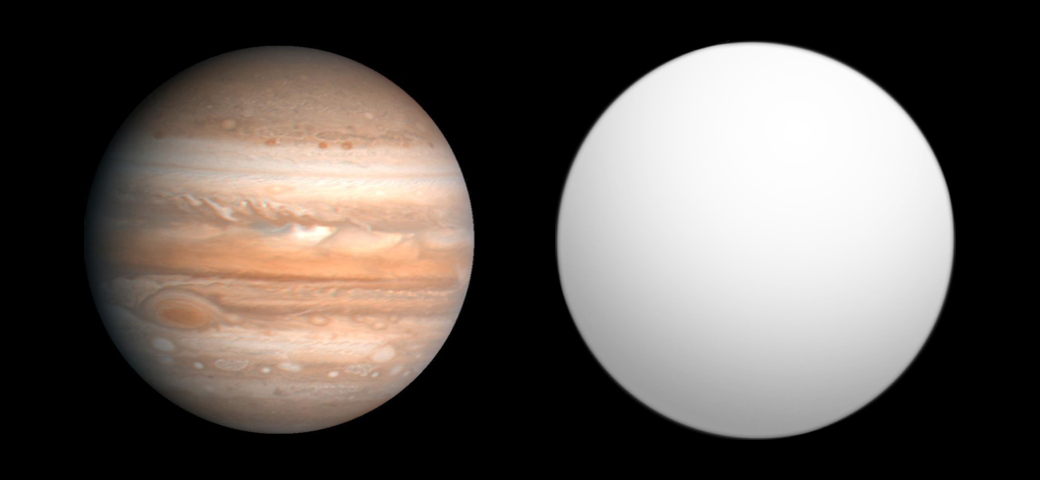
- Size comparison of HD 17156 b with Jupiter.

Discovery
- Discovered by: Fischer et al.
- Discovery site: W. M. Keck Observatory; Subaru Telescope
- Discovery date: 14 April 2007
- Detection method: Radial velocity and Transit

Orbital characteristics
- Semi-major axis: 0.1589 AU (23,770,000 km)
- Eccentricity: 0.6768 ± 0.0034
- Orbital period (sidereal): 21.2163979 ± 0.0000159 d
- Inclination: 86.573 ± 0.060
- Time of periastron: 2454438.4835±0.0025
- Argument of periastron: 121.71 ± 0.43
- Semi-amplitude: 274.2 ± 2.0
- Star: HD 17156

Physical characteristics
- Mean radius: 1.0870 ± 0.0066 R_{J}
- Mass: 3.191 ± 0.033 M_{J}
- Mean density: 3.47 g/cm^{3}
- Surface gravity: 67.0 ± 2.4 m/s^{2} (219.8 ± 7.9 ft/s^{2})
- Temperature: ?

HD 17156 b, named Mulchatna by the IAU, is an extrasolar planet approximately 255 light-years away in the constellation of Cassiopeia. The planet was discovered orbiting the yellow subgiant star HD 17156 in April 2007. The planet is classified as a relatively cool hot Jupiter planet slightly smaller than Jupiter but slightly larger than Saturn. This highly-eccentric three-week orbit takes it approximately 0.0523 AU of the star at periastron before swinging out to approximately 0.2665 AU at apastron. Its eccentricity is about the same as 16 Cygni Bb, a so-called "eccentric Jupiter". Until 2009, HD 17156 b was the transiting planet with the longest orbital period.

== Discovery ==
The planet was discovered on April 14, 2007, by a team using the radial velocity method on the Keck and Subaru telescopes. The team made an initial negative, transit search, but they were only able to cover 25% of the search space. This left the possibility of a transit open.

After the possibility of a transit was discussed on oklo.org, various groups performed a follow-on search. These searches confirmed a three-hour transit on October 2, 2007, and a paper was published two days later.

== Name ==
The planet was originally named "HD 17156 b", being the second object in the HD 17156 system.

The planet was given the name "Mulchatna" by the IAU, chosen by United States representatives for the NameExoWorlds content, with the comment that "The Mulchatna River is a tributary of the Nushagak River in southwestern Alaska, USA". Its parent star was simultaneously named Nushagak in the contest.

== Orbit ==
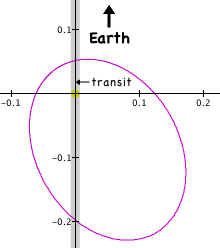
To-scale diagram of the planet's orbit. The gray line indicates the transit window.

Careful radial velocity measurements have made it possible to detect the Rossiter–McLaughlin effect, the shifting in photospheric spectral lines caused by the planet occulting a part of the rotating stellar surface. This effect allows the measurement of the angle between the planet's orbital plane and the equatorial plane of the star. This planet's spin-orbit angle was initially measured by Narita in 2007 as +62 ± 25 but has been remeasured by Cochran +9.4 ± 9.3 degrees. The study in 2012, refined the misalignemt angle to 10±5.1°.

Due to its high eccentricity and large distance from its star, HD 17156 b has a low probability of ever entering a secondary eclipse. The star's true temperature cannot be measured with accuracy. Due to the high eccentricity of its orbit, the atmosphere of HD 17156 b undergoes a 27-fold variation in stellar flux during each orbit.

== See also ==
- 16 Cygni Bb
