= KGK =

KGK can refer to:

- Kaiwá language, Guarani language spoken in Argentina and Brazil
- Koliganek Airport, an airport in Koliganek, Alaska, U.S.
- Kongra-Gel, former name of the Kurdistan Workers' Party
- Korszerűsített Gorjunov-Kucher, Soviet machine gun model
- Kutch Gurjar Kshatriya, a Hindu community in Gujarat, India
