= KDLG (AM) =

Radio station in Dillingham, Alaska

Coordinates: 59°02′40.3″N 158°27′14.9″W

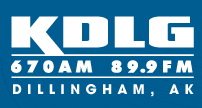
- Dillingham, Alaska; United States
- Broadcast area: Alaska Bush
- Frequencies: 670 kHz (HD Radio)
- Branding: KDLG

Programming
- Format: Variety

Ownership
- Owner: Dillingham City School District

History
- Call sign meaning: K DilLinGham

Technical information
- Licensing authority: FCC
- Class: A
- Power: AM: 10,000 watts
- ERP: FM: 250 watts
- HAAT: 25 meters (82 ft) (FM)
- Repeater: 89.9 MHz (KDLG-FM)

Links
- Public license information: Public file; LMS
- Website: https://www.kdlg.org/

KDLG is a non-commercial, public and community radio station in Dillingham, Alaska, broadcasting on 670 AM. Station programming includes a mix of nationally available NPR shows, Alaska Public Radio Network and local news, and music. It came on the air in 1975. KDLG is a Class A station broadcasting on the clear-channel frequency of 670 kHz.

Like most public broadcasters, the station seeks contributions from listeners via annual fund-drives but, unlike most, does not give those contributors a direct vote on the management or programming of the station. The broadcasting license and management is entirely held by the Dillingham Public School District.

The station features services unique to the community, such as radio programs like Open Line, a call-in show; Bristol Bay Messenger, a messaging service for listeners in remote areas; the Trading Post, an on-air classifieds of items for sale or trade; and Economic Opportunities, which lists job openings by private employers and fishermen — as well as syndicated programs such as the weekly Pink Floyd show "Floydian Slip."

Programming is repeated on co-owned KIGG in Igiugig and KTOG in Togiak, and on KNSA in Unalakleet, a station owned by Unalakleet Broadcasting:

Callsign	Frequency	Community of license	Broadcast Area	Watts	Class
KIGG	103.3 FM	Igiugig, Alaska	Day/Night	90 vertical	D
KTOG	91.9 FM	Togiak, Alaska	Day/Night	90 horizontal	D
KNSA	930 AM (HD Radio)	Unalakleet, Alaska	Daytime; Nighttime	4,200	B
