= KNW =

KNW may refer to:

- KNW, the IATA and FAA LID code for New Stuyahok Airport, an airport in New Stuyahok, Alaska, United States
- KNW, the National Rail code for Kenilworth railway station, Warwickshire, England
- KNW, the Indian Railways station code for Khandwa Junction railway station, Madhya Pradesh, India
