= Nuyakuk River =

- Location of the mouth of the Nuyakuk River in Alaska

Location
- Country: United States
- State: Alaska
- Census Area: Dillingham

Physical characteristics
- Source: Tikchik Lake
  - location: Wood-Tikchik State Park
  - coordinates: 59°56′13″N 158°11′32″W
  - elevation: 316 ft (96 m)
- Mouth: Nushagak River
  - location: 65 miles (105 km) northeast of Dillingham
  - coordinates: 59°48′08″N 157°26′13″W
  - elevation: 177 ft (54 m)
- Length: 36 mi (58 km)

The Nuyakuk River is a 36-mile (58 km) tributary of the Nushagak River in southwestern Alaska, United States. From its source at Tikchik Lake, an extension of Nuyakuk Lake in Wood-Tikchik State Park, it flows eastward into the larger river upstream of Koliganek. The Nuyakuk's mouth is 65 miles (105 km) northeast of Dillingham.

== Recreation ==
Many kinds of watercraft can be used for boating on the Nuyakuk. The Alaska River Guide describes the stream as "an excellent river for families or novices, with experience in portaging...especially those who enjoy fishing." The segments of the Nuyakuk that require portages occur along the upper 7 miles (11 km) of the stream below Tikchik Lake. Two sections of Class II (medium) water on the International Scale of River Difficulty are along this part of the river. Below this, the river plunges over a 0.5-mile (0.8 km) series of ledges in a sequence rated Class IV (very difficult) to V (extremely difficult). Beyond these rapids and ledges, the river is Class I (easy) all the way to the mouth.

Game fish inhabiting the Nuyakuk include rainbow trout, char, Arctic grayling, silver salmon, king salmon, and lake trout. Anglers generally reach the river by floatplane or boat; accommodations include a private lodge along the upper river. There are good campsites except along the lower river near the mouth.

== See also ==
- List of rivers of Alaska
