= Dillingham City School District =

School district in Alaska, United States

Address
- 565 Seward Street Dillingham, Alaska, 99576; United States

District information
- Grades: Pre-K–12
- Superintendent: Chris Aguirre
- Schools: Dillingham Elementary School, Dillingham Middle/High School
- NCES District ID: 0200120

Students and staff
- Students: 403
- Teachers: 35.5
- Staff: 52.5
- Student–teacher ratio: 11.35
- Athletic conference: ASAA Region I

Other information
- Website: www.dlgsd.org

Dillingham City School District is a school district headquartered in Dillingham, Alaska. The district consists of Dillingham Elementary School (Grades Pre-K–5), and Dillingham Middle/High School (Grades 6–12). The district runs KDLG (AM).

== Athletics and Activities ==
The DHS Wolverines compete in the Alaska School Activities Association Region I.
