= The Bush (Alaska) =

Regions in Alaska not connected to major transportation networks

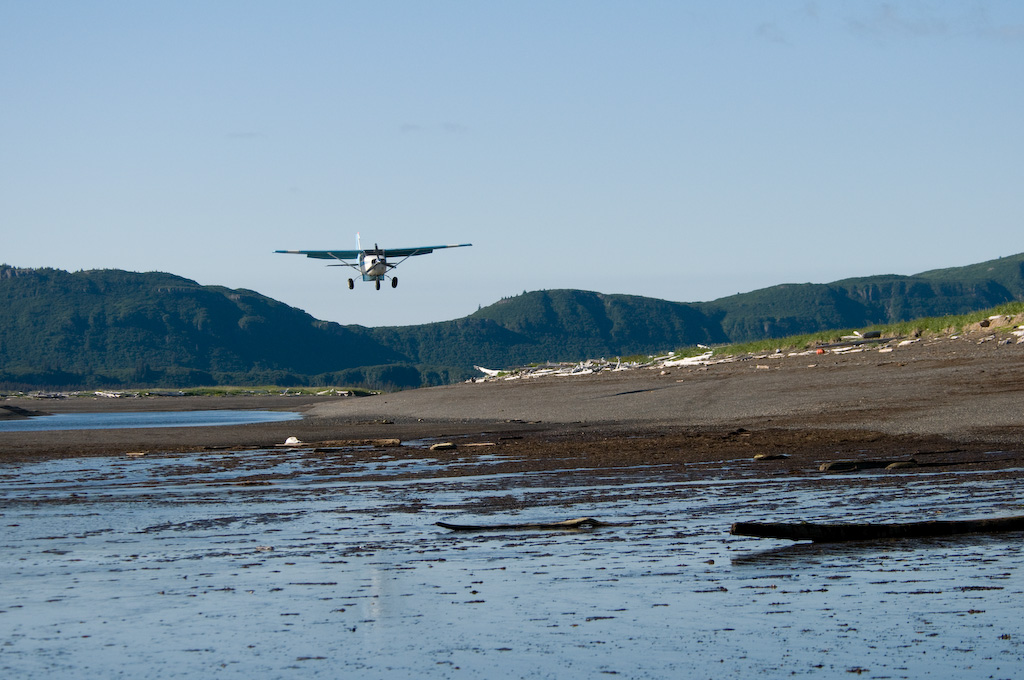
Bush Plane Landing in Katmai National Park Alaska

In Alaska, the Bush typically refers to any region of the state that is not connected to the North American road network and does not have ready access to the state's ferry system. A large proportion of Alaska Native populations live in the Bush, often depending on subsistence hunting and fishing.

Geographically, the Bush comprises the Alaska North Slope; Northwest Arctic; West, including the Baldwin and Seward Peninsulas; the Yukon-Kuskokwim Delta; Southwest Alaska; Bristol Bay; Alaska Peninsula; and remote areas of the Alaska Panhandle and Interior.

Some of the hub communities in the bush, which typically can be reached by larger, commercial airplanes, include Bethel, Dillingham, King Salmon, Nome, Utqiagvik, Kodiak Island, Kotzebue, and Unalaska-Dutch Harbor.

Most parts of Alaska that are off the road or ferry system can be reached by small bush airplanes. Travel between smaller communities or to and from hub communities is typically accomplished by snowmobiles, boats, or ATVs.
