= Wood-Tikchik State Park =

State park in Alaska, United States

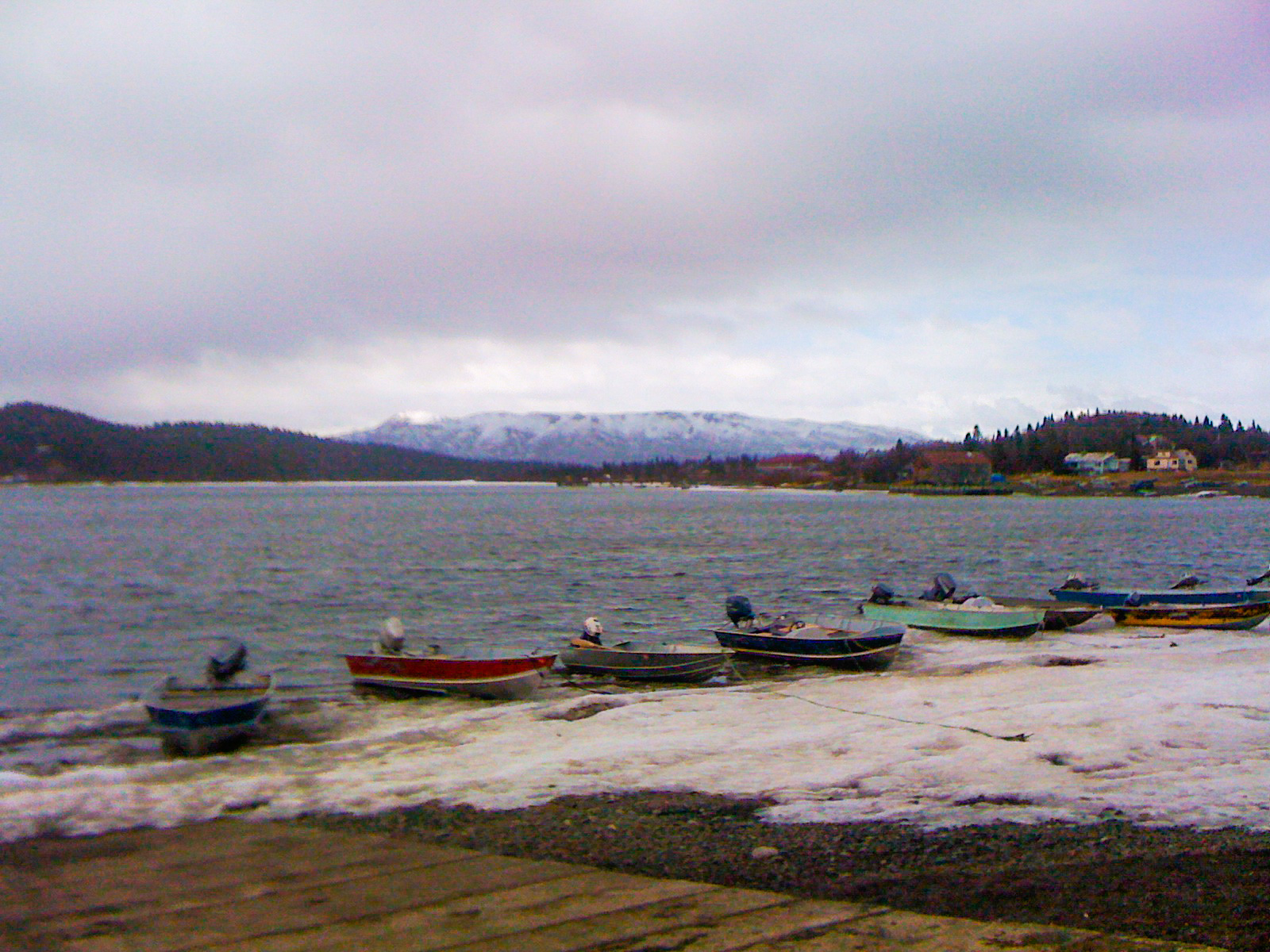
- Interactive map of Wood-Tikchik State Park
- Location: Southwest Alaska
- Nearest city: Dillingham
- Area: 650,000 ha (2,500 sq mi)
- Designation: State Park
- Established: 1978
- Governing body: Alaska Department of Natural Resources
- Owner: State of Alaska

Wood-Tikchik State Park is a state park in the U.S. state of Alaska north of Dillingham. Over 1,600,000 acres (650,000 ha) (6,500 km^{2}) in area—about the size of the state of Delaware—, comprising more than half of all state park land in Alaska and 15% of the total state park land in the country. Despite being the largest state park in the nation, the park had no staff whatsoever for its first five years, and even now at times only a single ranger is in charge of patrolling the entire park, usually by aircraft.

== History ==
Yup'ik people inhabited the area that is now the park for centuries before contact with Europeans. In 1818 a Russian expedition explored the area and its rivers and established a fur trading post in the area that remained active until the Alaska Purchase in 1867. The National Park Service at one point considered managing the area, but the Alaska State Legislature voted in 1978 to make it a state park.

== Access ==
Due to its remote location, the park is not accessible from the contiguous road system. The only road access is from Dillingham, which has an airport with regularly scheduled flights. Many visitors to the park arrive by charted floatplane and land on one of the many lakes, all of which are open to floatplane landings. Marine access to the Wood River lake system is via the Wood River itself. There are a few privately owned remote lodges within the park, by reservation only. The entire park is open to camping, but a few areas do require a permit. Leave No Trace camping is heavily emphasized by the park managers and fires are only permitted on beaches or gravel bars, or one of the few provided fire pits.

== Conservation ==
The park is deliberately mostly undeveloped wilderness, with various conservation groups working to purchase publicly available parcels within the park, either to hold in trust or to sell back to the park system. This has created some friction with pro-development groups, including Yupik natives who would like to develop on land claims they have that predate the establishment of the park. The park is bounded on the west by Togiak National Wildlife Refuge and on the northwest by the Yukon Delta National Wildlife Refuge, providing an extremely large area of remote wilderness on public lands.

== Fish and wildlife ==
The park is considered a critical habitat for a variety of wildlife, however a primary reason for the park’s existence is to preserve salmon spawning areas. All five major salmon species breed in the park, with sockeye considered the most important for subsistence fisheries in the area.

Other wildlife in the park include whitefish, black and brown bears, moose, caribou, wolverines, marmots, porcupines, otters and foxes. Both sport and subsistence hunting of large game is allowed in the park with proper permits.

== Lake and river systems ==
The name of the park refers to two different lake systems within the park. The southern lake system eventually forms the Wood River, which flows into Bristol Bay, and the more northern Tikchik lakes empty into the Nuyakuk River, a tributary of the Nushagak River which also flows into Bristol Bay. The Wood River system of lakes are all directly connected to one another by streams, forming a water trail of over 85 miles (137 km). The lakes of these two systems are large and deep, ranging from 15 to 45 miles (24 to 72 km) long and maximum depths of 342 to 940 feet (104 to 287 m). A dozen of these lakes have over 1,000 acres (400 ha) of surface area. There are rivers connecting the lake systems as long as 60 miles (97 km), all within park boundaries.

== Lake Aleknagik ==
Wood-Tikchik is one of only two state parks in Southwest Alaska. The other is Lake Aleknagik State Recreation Site at 59°16′46″N 158°37′29″W, a small 11-acre (4.5 ha) park whose primary purpose is to serve as a jumping off point for the larger Wood-Tikchik park. It is referred to by locals as "first lake" as it provides access to the various lakes upstream. The site has a boat launch, gas and aviation fuel sales, and ranger headquarters for both state parks.

== See also ==
- List of Alaska state parks
