= King Salmon River (Nushagak River tributary) =

- Location of the mouth of the King Salmon River in Alaska

Location
- Country: United States
- State: Alaska
- Census Area: Dillingham

Physical characteristics
- Source: Kuskokwim Mountains
  - coordinates: 60°17′06″N 158°28′33″W
  - elevation: 1,204 ft (367 m)
- Mouth: Nushagak River
  - location: 100 miles (160 km) southeast of Sleetmute
  - coordinates: 60°15′27″N 157°16′54″W
- Length: 45 mi (72 km)

The King Salmon River is a 45-mile (72 km) tributary of the Nushagak River in southwest Alaska, United States. It flows eastward from headwaters 60°17′06″N 158°28′33″W at a small unnamed lake in the Taylor Mountains to its confluence with the larger river about 220 miles (354 km) north of Nushagak Bay.

There are many rivers in Alaska bearing the name King Salmon River, including tributaries to the Egegik River and Ugashik River systems in southwest Alaska alone. The name is also occasionally confused with that given the Kenai River, a popular fishing stream located in the Cook Inlet drainage of southcentral Alaska.

Besides king salmon, the river is also hosts pink salmon, grayling, burbot, whitefish and Arctic char.

== See also ==
- List of rivers of Alaska
