= Southwest Alaska =

Region of the US state of Alaska

Coordinates: 56.8000°N 162.2333°W

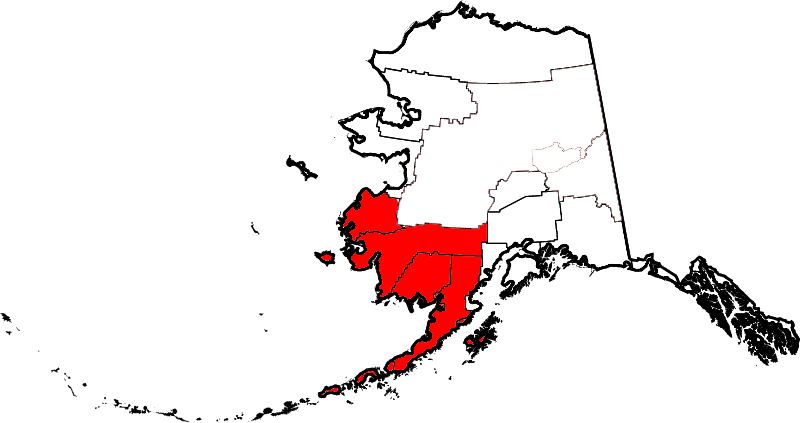
Map highlighting some Census and Governmental units of Southwest Alaska

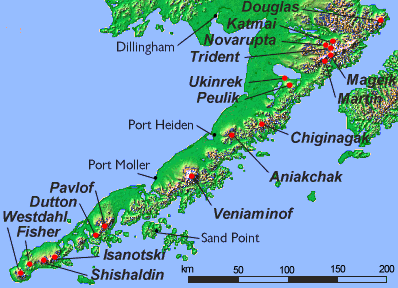
Volcanoes of the Alaska Peninsula

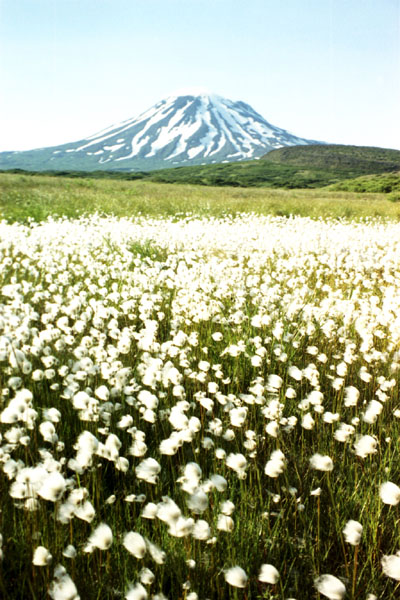
Peulik Volcano

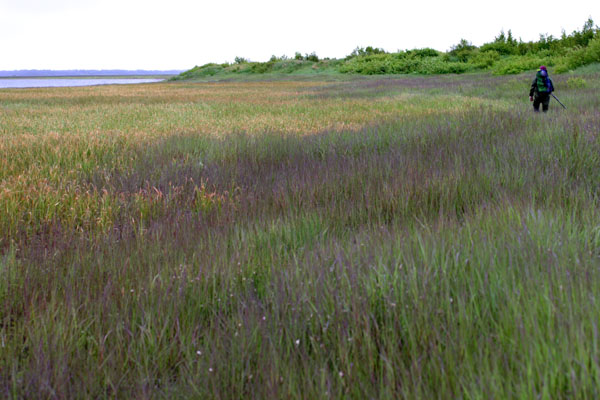
Kvichak River marshes

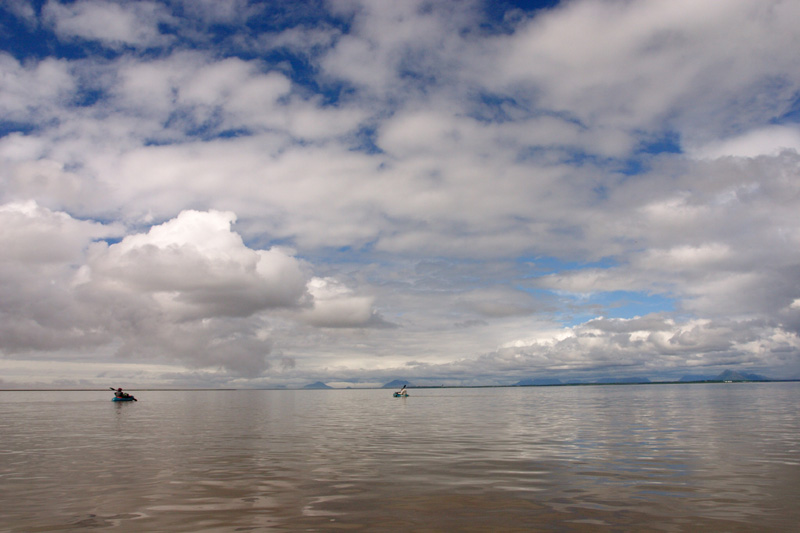
Nushagak Bay

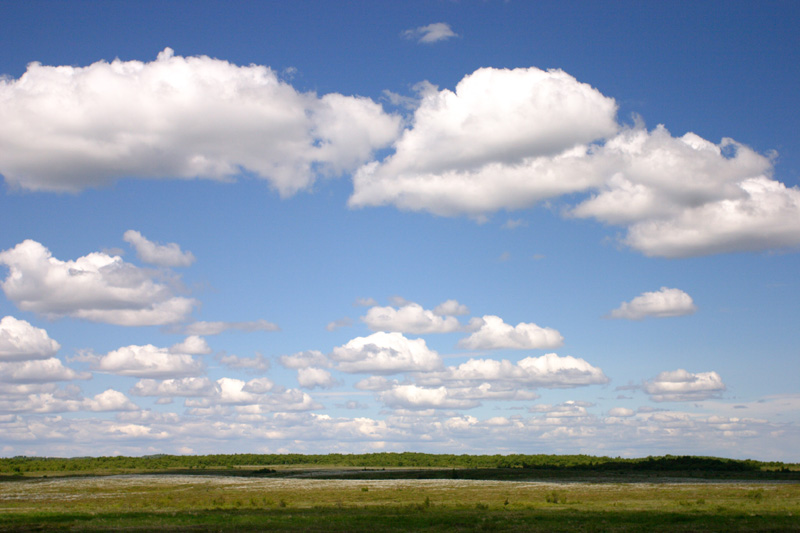
Southwest Alaska tundra

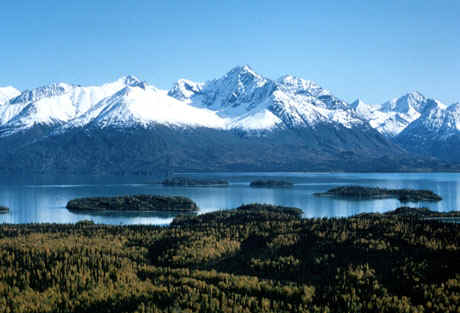
Lake Clark in Southwest Alaska

Southwest Alaska is a region of the U.S. state of Alaska. The area is not exactly defined by any governmental administrative region(s); nor does it always have a clear geographic boundary.

== Geography ==
Southwest Alaska includes a huge swath of terrain 500 miles (800 km) from the western Bering Sea coast to Cook Inlet. Although much of the region is coastal, it also includes tens of thousands of square miles of interior boreal forests, swamps, and highlands, and the immense mountain barrier of the southern Alaska/Aleutian Range. The Aleutian Range, part of the Ring of Fire, includes many of Alaska's volcanoes including Mount Katmai, Novarupta and the Valley of Ten Thousand Smokes, Mount Redoubt, Mount Iliamna, and Augustine Volcano.

Southwest Alaska encompasses, roughly from west to east: the Pribilof Islands, Nunivak Island and other Bering Sea islands lying west of the Alaska coast and east of the Russian coast; the immense combined delta of the Yukon River and Kuskokwim River; hundreds of miles of interior highlands, including the lower and middle Kuskokwim drainages; the entire watersheds of Goodnews Bay and Bristol Bay and other parts of the southern coast, including mountain ranges and great interior lakes including the Wood-Tikchik Lakes, Lake Iliamna, and Lake Clark; the western heights of the Alaska Range, and its continuation southward as the Aleutian Range along the Alaska Peninsula and Aleutian Islands. The Kodiak Archipelago, in the Pacific east of the Alaska Peninsula, is the most eastern part of Southwest Alaska.

Southwest Alaska consists roughly of the Aleutians East, Bristol Bay, Kodiak Island, Lake and Peninsula boroughs, plus the portion of the Kenai Peninsula Borough that lies west of Cook Inlet; along with the Aleutians West, Bethel, Dillingham, and Kusilvak census areas. These areas have a combined area of 170,732 square miles (442,190 km^{2}), slightly larger than California.

== Geology ==
Volcanic eruptions and mountain-building are active along the Ring of Fire, while in far western Alaska lava fields only a few thousand years old are common. In between lie an incomplete record of rocks from as old as 2.07 Ga years to the Holocene. A sequence of continental fragments, seafloor, and island arcs, torn, rafted, and assembled by plate tectonics, form the Proterozoic, Paleozoic and Mesozoic basement for more recent Mesozoic and Cenozoic rocks deposited on top of, and intruded into, them.

== Demographics ==
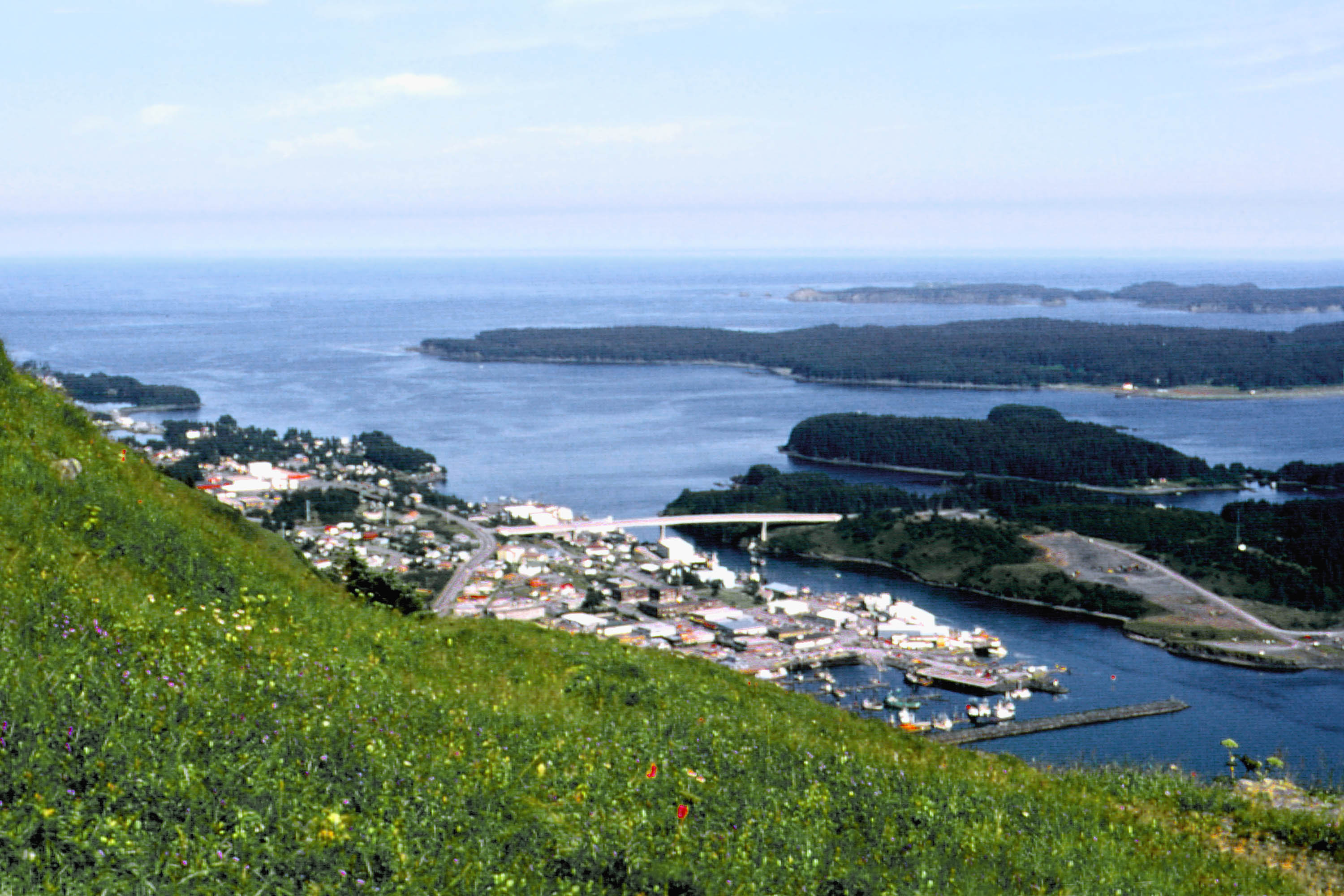
Kodiak

Southwest Alaska had a population of 53,349 as of the 2000 census, less than one-tenth of Alaska's inhabitants. The population is in large part Alaska Native, with 58.1% identifying as entirely or partly "Native American" in the 2000 census. About 121 towns and villages, generally far apart and with populations in the hundreds, exist in the region.

Southwest Alaska can be considered to be the areas assigned to 4 of the 12 land-holding Alaska Native Corporations in 1971 for selection of land and for corporate organization of villages under ANCSA.

The Calista Corporation region is in the Yukon/Kuskokwim delta, the lower and middle reaches of the Kuskokwim River drainage, and the Bering Sea coast from the Yukon to Cape Newenham. It contains 56 villages with a total population of about 23,000 people; Bethel (5,471), is the largest and is the commercial hub for the Kuskokwim region. The Calista region is outlined by the combined Kusilvak and Bethel Census Areas. Calista owns 4,997,263 acres (20,223 km^{2}) of the 41,713,612 acres (168,809 km^{2}) in the region, almost all the rest is owned by the state or federal government.

In the Bristol Bay Native Corporation (BBNC) region Dillingham (2,466), is the largest town. The BBNC region has 29 villages and a total population of about 8000. The Corporation region includes part of the Alaska Peninsula, the Bering Sea coast west to Cape Newenham and the lands draining onto that coast, as well as parts of the Alaska and Aleutian Ranges. The combined areas of the Dillingham Census Area, the Bristol Bay Borough, and the Lake and Peninsula Borough are almost coincident with the BBNC area.

Koniag, Incorporated has a region which covers the Kodiak Archipelago and part of the Alaska Peninsula. Kodiak (6,334) on Kodiak Island is the largest town and the commercial hub of the area. The Corporation region is very similar to, but not exactly the same area as the Kodiak Island Borough, which has a population of about 14,000 people in 11 communities.

Aleut Corporation's lands are on the Aleutian Islands and the western end of the Alaska Peninsula. The Corporation area is exactly the same as the Aleutians East Borough and the Aleutians West Census Area combined. Unalaska/Dutch Harbor (4,283), is the largest town. About 8000 people live in the region, in about a dozen towns, and several military towns.

Natives in Southwest Alaska are mainly Central Yup'ik in the Yukon-Kuskokwim Delta and Bristol Bay areas, Alutiiq on the eastern Alaska Peninsula and Kodiak Island, Aleut in the Aleutians, Pribilofs, and the western Alaska Peninsula, and a few Dena'ina Athabaskans near the western shore of Cook Inlet.

== Economy ==
Land in Southwest Alaska is owned and managed mainly by the federal government, the state of Alaska, and Alaska Native Regional Corporations including Calista, Cook Inlet, Bristol Bay, Aleut, and Koniag. There is little private land, other than that owned by the Native Corporations. The economy rests on resource extraction, subsistence, and government spending.

Fishing, both commercial and recreational, is the mainstay of the economy. Much of the commercial fishing is conducted by non-residents. Kodiak and Unalaska are among the most productive fishing ports in the United States. The salmon, trout, king crab, and halibut fisheries are extremely lucrative. Bristol Bay's commercial sockeye salmon industry is the largest in the world. Approximately 80% of that catch is taken by non-locals. A part of the fishery is processed locally. Only a small share of the value of the harvest is captured in the region, mainly as wages, and taxes and royalties levied by local governments and Native Regional Corporations.

Hunting and other tourism industries are dependable, although small and seasonal, parts of the economy.

Mining, mainly for gold, platinum, and mercury, has been a consistent part of the Southwest Alaska economy since purchase from Russia. Although mining is currently occurring only on a small scale, a controversy rages over a number of proposed resource extraction projects. These include the proposed Pebble Mine, which would put a large open pit gold and copper mine at the headwaters of the Nushagak and Kvichak rivers in the Bristol Bay watershed. Also, the federal government is seeking to lift the moratorium on oil drilling leases in Bristol Bay.

Most of the smaller settlements rely on subsistence activities. Most of the area's residents are shareholders in a Native Corporation.

== Wildlife ==
Southwest Alaska is one of the richest salmon areas in the world, with the world's largest commercial salmon fishery in Bristol Bay. It also has one of the highest concentrations of brown bears, feeding on the salmon, as well as berries and other vegetation. Bear watching is a popular tourist attraction at Katmai National Park and Preserve. This area is also home to a number of caribou herds - the Mulchatna herd is the third largest in the state. The western limit for both caribou and bears is on Unimak Island, first in the Aleutian chain. More western Aleutian Islands have no mammals larger than a fox. In the summer, many species of migratory birds nest on the tundra here, and there are many large seabird rookeries in the Aleutian Islands.

== Transportation ==
Only small local road systems exist in Southwest Alaska. Only a few closely adjacent villages are linked by roads. The area is easily accessible only by air, sea, or river. Alaska Airlines 737 passenger jets serve Bethel, King Salmon, Dillingham, Adak, Dutch Harbor, and Kodiak. Bethel is also a link between arriving ocean barges carrying freight or fuel and the smaller barges which continue up the Kuskokwim. Aniak, Iliamna and some other communities are accessible via scheduled flights from Anchorage on PenAir and smaller air carriers. The small carriers provide essential links onward to smaller communities. Alaska Marine Highway ferries connect Kodiak Archipelago, Alaska Peninsula, and a few Aleutian Island communities to the ports of Southcentral Alaska. A combination of ocean and river barges are important to the communities along the Kuskokwim and Yukon rivers. Snowmachine travel is a critical component of winter transport; an ice road for highway vehicles is used along portions of the Kuskokwim River.

== Rivers ==
- Yukon River
- Anvik River
- Innoko River
- Iditarod River
- Kuskokwim River
- Aniak River
- Holitna River
- Stony River
- Big River
- Swift River
- Kvichak River
- Naknek River
- Newhalen River
- Nushagak River
- Mulchatna River
- King Salmon River

== Lakes ==
- Becharof Lake
- Lake Clark
- Iliamna Lake
- Naknek Lake
- Lake Brooks
- Wood-Tikchik Lakes

== Mountain ranges ==
roughly from west to east

- Nulato Hills
- Kaiyuh Mountains
- Kilbuck Mountains
- Portage Mountains
- Russian Mountains
- Horn Mountains
- Kuskokwim Mountains

including:

  - Sischu Mountains
  - Mystery Mountains
  - Sunshine Mountains
  - Cripple Creek Mountains
  - Beaver Mountains
  - Wood River Mountains
  - Buckstock Mountains
  - Kiokluk Mountains
  - Chuilnik Mountains
- Nushagak Hills
- Alaska Range

including:

  - Revelation Mountains
  - Teocali Mountains
  - Trimokish Hills
  - Terra Cotta Mountains
  - Tordrillo Mountains
  - Neocola Mountasins
- Aleutian Range

including:

  - Chigmit Mountains
  - Walatka Mountains

== Protected areas ==
Southwest Alaska contains numerous state and federal protected areas. These include:

- Alaska Maritime National Wildlife Refuge
- Alaska Peninsula National Wildlife Refuge
- Aniakchak National Monument and Preserve
- Becharof National Wildlife Refuge
- Izembek National Wildlife Refuge
- Katmai National Park and Preserve
- Kodiak National Wildlife Refuge
- Lake Clark National Park and Preserve
- Togiak National Wildlife Refuge
- Wood-Tikchik State Park
- Yukon Delta National Wildlife Refuge
