= Igushik River =

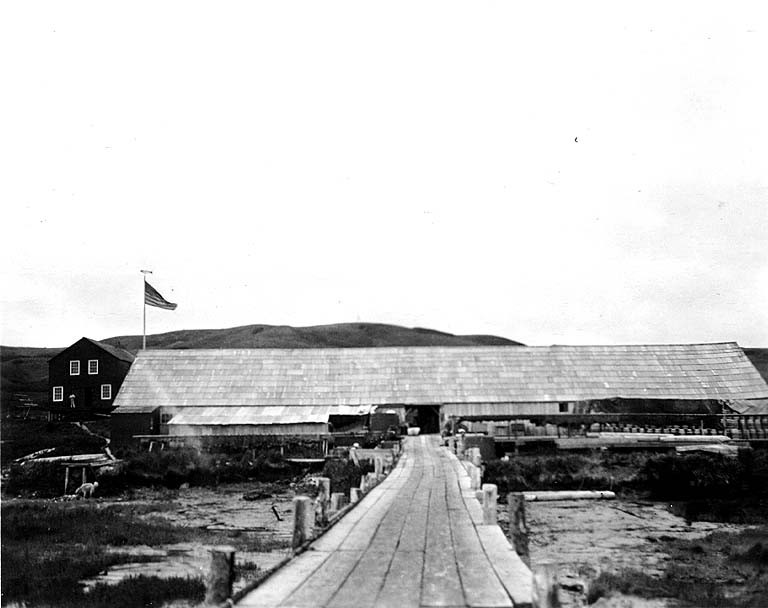
- Alaska Packer's Association saltery on the Igushik River, 1917

- Location of the mouth of the Igushik River in Alaska
- Native name: Iiyuussiiq (Central Yupik)

Location
- Country: United States
- State: Alaska
- Census Area: Dillingham

Physical characteristics
- Source: Amanka Lake
  - location: Togiak National Wildlife Refuge
  - coordinates: 59°02′52″N 159°16′11″W
  - elevation: 133 ft (41 m)
- Mouth: Nushagak Bay
  - location: 26 miles (42 km) southwest of Dillingham
  - coordinates: 58°41′31″N 158°49′12″W
  - elevation: 0 ft (0 m)
- Length: 50 mi (80 km)

The Igushik River (Yup'ik: Iiyuussiiq) is a stream, 50 miles (80 km) long, in the southwestern part of the U.S. state of Alaska. The river flows south from Amanka Lake into the Nushagak Bay arm of Bristol Bay. Except for a small segment in the village of Manokotak, the entire river is part of the Togiak National Wildlife Refuge.

== See also ==
- List of rivers of Alaska
