= UAF Bristol Bay Campus =

College campus in Dillingham, Alaska, USA

Coordinates: 59°02′33″N 158°27′53″W

The UAF Bristol Bay Campus (BBC) is one of several rural campuses administered by the University of Alaska Fairbanks system. The campus is located in Dillingham, Alaska, and serves the many remote communities of Bristol Bay, Alaska Peninsula, Pribilof Islands, and the Aleutian regions of southwest Alaska. There are learning centers in Dillingham, King Salmon, Togiak, New Stuyahok, St. Paul, and Unalaska. BBC focuses on serving Alaska Native and non-traditional students by offering online, audio, and face-to-face learning opportunities.

== History ==
Since 1985, BBC has been serving the 40 remote Bristol Bay villages on the Alaskan mainland which are scattered over a 55,000 square mile area (the size of Ohio). In July 2015, the Campus was asked by the UAF administration to oversee higher education services in the islands of the Aleutian-Pribilof region, which was previously served through the Fairbanks-based Interior-Aleutians Campus (now renamed the UAF Interior Alaska Campus).

== See also ==
- University of Alaska Fairbanks
- Dillingham, Alaska
- Southwest Alaska
- Bristol Bay
