= Koliganek Airport =

Airport in Alaska, United States

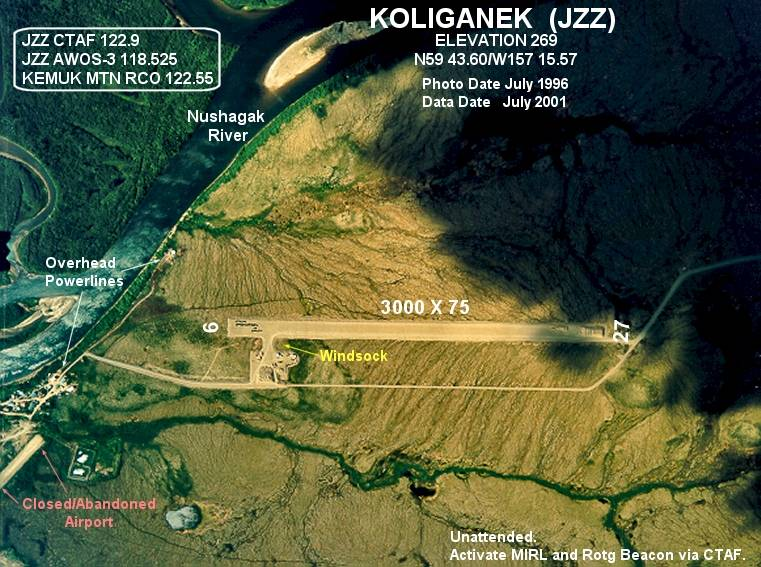
- IATA: KGK; ICAO: PAJZ; FAA LID: JZZ

Summary
- Airport type: Public
- Owner: State of Alaska DOT&PF
- Serves: Koliganek, Alaska
- Elevation AMSL: 269 ft (82 m)
- Coordinates: 59°43′36″N 157°15′34″W

Map
- Location of airport in Alaska

Runways
| Direction | Length | | Surface |
| Direction | ft | m | Surface |
|---|---|---|---|
| 9/27 | 3,000 | 914 | Gravel |

Statistics
- Enplanements (2008): 481
- Source: Federal Aviation Administration

Koliganek Airport (IATA: KGK, ICAO: PAJZ, FAA LID: JZZ) is a state-owned, public-use airport located one nautical mile (1.85 km) east of the central business district of Koliganek, in the Dillingham Census Area of the U.S. state of Alaska. Scheduled airline service to Dillingham Airport is provided by Peninsula Airways (PenAir).

As per Federal Aviation Administration records, this airport had 481 commercial passenger boardings (enplanements) in calendar year 2008, a decrease of 21% from the 606 enplanements in 2007. Koliganek Airport is included in the FAA's National Plan of Integrated Airport Systems (2009–2013), which categorizes it as a general aviation facility.

Although most U.S. airports use the same three-letter location identifier for the FAA and IATA, this airport is assigned JZZ by the FAA and KGK by the IATA.

== Facilities and aircraft ==
This airport opened in 1997, replacing the former airport located at 59°43′28″N 157°17′09″W. The current airport has one runway designated 9/27 with a gravel surface measuring 3,000 by 75 feet (914 × 23 m).

== Airlines and destinations ==
| Airlines | Destinations |
|---|---|
| Grant Aviation | Dillingham, Ekwok, New Stuyahok |

== See also ==
- List of airports in Alaska
