= New Stuyahok Airport =

Airport in Alaska, United States

- IATA: KNW; ICAO: PANW; FAA LID: KNW

Summary
- Airport type: Public
- Owner: Alaska DOT&PF - Central Region
- Serves: New Stuyahok, Alaska
- Elevation AMSL: 364 ft (111 m)
- Coordinates: 59°27′06″N 157°22′23″W

Map
- Location of airport in Alaska

Runways
Direction	Length		Surface
Direction	ft	m	Surface
14/32	3,281	1,000	Gravel

Statistics (2002)
- Aircraft operations: 950
- Enplanements (2008): 781
- Source: Federal Aviation Administration

New Stuyahok Airport (IATA: KNW, ICAO: PANW, FAA LID: KNW) is a state-owned, public-use airport located one nautical mile (1.85 km) west of the central business district of New Stuyahok, a city in the Dillingham Census Area of the U.S. state of Alaska. Scheduled airline service to Dillingham Airport is provided by Peninsula Airways (PenAir).

As per Federal Aviation Administration records, this airport had 781 commercial passenger boardings (enplanements) in calendar year 2008, a decrease of 24% from the 1,031 enplanements in 2007. New Stuyahok Airport is included in the FAA's National Plan of Integrated Airport Systems (2009–2013), which categorizes it as a general aviation facility.

== Facilities and aircraft ==
New Stuyahok Airport has one runway designated 14/32 with a gravel surface measuring 3,281 by 98 feet (1,000 x 30 m). The airport opened at its current location in 2006; previously it was 1 mile (1.6 km) to the east, at 59°26′56″N 157°19′41″W, where it had an 1,800-by-50-foot (549 m × 15 m) runway designated 15/33.

For the 12-month period ending July 31, 2002, the airport had 950 aircraft operations, an average of 79 per month: 74% general aviation and 26% air taxi.

== Airlines and destinations ==
Airlines	Destinations
Grant Aviation	Dillingham, Ekwok, Koliganek

== See also ==
- List of airports in Alaska
