= Mulchatna River =

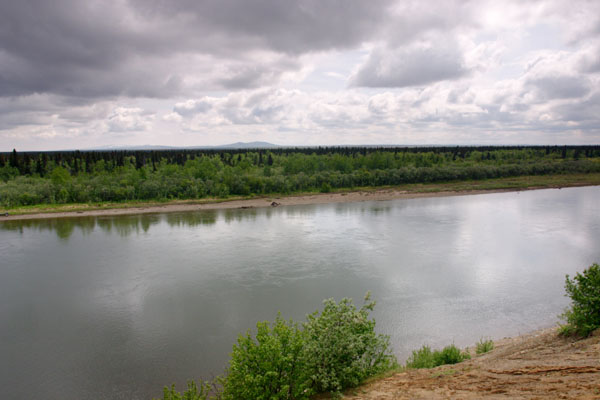
- Mulchatna River

- Location of the mouth of the Mulchatna River in Alaska
- Native name: Vałts'atnaq' (Denaʼina)

Location
- Country: United States
- State: Alaska
- Census Area: Dillingham

Physical characteristics
- Source: Turquoise Lake
  - location: west of the Chigmit Mountains, Lake Clark National Park and Preserve
  - coordinates: 60°46′56″N 154°00′30″W
  - elevation: 2,506 ft (764 m)
- Mouth: Nushagak River
  - location: 65 miles (105 km) northeast of Dillingham
  - coordinates: 59°38′40″N 157°06′55″W
  - elevation: 151 ft (46 m)
- Length: 160 mi (260 km)

National Wild and Scenic River
- Type: Wild
- Designated: December 2, 1980

The Mulchatna River (Dena'ina: Vałts'atnaq') is a 160-mile (260 km) tributary of the Nushagak River in the U.S. state of Alaska. Beginning at Turquoise Lake, it flows generally southwest to meet the larger river 65 miles (105 km) northeast of Dillingham. The Mulchatna's mouth is slightly south (downstream) of the village of Koliganek on the Nushagak, which continues southwest to Nushagak Bay, an arm of Bristol Bay.

The upper 24 miles (39 km) of the river, which flow through Lake Clark National Park and Preserve, became part of the National Wild and Scenic River System in 1980. Aside from scattered cabins, the Mulchatna River is undeveloped. However, there is a proposal to build a large copper/gold mine, the Pebble Mine, in the watershed of one of the Mulchatna tributaries, the Koktuli River.

== Recreation ==
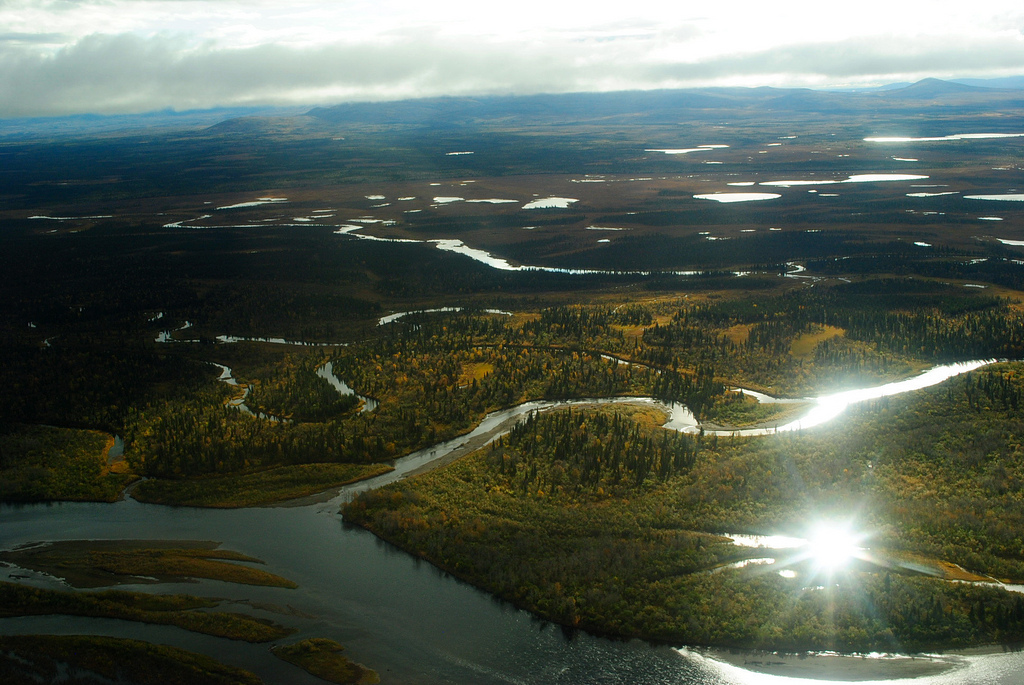
Mulchatna river in 2011

The Mulchatna River and one of its tributaries, the Chilikadrotna River, are popular Southwest Alaska destinations for floatfishing. Other Mulchatna tributaries, including the Stuyahok and Koktuli rivers, are also popular fishing streams. The main game fish frequenting the Mulchatna are king salmon, silver salmon, char, Arctic grayling, and rainbow trout.

Varying from Class I (easy) to III (difficult) on the International Scale of River Difficulty, the Mulchatna is floatable by many kinds of watercraft on the Class I water below Bonanza Creek. The upper 50 miles (80 km) or so of the river, however, vary between Class II (medium) and III, may require portages, and are sometimes too shallow to float. Other dangers include ledge drops and haystack waves above Bonanza Creek and possible logjams and overhanging vegetation along the rest of the river.

== See also ==
- List of rivers of Alaska
