= Koliganek, Alaska =

Koliganek Qalirneq
- Census-designated place
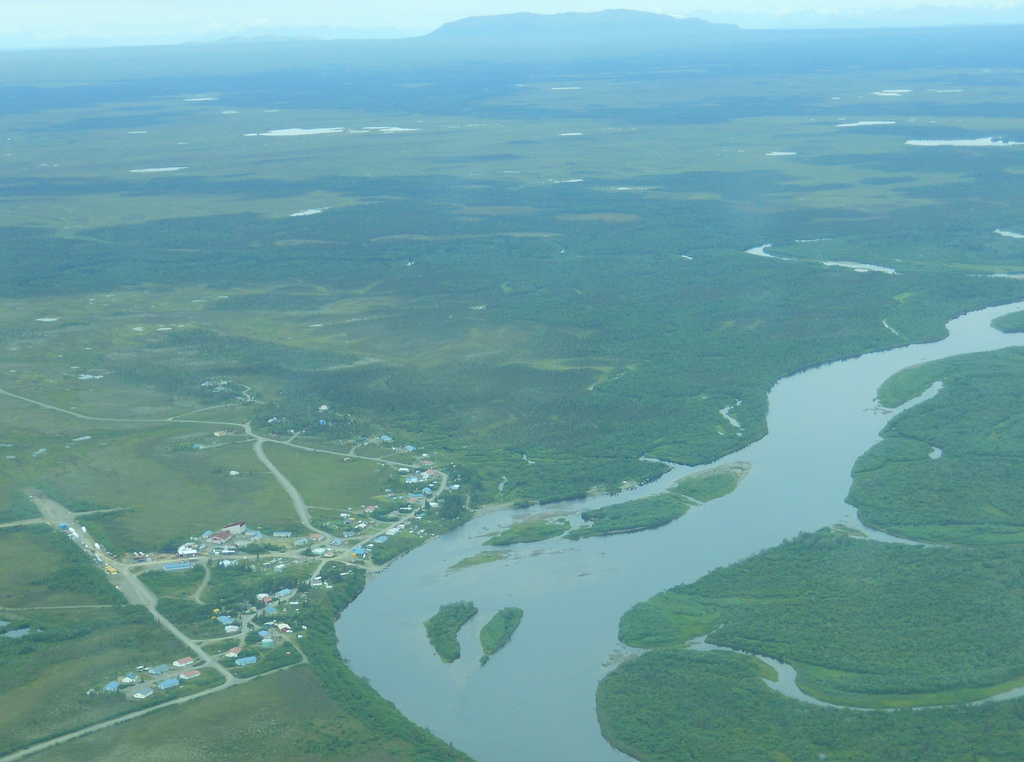
- Aerial view of Koliganek in 2011

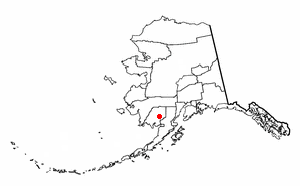
- Location of Koliganek, Alaska
- Coordinates: 59°43′44″N 157°16′38″W
- Country: United States
- State: Alaska
- Census Area: Dillingham

Government
  - State senator: Lyman Hoffman (D)
  - State rep.: Bryce Edgmon (I)

Area
  - Total: 16.74 sq mi (43.35 km^{2})
  - Land: 16.73 sq mi (43.32 km^{2})
  - Water: 0.012 sq mi (0.03 km^{2})
- Elevation: 210 ft (64 m)

Population (2020)
  - Total: 183
  - Density: 10.9/sq mi (4.22/km^{2})
- Time zone: UTC-9 (Alaska (AKST))
  - Summer (DST): UTC-8 (AKDT)
- ZIP code: 99636
- Area code: 907
- FIPS code: 02-41500

Koliganek (Central Yupik: Qalirneq) is a census-designated place (CDP) in Dillingham Census Area, Alaska, United States. It is located along the Nushagak River. As of the 2020 census, Koliganek had a population of 183.

== Geography ==
Koliganek is located at 59°43′44″N 157°16′38″W (59.728817, -157.277244), along the Nushagak River.

According to the United States Census Bureau, the CDP has a total area of 16.8 square miles (43.4 km^{2}), of which 0.02 square miles (0.04 km^{2}), or 0.10%, is water.

== History ==
The present Koliganek is the third native village to bear the name along the Nushagak River since the late 19th century. The earliest of the three was known as "Kalignak", first settled about 1870 and was located at the junction of the Nushagak and Nuyakuk Rivers. It was later abandoned around 1940 and the residents removed to the second Koliganek, 5 miles further downstream, on the east bank across from the Napotoli Creek. A cemetery and some ruins remain there. In 1965, residents decided to relocate 4 miles further downstream, to where the present Koliganek exists. Neither of the previous villages are within the present boundaries of today's CDP.

The original Koliganek, reported as "Kalignak", about a dozen miles upstream at the junction of the Nushagak and Nuyakuk rivers, featured a population on the 1880 U.S. Census of 91 Inuit. The second village, about 4 miles upstream from the present village, now known as "Old Koliganek", reported on the 1950 and 1960 censuses with 90 and 100 residents, respectively. It was abandoned between 1963 and 1965.

== Demographics ==
Historical population
Census	Pop.	Note	%±
1970	142		—
1980	117		−17.6%
1990	181		54.7%
2000	182		0.6%
2010	209		14.8%
2020	183		−12.4%
U.S. Decennial Census

The present Koliganek first appeared on the 1970 U.S. Census shortly after its settlement in the 1960s. In 1980, it was made a census-designated place (CDP).

As of the census of 2000, there were 182 people, 53 households, and 35 families residing in the CDP. The population density was 14.6 inhabitants per square mile (5.6/km^{2}). There were 77 housing units at an average density of 6.2 per square mile (2.4/km^{2}). The racial makeup of the CDP was 10.44% White, 87.36% Native American, 2.20% from other races. 2.20% of the population were Hispanic or Latino of any race.

There were 53 households, out of which 43.4% had children under the age of 18 living with them, 52.8% were married couples living together, 9.4% had a female householder with no husband present, and 32.1% were non-families. 26.4% of all households were made up of individuals, and 5.7% had someone living alone who was 65 years of age or older. The average household size was 3.43 and the average family size was 4.44.

In the CDP, the population was spread out, with 42.3% under the age of 18, 6.6% from 18 to 24, 31.3% from 25 to 44, 11.5% from 45 to 64, and 8.2% who were 65 years of age or older. The median age was 26 years. For every 100 females, there were 122.0 males. For every 100 females age 18 and over, there were 133.3 males.

The median income for a household in the CDP was $44,583, and the median income for a family was $51,042. Males had a median income of $31,250 versus $30,417 for females. The per capita income for the CDP was $13,242. About 14.9% of families and 19.3% of the population were below the poverty line, including 20.0% of those under the age of eighteen and 53.3% of those 65 or over.

== Education ==
The Koliganek School of the Southwest Region School District serves the village.
