= Nushagak Bay =

Bay in the United States

Coordinates: 58°37′20″N 158°35′28″W

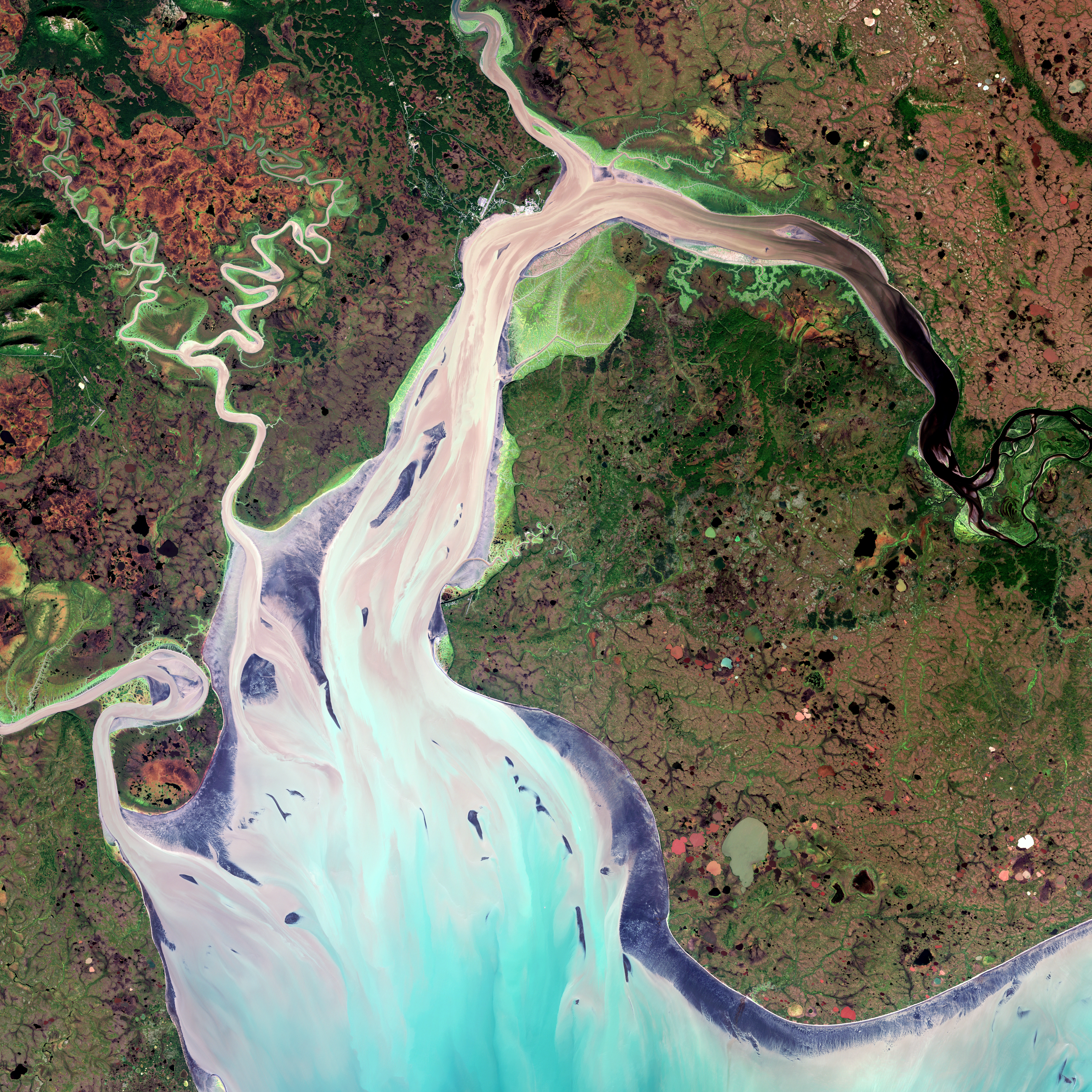
Satellite image of Nushagak Bay

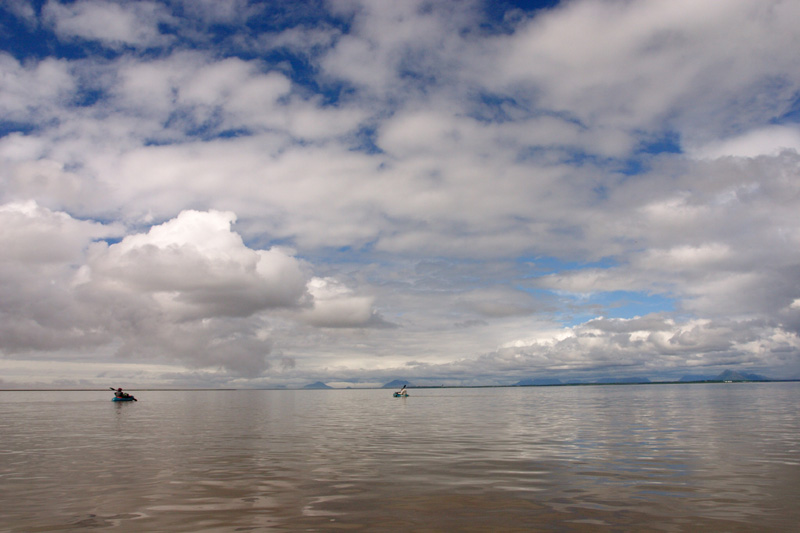
Packrafts in Nushagak Bay

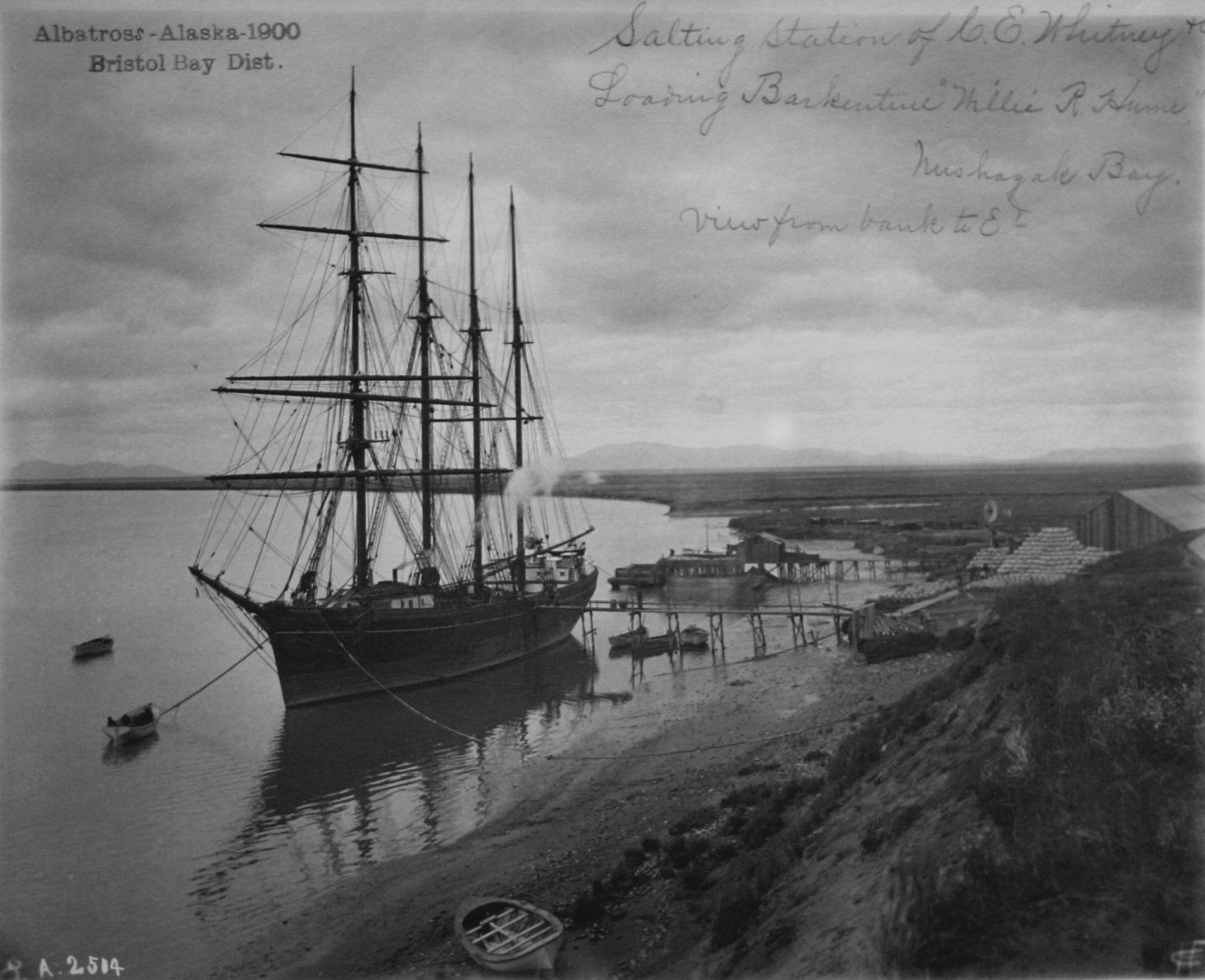
Salting station of C.E. Whitney and Co., loading the barkentine Willie R. Hume, Nushagak Bay, 1900

Nushagak Bay /ˈnuːʃɪɡæk/ is a large estuary covering over 62 miles (100 km) in southwest part of the U.S. state of Alaska. It opens to Bristol Bay, a large body of water in the eastern Bering Sea north of the Alaska Peninsula.

It is home to the area's largest city, Dillingham, and the bay hosts one of the world's last great sustainable sockeye salmon fisheries.

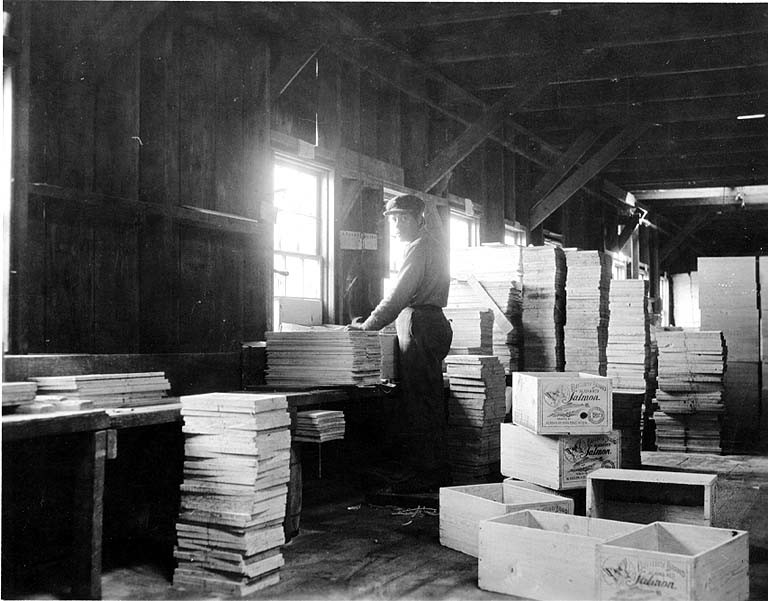
Cannery worker making boxes at Clarks Point, Nushagak Bay in 1918

Bristol Bay residents have historically valued the estuary resources for both subsistence gains and commercial profits. However, given the estuary's importance, there have been few comprehensive scientific studies conducted in the bay. Species diversity as measured through richness and total biomass is generally low with 16 macro invertebrate species encountered in a 2007 field study, including teleost fishes, isopods, amphipods, and crangon shrimps. During the summer 2007, Nushagak Bay was found to have a Shannon Diversity (H’) value of 1.54, ranking it below similar subarctic estuaries such as Ungava Bay, near Labrador (60°34’N, 67°35’W) and Lower Herring Bay in Price William Sound (60°30’N, 147°13’W) where the Shannon Diversity values are H’=2.11 and H’=2.5, respectively. This lower diversity of Nushagak Bay is most likely due to its low salinity, high turbidity, and silty sediments.

Nushagak Bay is downstream of the proposed Pebble Mine, whose tailings storage lake would sit at the headwaters of the Koktuli River, one of the Nushagak River's tributaries. Villages on the Nushagak are among the major opponents of the proposal.

The bay runs primarily north–south from the mouth of the Nushagak River to Bristol Bay some 30 miles (48 km) southward. The bay is also fed by several additional rivers, including the Wood, Igushik, and Snake rivers.
