= Nushagak River =

River in Alaska, USA

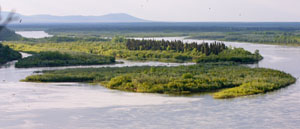
- Nushagak River

- Location of the mouth of the Nushagak River in Alaska
- Native name: Iilgayaq (Central Yupik)

Location
- Country: United States
- State: Alaska

Physical characteristics
- Source: Alaska Range
- Mouth: Nushagak Bay
  - location: Bristol Bay
  - coordinates: 58°47′58″N 158°37′57″W
  - elevation: 0 m (0 ft)
- Length: 280 mi (450 km)
- Basin size: 13,400 sq mi (35,000 km^{2})
- Discharge
  - location: mouth
  - average: 35,315 cu ft/s (1,000.0 m^{3}/s)

The Nushagak River /ˈnuːʃɪɡæk/ (Central Yupik: Iilgayaq) is a river in southwest Alaska, United States. It begins in the Alaska Range and flows southwest 450 km (280 mi) to Nushagak Bay, an inlet of Bristol Bay, east of Dillingham, Alaska.

The Mulchatna River is a major tributary. Other navigable tributaries include the Nuyakuk River and the King Salmon River.

Jet-boats are commonly used to access these tributaries and the upper Nushagak. The Wood River, Iowithla River and the Kokwok River are smaller tributaries.

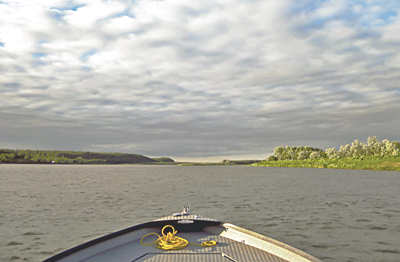
Nushagak Alaska jet boat

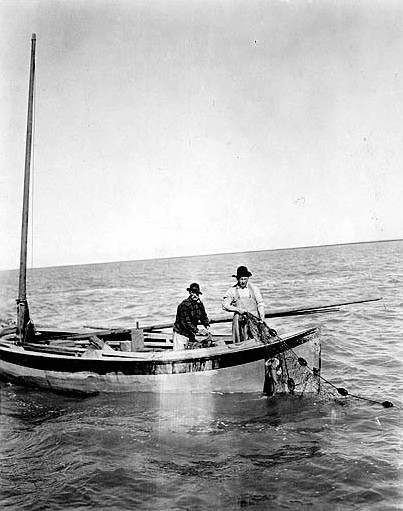
Fishermen gillnetting on the Nushagak River, 1917

The villages of Portage Creek, Ekwok, Koliganek and New Stuyahok are on the river. The town of Dillingham (Pop. 2,466) is on Nushagak Bay.

The Nushagak River is downstream of the proposed Pebble Mine, whose tailings storage lake would sit at the headwaters of the Koktuli River, one of the Nushagak's tributaries. Villages on the Nushagak are among the major opponents of the proposal.

Five species of Pacific salmon (Chinook, coho, sockeye, chum, and pink) spawn in the river or its tributaries. Commercial, subsistence and sport fishing are important in the area. Most notable is the annual run of king (Chinook) salmon which occurs from mid-June to mid-July. Rainbow trout, northern pike, grayling, burbot, whitefish and Arctic char are also present in the Nushagak. It is estimated that over 50% of the world's production of wild salmon is harvested in the Nushagak River and the Bristol Bay area.

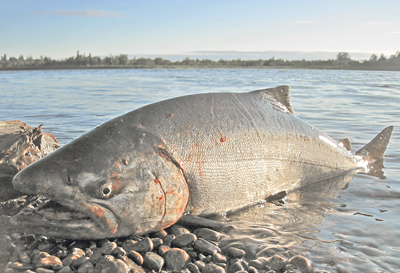
Nushagak Alaska Chinook salmon

== See also ==
- List of Alaska rivers
- List of rivers of the Americas by coastline
- Nushagak, Alaska
- Ekwok Community
