= Dillingham, Alaska =

Town in Alaska

Dillingham, Alaska Curyung
- City
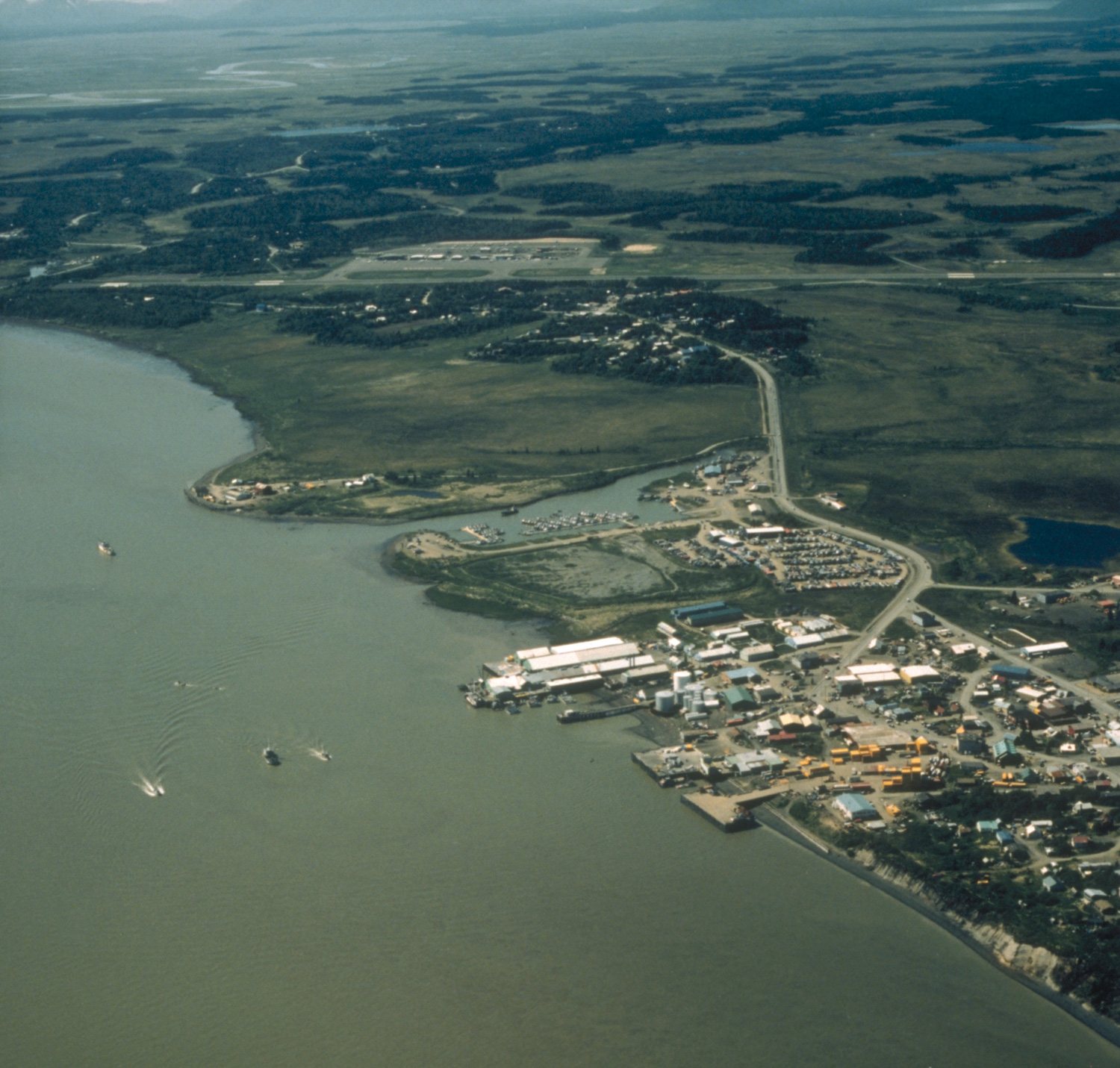
- Aerial view of Dillingham

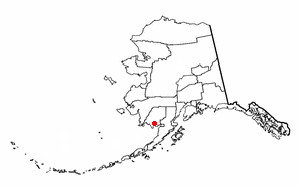
- Location of Dillingham, Alaska
- Coordinates: 59°02′48″N 158°30′31″W
- Country: United States
- State: Alaska
- Census Area: Dillingham
- Incorporated: July 12, 1963

Government
  - Mayor: Alice Ruby
  - State senator: Lyman Hoffman (D)
  - State rep.: Bryce Edgmon (I)

Area
  - Total: 36.07 sq mi (93.41 km^{2})
  - Land: 33.34 sq mi (86.35 km^{2})
  - Water: 2.73 sq mi (7.06 km^{2})
- Elevation: 95 ft (29 m)

Population (2020)
  - Total: 2,249
  - Density: 67.4/sq mi (26.04/km^{2})
- Time zone: UTC-9 (Alaska (AKST))
  - Summer (DST): UTC-8 (AKDT)
- ZIP code: 99576
- Area code: 907
- FIPS code: 02-18950
- GNIS feature ID: 1401203
- Website: dillinghamak.us

Dillingham /ˈdɪlɪŋhæm/ (Central Yupik: Curyung), also known as Curyung, is a city in Dillingham Census Area, Alaska, United States. Incorporated in 1963, it is an important commercial fishing port on Nushagak Bay. As per the 2020 census, the population of the city was 2,249, down from 2,329 in 2010.

== Geography ==
Dillingham is on Nushagak Bay at the mouth of the Nushagak River, an inlet of Bristol Bay, an arm of the Bering Sea in the North Pacific, in southwestern Alaska. It is located at 59°02′48″N 158°30′31″W (59.046751, -158.508665).

According to the United States Census Bureau, the city has a total area of 36.3 square miles (94.1 km^{2}). 33.6 square miles (86.9 km^{2}) of it is land, and 2.8 square miles (7.2 km^{2}) of it (7.64%) is water. This may change as the City of Dillingham will likely petition the State of Alaska to increase the size of its boundaries to include most of Nushagak Bay and Wood River, to gain revenue from the Nushagak District and Wood River Special Harvest Area commercial salmon fisheries.

Dillingham is located in the 37th district of the Alaska House of Representatives, and is represented by Independent Bryce Edgmon, who serves as Speaker for the Alaska House of Representatives.

== Transportation ==
Dillingham is not connected to the statewide road system, thus the only way to reach the city is by air or boat. Dillingham Airport, located near the center of the city limits, has a 6,400-foot (2,000 m) runway and is served (in the summertime) by several flights daily through Alaska Airlines; year-round flights are available through PenAir. A 20-mile (32 km) paved road connects Dillingham with Aleknagik and the Wood-Tikchik State Park. Many residents live along the Aleknagik Lake Road, among other roads, connecting the city's center with adjacent neighborhoods, such as Wood River and Kanakanak.

== Natural resources ==
Dillingham is the regional hub of the rich Bristol Bay salmon fishing district. Bristol Bay supports the world's largest runs of wild sockeye salmon and returns of other species of Pacific salmon. The Nushagak district produces an average of 6.4 million salmon annually and as many as 12.4 million salmon in 2006. Harvests are closely regulated by the Alaska Department of Fish and Game to ensure adequate spawning escapement to ensure long term sustainability and provide for subsistence harvests by residents of upriver villages.

Commercial fishing remains an important part of the Dillingham economy, but prices paid for salmon vary due to international competition, especially from fish farming operations in Chile, Norway, Canada and elsewhere. Prices paid Bristol Bay fishermen for fresh sockeye salmon peaked at $2.11 per pound in 1988 but fell to just $0.42 per pound in 2001. Prices have since rebounded due to techniques to improve fish quality and enhanced marketing efforts, and were back up to $2.35 per pound in 2013, rising to $3.02 in 2016 when reporting ceased. Processed fresh sockeye were priced commercially at $6.43 per pound in 2019.

Dillingham is an important gateway to many sport fishing lodges and eco-tourism opportunities. Many of these are focused on the adjacent Wood-Tikchik State Park, the largest state park in the United States, known for its great fishing opportunities. Dillingham is also the headquarters for nearby Togiak National Wildlife Refuge, home to walruses, seals, terrestrial mammals, migratory birds, and fish, as well as one of the largest wild herring fisheries in the world. Togiak National Wildlife Refuge was established to conserve fish and wildlife populations and habitats in their natural diversity, including salmon, to fulfill international treaty obligations, to provide for continued subsistence use, and to ensure necessary water quality and quantity.

In 2010, the City of Dillingham voted to re-authorize its position opposing the proposed Pebble Mine, a large gold-copper-molybdenum prospect located at the headwaters of Bristol Bay. The resolution explains that the value of the fishery totals about $100 million a year; that the commercial wild salmon fishery has been the backbone of livelihoods for more than 100 years; that the future of the renewable resource industry depends on its freshwater stream reputation; that local residents depend on subsistence activities which in turn depend on Bristol Bay's pristine freshwater streams and habitat; and that Pebble threatens to destroy the last great wild salmon fishery on the planet.

== Demographics ==
Historical population
Census	Pop.	Note	%±
1910	165		—
1920	182		10.3%
1930	85		−53.3%
1940	278		227.1%
1950	577		107.6%
1960	424		−26.5%
1970	914		115.6%
1980	1,563		71.0%
1990	2,017		29.0%
2000	2,466		22.3%
2010	2,329		−5.6%
2020	2,249		−3.4%
U.S. Decennial Census

Dillingham first appeared on the 1910 U.S. Census as the unincorporated village of Kanakanak. In 1920, it returned as Chogiung and in 1930 and every successive census as Dillingham. It formally incorporated in 1963. See: Historic Locales & Confusion Over Place Names Around Dillingham

=== 2020 census ===
As of the 2020 census, Dillingham had a population of 2,249. The median age was 33.2 years. 27.9% of residents were under the age of 18 and 11.2% of residents were 65 years of age or older. For every 100 females there were 99.9 males, and for every 100 females age 18 and over there were 106.5 males age 18 and over.

0.0% of residents lived in urban areas, while 100.0% lived in rural areas.

There were 821 households in Dillingham, of which 37.1% had children under the age of 18 living in them. Of all households, 39.0% were married-couple households, 24.1% were households with a male householder and no spouse or partner present, and 25.7% were households with a female householder and no spouse or partner present. About 30.3% of all households were made up of individuals and 8.1% had someone living alone who was 65 years of age or older.

There were 994 housing units, of which 17.4% were vacant. The homeowner vacancy rate was 0.8% and the rental vacancy rate was 12.2%.

Racial composition as of the 2020 census
Race	Number	Percent
White	590	26.2%
Black or African American	21	0.9%
American Indian and Alaska Native	1,244	55.3%
Asian	40	1.8%
Native Hawaiian and Other Pacific Islander	9	0.4%
Some other race	24	1.1%
Two or more races	321	14.3%
Hispanic or Latino (of any race)	92	4.1%

=== 2000 census ===
As of the census of 2000, there were 2,466 people, 884 households, and 599 families residing in the city. The population density was 73.4 inhabitants per square mile (28.3/km^{2}). There were 1,000 housing units at an average density of 29.7 units per square mile (11.5 units/km^{2}). The racial makeup of the city was 52.6% Native American, 35.6% White, 1.2% Asian, 0.7% Black or African American, 0.6% from other races, and 9.4% from two or more races. 3.5% of the population were Hispanic or Latino of any race.

There were 884 households, out of which 41.3% had children under the age of 18 living with them, 47.4% were married couples living together, 15.3% had a female householder with no husband present, and 32.2% were non-families. 27.6% of all households were made up of individuals, and 4.2% had someone living alone who was 65 years of age or older. The average household size was 2.75 and the average family size was 3.37.

In the city, the age distribution of the population shows 34.6% under the age of 18, 6.6% from 18 to 24, 30.6% from 25 to 44, 23.2% from 45 to 64, and 5.0% who were 65 years of age or older. The median age was 33 years. For every 100 females, there were 106.7 males. For every 100 females age 18 and over, there were 102.5 males.

The median income for a household in the city was $51,458, and the median income for a family was $57,417. Males had a median income of $47,266 versus $34,934 for females. The per capita income for the city was $21,537. About 10.1% of families and 11.7% of the population were below the poverty line, including 14.4% of those under age 18.

=== Crime ===
Per-capita crime rates in Dillingham are persistently higher than state and national averages. In 2007, the city experienced the nation's highest rate of forcible rape per person, with 1 incident for every 103.9 residents. The city ranked 22nd (out of 8,659 cities with available data) for overall violent crime, with 1 incident for every 32.8 residents. The 2013 figures again demonstrate a high per-capita incidence of rape, indicating 1 incident for every 152.4 residents. (A note of caution regarding interpretation of the UCR data from which this information is drawn can be found on the FBI/UCR website.)

== History ==
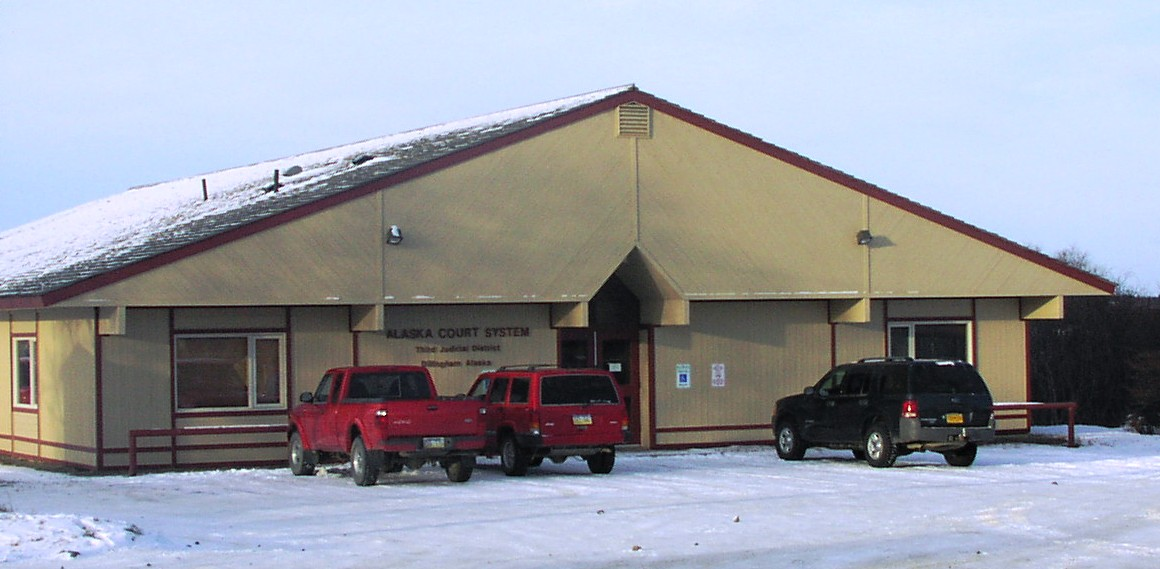
Courthouse in Dillingham

Dillingham and its surrounding areas were inhabited by the Yup'ik people for millennia, who lived off of the land and sea. British Navy Captain James Cook first charted the Bristol Bay region in 1778, but did not venture into Nushagak Bay. The Russian-American Company built a redoubt (trading post) at Nushagak Point, across the river from present-day Dillingham, in 1818; named "Alexandrovski" after the czar, the post attracted fur traders from as far as the Kuskokwim River, the Alaska Peninsula, and Cook Inlet. In 1837, a Russian Orthodox mission was built at Nushagak, but the post's status was later downgraded in favor of other Russian-American Company posts in the Kuskokwim. In 1881, after the Alaska Purchase by the United States, the U.S. Signal Corps built a weather station at Nushagak.

In 1883, the Arctic Packing Company constructed the first cannery and seafood-processing plant in Bristol Bay at Kanulik, across the river from the site of modern-day Dillingham. Operations began the following year, with a pack of 400 cases of salmon, or 19.2k one-pound cans. By 1903, a total of ten canneries had been built along the Nushagak, including four within the city's current limits, producing as many as one million cases of canned salmon annually. Most of these canneries were closed in the 20th century for a variety of reasons, including coastal erosion, siltation, consolidation, and general changes in the industry, such as shifting focus to frozen fish.

In 1901, the Alaska-Portland Packers Association built a cannery near Snag Point, at what is now the city's central business district. This cannery burned down in 1910, but was rebuilt the following year and was acquired by Pacific American Fisheries in 1929. Now known as Peter Pan Seafoods, the cannery in downtown Dillingham remains operational, and other seafood companies maintain corporate offices and support facilities within the city's limits.

A courthouse was built in Kanakanak in 1903 and named after United States Senator William Paul Dillingham of Vermont, whose senate subcommittee investigated conditions in Alaska following the 1898 gold rush. Despite extensive travels throughout the territory, neither Dillingham nor his subcommittee ever set foot in the Bristol Bay region. Nonetheless, the post office later adopted the name, as did the entire community.

In 1918 and 1919, the global Spanish flu pandemic struck Bristol Bay, leaving no more than 500 survivors around Dillingham. A hospital and orphanage was established in Kanakanak after the epidemic, 6 miles (10 km) south of downtown Dillingham. An Indian Health Service hospital, operated by the Bristol Bay Area Health Corporation, remains at Kanakanak.

The Dillingham News, the first local newspaper, was published in 1947 by the Dillingham Volunteer Fire Department as a way to attract new members. It was soon succeeded by the Beacon of Dillingham, a newspaper closely aligned by the unions of resident fishermen and cannery workers. Both were simple mimeograph editions.

In 1951, powerboats were first allowed to replace the sailboats used by fishermen in the Bristol Bay salmon fishery.

The City of Dillingham incorporated as a first class municipality in 1963.

In 1974, the first regional AM radio station for the Bristol Bay region was built by the Dillingham City School District under an educational grant. With the call letters KDLG and operating at 670 kHz, the station continues to provide education, entertainment, and important safety information to the fishing fleet and the surrounding communities. It is part of the National Public Radio (NPR) and Alaska Public Radio (APRN) networks.

Present-day industries around Dillingham are commercial salmon and herring fishing, seafood processing, sport fishing, government-related jobs and tourism.

Dillingham attracted national attention in 2006, when it installed 80 cameras at city-owned facilities and locations, such as the docks, harbor and police station, all funded by a Department of Homeland Security grant. The city justified the cameras by stating that they enhanced the ability to monitor and enforce security measures at those properties. Many criticized the project as an infringement on privacy, and also were critical that the funds were intended for national, rather than local, public safety issues. After spirited public debate, locally and nationally, the community held a referendum vote on the system on October 12, 2006, resulting in a rejection of the anti-camera initiative by a vote of 370 to 235.

On August 9, 2010, a DHC-3T Texas Turbine Otter crashed near Dillingham due to fog and reduced visibility. Former President Pro Tempore and Senator Ted Stevens was among the five killed aboard the plane. There were four survivors, including former NASA Administrator and EADS executive Sean O'Keefe.

On September 2, 2015, President Barack Obama visited Dillingham, as a part of his second-term trip around Alaska to call attention to climate change.

== Placenames ==
Beginning in 1880, when census enumerators visited the present area of Dillingham at the northwest side of Nushagak Bay, they recorded only one village, that of Anagnak. Anagnak was apparently located on the Wood River near where it flows into Nushagak Bay, and it reported 87 Inuit residents.

In 1890, enumerators reported two separate villages: Bradford and Kanakanak. Bradford, located at Bradford Point, was a cannery which reported 166 residents: 83 Asians, 82 Whites and 1 Native. Approximately "1 kilometer south" was the other village of Kanakanak, which reported 53 residents, all native. The earlier village of Anagnak (also called Anugnak) did not report at all.

In 1900, only one community was reported: Kanakanak (erroneously spelled on the census as "Knankanak"). However, this village, which reported 145 residents (but no racial breakdown), was not the same Kanakanak reported on the 1890 census. This was apparently a "new" village that had taken over the site of the former Bradford (and the cannery itself was demolished shortly after 1900). The previous Kanakanak was called "Old Kanakanak." It was unknown if the "New" Kanakanak also included any residents from the old village.

In 1910, as with 1900, only one community was reported, and that was Kanakanak (this time correctly spelled), with 165 residents. However, again, this was apparently not the same locale in either the 1890 or 1900 censuses, but was located at Snag Point, about 3 miles north of the 1900 Kanakanak village. The alternative name reported was "Chogiung." It was here in 1904 that the Dillingham Post Office first opened. At this time, it featured three different names (Chogiung, Kanakanak and Dillingham). Because census enumerators did not attempt to place the locales and boundaries on a map, it contributed to the confusion, which would persist for at least 4 more censuses.

In 1920, the census reported two villages: Chogiung and Dillingham. Chogiung, with 182 residents, was apparently the renamed 1910 Kanakanak (3rd village), but also was known as the Dillingham Post Office as this was the village at Snag Point. Again, compounding the confusion was the first appearance of the village of Dillingham. But this was apparently not the village with the post office, but the location of the former cannery of Bradford from the 1890 census and the 1900 "New" Kanakanak, and featured just 36 residents. Because of the influenza pandemic preceding the 1920 census, it caused much upheaval and movement of native persons all over Alaska, with the survivors of decimated villages relocating to new locales.

In 1930, the census reported three separate villages: Dillingham, Kanakanak & Wood River. This Dillingham reported just 85 residents, and apparently was the renamed Chogiung/3rd Kanakanak village (however, it's possible that it may have been the same 1920 Dillingham owing to the number of residents, and that it was erroneously reported). The second village was Kanakanak, which reported 177 residents. This was apparently the former 1920 Dillingham and "New" Kanakanak (the 2nd village from 1900). As cited, it is entirely possible that Dillingham & Kanakanak were incorrectly reported under the others' names, and further research on individuals reported living in each would be required to solve this possible mystery. The third village cited on the 1930 census was Wood River (with 55 residents). This was apparently the locale of the 1880 Inuit village of Anagnak (Anugnak), which had not reported in 50 years.

In 1940, the census reported just two villages: Dillingham & Kanakanak. Dillingham now reported 278 residents, and the presumption was that it was the present village at Snag Point. Kanakanak (the "New" or 2nd village and former Dillingham) reported 113 residents. Neither figure was able to adequately resolve the question as to whether the 1930 population figures were accidentally attributed to the wrong community.

1950 would be the last time both villages, Dillingham & Kanakanak, would report. Dillingham would report 577 residents, while Kanakanak had declined to just 54 residents. In 1960 and in every successive census, Dillingham would be the sole community on the northwest Nushagak Bay to report on the census, and would formally incorporate as a city in 1963.

As for attempts to locate where the other census-reported villages (or remains of) are located at present, Anagnak (or Anugnak) (1880)/Wood Point (1930), is now within the present Dillingham city boundaries. Bradford (1890)/"New" Kanakanak (1900)/"1st" Dillingham (1920) (at Bradford Point) has since been annexed into the present Dillingham. The (3rd) Kanakanak (1910)/Chogiung (1920) is the present downtown of Dillingham. Only the original or "Old" Kanakanak apparently is outside the present city boundaries, just to the south of the Kanakanak Hospital.

Sources: 1880-1960 U.S. Censuses; Dictionary of Alaska Place Names by Donald J. Orth Historic Settlement Patterns In The Nushagak River Region, Alaska by James W. Vanstone

== Education ==
The University of Alaska Fairbanks Bristol Bay Campus (BBC), located in Dillingham, became one of five rural campuses in the College of Rural Alaska in 1987. The campus serves an area of approximately 55,000 square miles (140,000 km^{2}) and a total of 32 communities as far south as Ivanof Bay, as far north as Port Alsworth, as far west as Togiak, and east to King Salmon. The main campus is located in Dillingham with outreach centers in King Salmon, Togiak, and New Stuyahok. BBC offers bachelor's degrees, associate degrees, certificates, and occupational endorsements, as well as local courses covering a variety of subjects from computers and welding to art. The Bristol Bay Campus also hosts an Alaska Sea Grant Marine Advisory Program (MAP) Agent.

- University of Alaska Fairbanks Bristol Bay Campus

Dillingham City School District operates two public schools serving Dillingham: Dillingham Elementary School and Dillingham Middle/High School.

The Southwest Region School District, which serves rural communities in the Dillingham Census Area, maintains its headquarters in Dillingham.

The Seventh Day Adventist Church in Dillingham operates a K-12 school.

== Climate ==
Dillingham has a typical subarctic climate (Köppen climate classification: Dfc), relatively average by Alaskan standards. Summers are mild and rainy with cool nights. Winters are long, cold, and very snowy.

Climate data for Dillingham (1981–2010 normals, extremes 1919–2001)
Month	Jan	Feb	Mar	Apr	May	Jun	Jul	Aug	Sep	Oct	Nov	Dec	Year
Record high °F (°C)	53 (12)	54 (12)	60 (16)	63 (17)	77 (25)	92 (33)	87 (31)	81 (27)	73 (23)	70 (21)	52 (11)	51 (11)	92 (33)
Mean maximum °F (°C)	36.6 (2.6)	37.5 (3.1)	40.0 (4.4)	49.2 (9.6)	63.1 (17.3)	70.8 (21.6)	72.4 (22.4)	70.5 (21.4)	61.1 (16.2)	51.1 (10.6)	41.0 (5.0)	37.0 (2.8)	75.7 (24.3)
Mean daily maximum °F (°C)	20.7 (−6.3)	24.0 (−4.4)	28.4 (−2.0)	37.8 (3.2)	50.3 (10.2)	58.1 (14.5)	61.2 (16.2)	59.8 (15.4)	52.7 (11.5)	39.3 (4.1)	27.5 (−2.5)	22.6 (−5.2)	40.2 (4.6)
Daily mean °F (°C)	15.1 (−9.4)	18.2 (−7.7)	22.3 (−5.4)	31.6 (−0.2)	43.3 (6.3)	51.2 (10.7)	55.1 (12.8)	53.6 (12.0)	46.8 (8.2)	33.4 (0.8)	22.2 (−5.4)	17.1 (−8.3)	34.2 (1.2)
Mean daily minimum °F (°C)	9.5 (−12.5)	12.5 (−10.8)	16.3 (−8.7)	26.5 (−3.1)	36.4 (2.4)	44.4 (6.9)	49.0 (9.4)	47.4 (8.6)	40.0 (4.4)	27.6 (−2.4)	16.9 (−8.4)	11.6 (−11.3)	28.2 (−2.1)
Mean minimum °F (°C)	−18.7 (−28.2)	−15.7 (−26.5)	−4.9 (−20.5)	8.5 (−13.1)	26.5 (−3.1)	36.4 (2.4)	42.1 (5.6)	37.1 (2.8)	28.5 (−1.9)	9.8 (−12.3)	−4.5 (−20.3)	−12.4 (−24.7)	−25.5 (−31.9)
Record low °F (°C)	−53 (−47)	−35 (−37)	−30 (−34)	−17 (−27)	10 (−12)	26 (−3)	31 (−1)	26 (−3)	11 (−12)	0 (−18)	−26 (−32)	−30 (−34)	−53 (−47)
Average precipitation inches (mm)	1.74 (44)	1.12 (28)	1.66 (42)	0.88 (22)	1.25 (32)	2.04 (52)	2.64 (67)	3.84 (98)	3.62 (92)	2.40 (61)	2.34 (59)	1.79 (45)	25.32 (643)
Average snowfall inches (cm)	22.8 (58)	9.8 (25)	14.7 (37)	4.7 (12)	0.3 (0.76)	0.0 (0.0)	0.0 (0.0)	0.0 (0.0)	0.1 (0.25)	3.1 (7.9)	17.5 (44)	17.9 (45)	90.9 (231)
Average precipitation days (≥ 0.01 inch)	10.7	7.4	8.5	7.8	11.3	13.9	14.0	15.9	16.1	10.9	12.4	11.9	140.8
Average snowy days (≥ 0.1 inch)	8.6	5.3	6.8	3.2	0.3	0.0	0.0	0.0	0.1	2.1	7.0	8.4	41.8
Source 1: NOAA
Source 2: XMACIS2 (mean maxima/minima 1981–2010),

== Notable residents ==
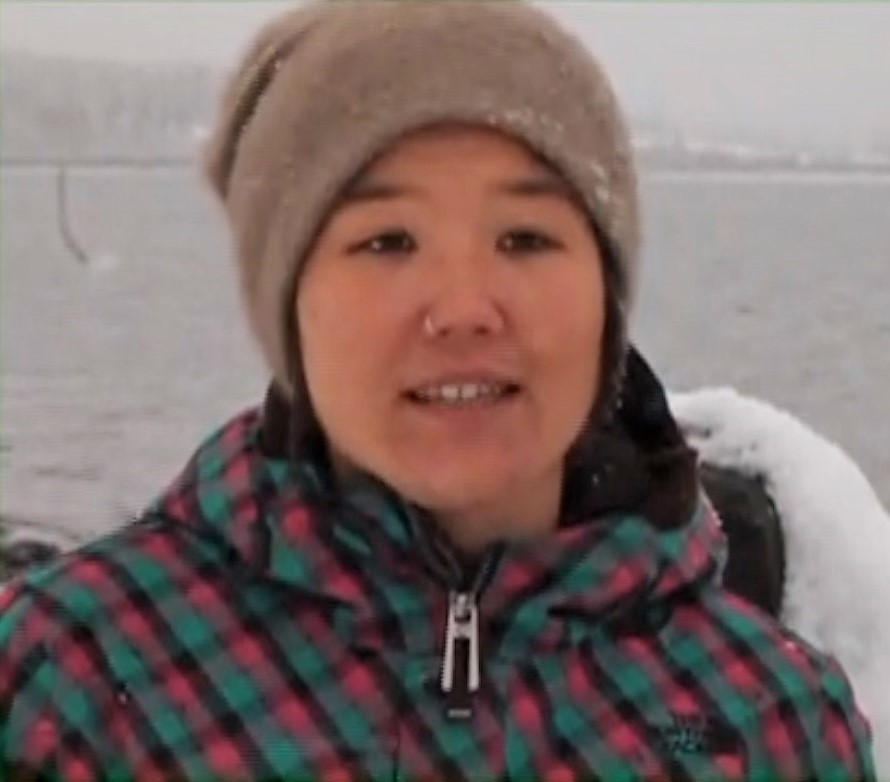
Callan Chythlook-Sifsof

- Callan Chythlook-Sifsof (born 1989), Olympic snowboarder
- Bryce Edgmon (born 1961), member of the Alaska House of Representatives
- Todd Palin (born 1964), businessman who was the first gentleman of Alaska from 2006 to 2009

== See also ==
- Nushagak Bay
- Southwest Alaska
- Wood-Tikchik State Park
