= Skarland =

Skarland may also refer to:

== People ==
- Ivar Skarland (1899–1965), Norwegian anthropologist
- Julie Skarland (born 1960), Norwegian visual artist

== Other uses ==
- Mount Skarland, a mountain in Alaska
- Rainey-Skarland Cabin, log cabin in Alaska
