= Alaska Territorial Guard =

WWII-era American reserve force

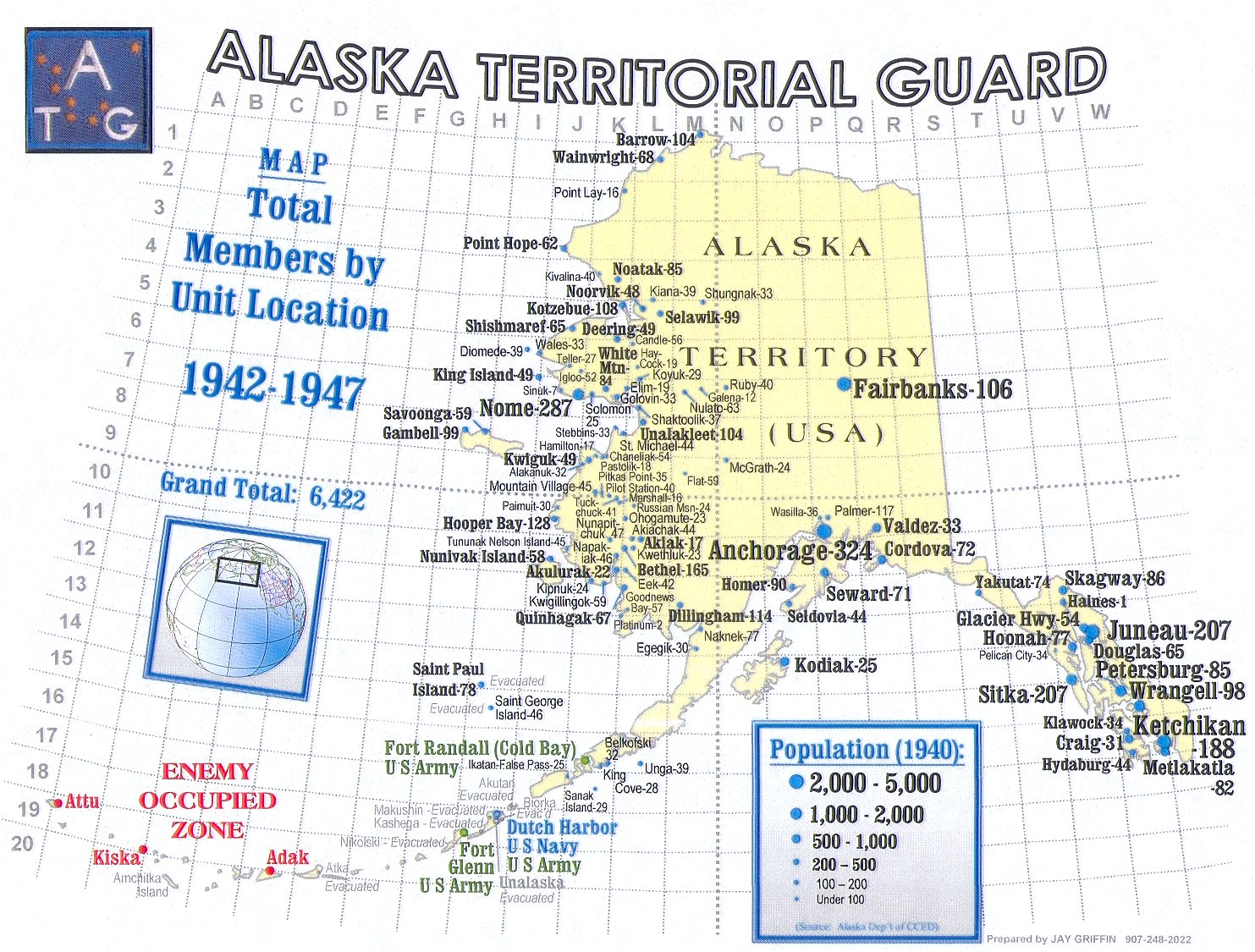
- Map showing the locations of ATG units (with membership counts), major military bases, and evacuated villages
- Active: June 1942 – March 31, 1947
- Country: United States of America
- Branch: United States Army
- Type: Military reserve force
- Role: Defense of Alaska
- Size: 6,389 personnel
- Garrison/HQ: Juneau, Alaska Territory, United States
- Nicknames: Eskimo Scouts, Tundra Army
- Engagements: World War II: Aleutian Islands campaign

Commanders
- Notable commanders: Marvin R. Marston

Insignia
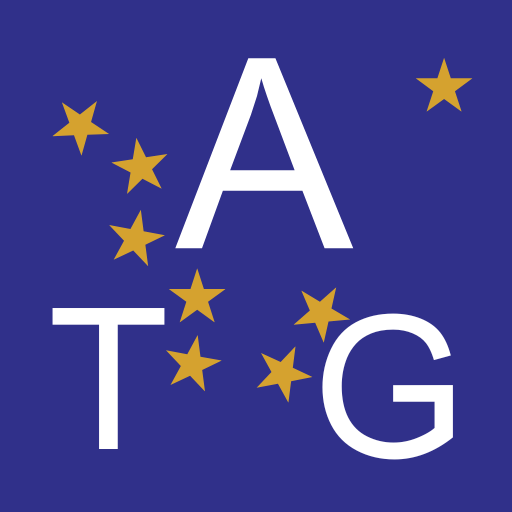
- Original Alaska Territorial Guard patch, created in 1942

The Alaska Territorial Guard (ATG), more commonly known as the Eskimo Scouts, was a military reserve force of the US Army. It was organized in 1942 in response to the attack on Pearl Harbor in Hawaii, and the occupation of parts of Alaska by Japan during World War II. The ATG operated until 1947, with 6,368 unpaid volunteers being enrolled from 107 communities throughout Alaska, and 21 paid staff, according to an official roster. For the first time, the ATG brought together members of the Aleut, Athabaskan, White, Inupiaq, Haida, Tlingit, Tsimshian, Yupik, and other ethnic groups in a joint effort. In later years, all members of some native units demonstrated expert marksmanship. Among the 27 or more women members was at least one whose marksmanship exceeded the men. The ages of members at enrollment ranged from 80 years old to as young as 12 (both extremes occurring mostly in sparsely populated areas). ATG members were mainly those who were too young or too old to be eligible for conscription during the war.

One first-hand estimate states that around 20,000 Alaskans participated, officially or otherwise, in ATG reconnaissance or support activities. The force served many vital strategic purposes to the Allied effort during WWII:

- Safeguarding the only source of the strategic metal platinum in the Western Hemisphere against Japanese attack.
- Securing the terrain around the vital Lend-Lease air route between the United States and the Soviet Union.
- Placing and maintaining survival caches primarily along transportation corridors and coastal regions.

In addition to official duties, ATG members are noted for actively and successfully promoting racial integration in the US Armed Forces, and racial equality within the communities they protected.

Several former members of the ATG were instrumental in achieving Alaskan statehood in 1959, as members of the Alaska Statehood Committee or delegates to the Alaska Constitutional Convention.

In 2000 all ATG members were granted US veteran status by law, acknowledging their contributions, some of whom are still living. Efforts to find surviving ATG members and assist them through the application process are difficult due to a lack of written records, oral cultures, lack of trained staff, passage of time, and unclear bureaucracies and advocates. Nevertheless, active correction of the historical record is proceeding through the Alaska Army National Guard, office of Cultural Resources Management and Tribal Liaison, as well as the Department of Veterans Affairs.

== Conditions leading to formation ==
Before World War II, Alaska was regarded by US military decision makers as too distant from the contiguous United States to effectively protect, and of little strategic importance.

"... the mainland of Alaska is so remote from the strategic areas of the Pacific that it is difficult to conceive of circumstances in which air operations therefrom would contribute materially to the national defense." – General Malin Craig, US Army Chief of Staff, November 1937

This stands in marked contrast to the attitudes of US military leaders during the Cold War after World War II:

"... as I continue to correspond and to talk with people throughout the United States and the Department of Defense, they too can see clearly the importance of these two battalions which you make up. The real honest-to-God and real-world first line of defense in Alaska ... nearer our opponent, Communist Russia, than any other armed troops in the United States." – General James F. Hollingsworth, Commanding General, US Army Alaska (USARAL), February 1971

True to the earlier viewpoint, the US Army reassigned all Alaska National Guard units out of Alaska to Washington state in August 1941. Alaska was then without military reserves or any form of territorial defense force. In the face of the encroaching Japanese, the defense of nearly 34,000 miles (55,000 km) of US coastline was left to the best efforts of unorganized local citizens and already overworked seasonal laborers. The Japanese demonstrated a definite interest in taking Alaska. In the early months of 1942, a reconnaissance unit of the Japanese Navy was caught making detailed surveys of the Alaska coastline.

Japanese soldiers strode unopposed onto American soil and made inquiries among the populace about the local economy. Enemy aircraft and submarine sightings were common, inspiring great fear among the locals, and culminating in the raid on Dutch Harbor and the occupation of the Aleutian Islands of Attu, Kiska and Adak that June.

== Creation ==
By the time of the Dutch Harbor bombing, Major Marston had submitted a new plan to defend the entire Alaska coast by enlisting the local citizens. He had conceived this plan while visiting Saint Lawrence Island and contemplating the fate of the locals he had met. Marston's proposal finally met with favor when word of it got to Alaska territorial governor Ernest Gruening. Gruening had sought to organize a new guard for Alaska, including every able man and boy, since he got word that the US Army would reassign the Alaska National Guard.

Motivated by the recent Dutch Harbor attack, within days the Alaska Command assigned Major Marston and Captain Carl Schreibner to serve as military aides to Governor Gruening. Shortly after, Gruening and Marston flew a chartered plane to begin setting up units of the new Alaska Territorial Guard. This included one of the most strategically important sites in Alaska, a tiny mining town called Platinum—the only source of the metal in all the Western Hemisphere.

The enrollment drive continued into early 1943, the organizers travelling in all kinds of weather and by every available mode of transport, including airplane, boat, snowmobile, foot, and the most reliable means in the region, dogsled. When a promised plane failed to arrive after a week, Major Marston set out by dogsled on a 680-mile (1,090 km) trip around the Seward Peninsula, during the coldest winter in 25 years. He survived by foregoing standard military survival training in favor of the native methods of his Eskimo and Office of Strategic Services guide, Sammy Mogg.

Due to Marston and Mogg's effort, the ATG stood as a first line of defense for the terrain around the Lend-Lease route from America to the Soviet Union, against an attack by Japan and the Axis powers. This vital lifeline allowed the US to supply its ally with essential military aircraft. This lifeline proved to be crucial to the USSR's survival during Operation Barbarossa.

== Organization ==
=== Authority ===
The Alaska Territorial Guard was organized in June 1942 under the authority of the office of the territorial governor, Ernest Gruening, who served as Commander-In-Chief. All members took an oath to obey the Governor's orders. The governor was directly supported by ATG Adjutant General, J. P. Williams. The force's headquarters was in the territorial capital of Juneau.

=== Mission ===
The mission of the ATG was to play a defensive role for the entire coast of Alaska. Offensive action was the responsibility of the commander-in-chief of the Pacific Ocean Areas, with North Pacific forces operating from large bases at Dutch Harbor, Cold Bay and Anchorage.

Explicit within the ATG mission was protecting the terrain around the American terminus of the Lend-Lease air route to the Soviet Union, on which warplanes were flown from Great Falls, Montana to Whitehorse, Canada, then to Ladd Field, Alaska and on to Nome. Soviet pilots flew the planes from there to the Soviet Far East.

=== By Date ===
The Alaska Territorial Guard operated from its inception in June 1942 until it was officially disbanded on 31 March 1947.

=== By Geographic Area ===
The Territory of Alaska was divided vertically by the 156th meridian west into Eastern and Western Areas. To the Eastern Area was added Southwest Alaska, including the Aleutian Islands, which had been evacuated of non-combatants.

The Western Area had a Field Headquarters in Nome, with the offices of the Commander, Quartermaster, Instructors, Public Relations Officer and Chaplains. Other field staff were located in Anchorage, Koyuk, Selawik and Gambell (on Saint Lawrence Island, where Major Marston first conceived his plan).

The Eastern Area was headquartered in Juneau and held the offices of Property Officer (a role filled by the Adjutant General) and Instructors. Field staff were assigned to Glacier Highway, Douglas, Ketchikan, Palmer, Hoonah and Sitka.

=== By Ethnic Group ===
The Alaska Territorial Guard was drawn from 107 communities and from these ethnic groups: Aleut, Athabascan, White, Inupiaq, Haida, Tlingit, Tsimshian, Yup'ik, and probably more.

=== By Rank ===
The ATG, being organized by US Army officers, made use of the same US Army rank structure, with these exceptions:

- Throughout its duration, no member rose above the rank of lieutenant colonel, including the force's adjutant general.
- The designation private appears to have been little used, though most members held the rank of private.

=== By Workload and Pay ===
The 21 staff officers were all full-time, paid positions (except for the governor, whose ATG duties were in addition to his regular office and without added salary). All other positions were strictly part-time volunteer, without pay.

=== By Sex ===
That total includes at least 27 ATG members who were women. Most women served as nurses at the field hospital in Kotzebue, although at least one woman served the ATG's primary mission alongside the men. Laura Beltz Wright of Haycock is also noted for being the best sharpshooter in her company, scoring 98% bulls-eyes.

=== By Age ===
The age of ATG members at enrollment ranged from 80 years old to as young as twelve, even though official regulations put the minimum age at sixteen.

=== By Number ===
All told, there were 6,389 members of the Alaska Territorial Guard, according to an official roster.

=== Unofficial tally ===
Alongside those who served in the ATG, many others worked to support them, including serving food, providing equipment and supplies to the quartermaster, and repair work. Marston estimated 20,000 Alaskans materially participated in ATG activities, in the Western Area alone.

== Activities ==
All ATG members except the 21 staff officers served without pay, and had to perform their ATG duties in addition to the often difficult challenges of subsisting in Arctic and extreme marine environments.

The ATG trained for and actively carried out the following:

- Issuing of weapons and ammunition
- Instruction, drill and target practice
- Transport of equipment and supplies
- Construction of buildings and facilities
- Construction of airstrips and support facilities for other military agencies as needed
- Coastal and inland scouting patrols
- Breaking hundreds of miles of wilderness trails
- Setup and repair of dozens of emergency shelter cabins
- Distribution of emergency food and ammunition containers for the US Navy
- Firefighting
- Land and sea rescue
- Enemy combat

The ATG received commendations for shooting down Japanese air balloons carrying bombs and eavesdropping radios, and rescuing a downed airman. In addition, some ATG members performed medical care at the field hospital in Kotzebue

== Artists ==
During the 1930s, as part of FDR's New Deal programs to ease the country out of the Great Depression, the Works Progress Administration (WPA) hired many noted American artists. Upon US entry into World War II, several WPA artists took work with the War Department. A few of the artists made their way to Alaska to help document the Aleutian Campaign and other Alaskan military operations, including the Alaska Territorial Guard. Some of their work was featured nationwide on a number of wartime posters. The artists included:

- Magnus Colcord "Rusty" Heurlin – An ATG lieutenant, his painting was reproduced as the posters "Back the Attack" and "From Metlakatla to Barrow – The Territorial Guard".
- Joe Jones
- Henry Varnum Poor – His "Major Muktuk Marston Signs Up Soldiers" now hangs in the Pentagon's Hall of Fame.

Other artists, born in Alaska and already well-known, gained further exposure through contact with ATG members and artists:

- Florence Nupok Malewotkuk – a Siberian Yupik from Saint Lawrence Island. Her work was promoted in the 1920s by Otto Geist, later an ATG major.
- George Aden Ahgupuk (also known by the indigenous name Twok) – a Shishmaref artist since boyhood and later the village's postmaster, he was befriended by Major Marston, who wrote and spoke of his artistry within and outside the ATG.

== Influence ==
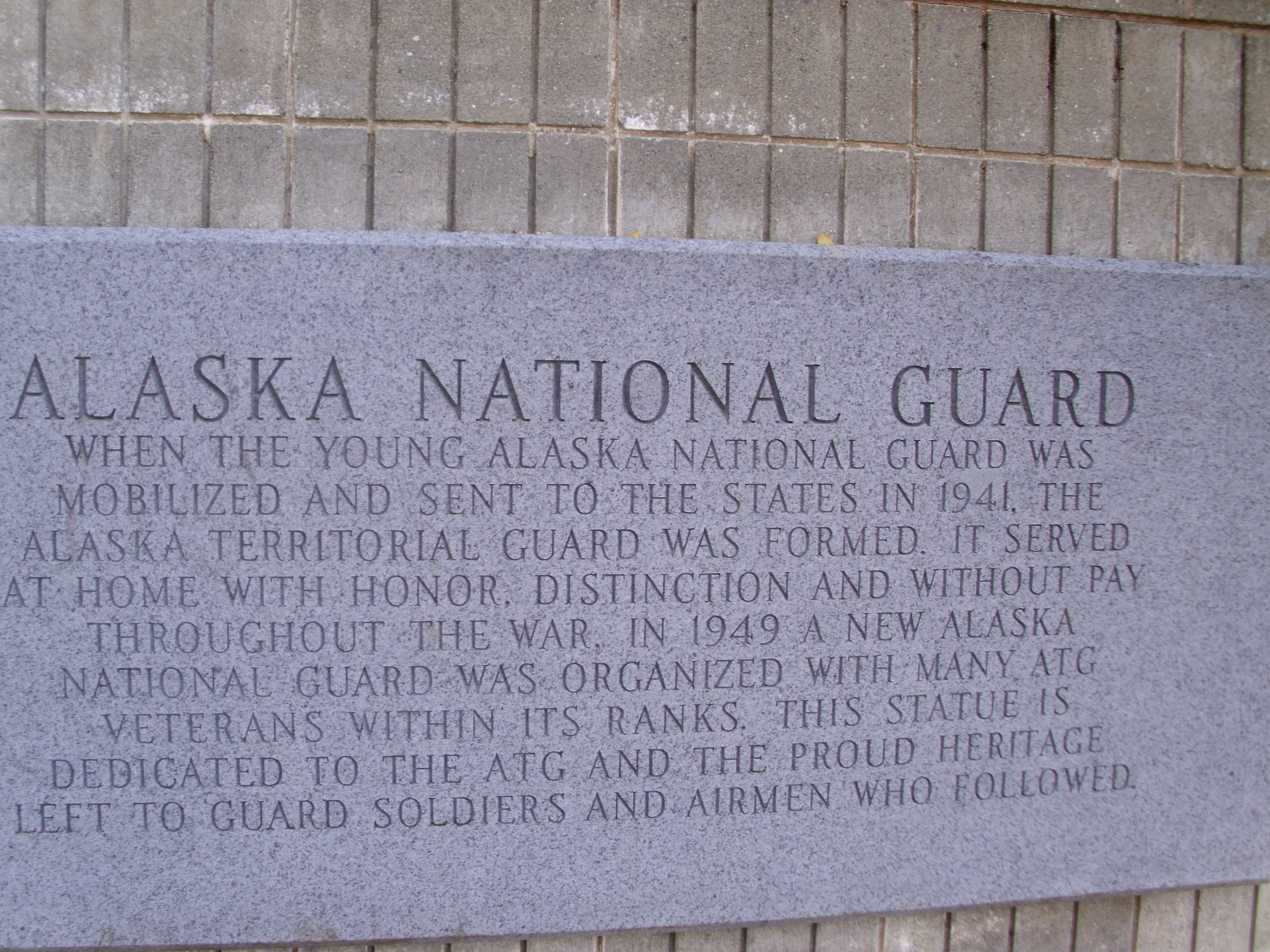
Plaque honoring the ATG and the Alaska National Guard at the Alaska Veterans Memorial

Several former members of the ATG were instrumental in achieving Alaska Statehood. In 1958 three of the eleven members of the Alaska Statehood Committee were former ATG members. Seven delegates to the Alaska Constitutional Committee had served with the ATG. Both are listed below under Noted ATG Members.

The ATG actively and successfully promoted racial integration in the US Army by proving the worth of native Americans as soldiers within US military forces much as the Navajo, Comanche and Choctaw Code talkers did elsewhere during World War II.

ATG members were also active in promoting racial equality in their communities, insisting on equal treatment for natives and whites alike at movie theaters, restaurants and other public facilities.

== Later developments ==
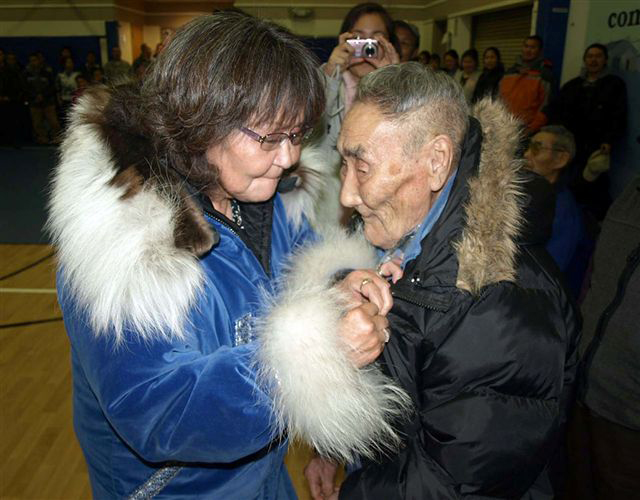
Discharge ceremony, 2008

In 2000 Alaska's senior US Senator, Ted Stevens, sponsored a bill ordering the Secretary of Defense to issue honorable discharges to all Americans who served in the Alaska Territorial Guard (ATG). Stevens was himself a World War II veteran, flying with the Army Air Corps in China. The bill was signed into law by President Bill Clinton that August.

Because of disagreement as to whose responsibility it was to seek the ATG veterans out to inform them of the new law, and because of the advanced age and geographic isolation of many of the veterans, a temporary position, filled by retired colonel Robert A. "Bob" Goodman, was created in the Alaska Department of Military and Veterans Affairs in 2003, to find and assist as many former ATG members as possible. After the position ended that October, Bob continued the work, on his own and funded out of his own pocket. In support of this effort, he founded the Alaska Territorial Guard Organization (ATGO), a 501(c)(3) non-profit, in April 2006. He continues the work with the help of a small paid and volunteer ATGO staff. To date, they have found and helped obtain an honorable discharge for about 150 ATG members. They estimate there are several hundred more yet to be found.

Goodman and the ATGO have pleaded the case of the ATG members and spouses with US senators, two Alaskan governors, most of the state legislature, the Anchorage Assembly, as well as numerous Alaska Native Regional Corporations and other corporations and foundations.

== Timeline ==
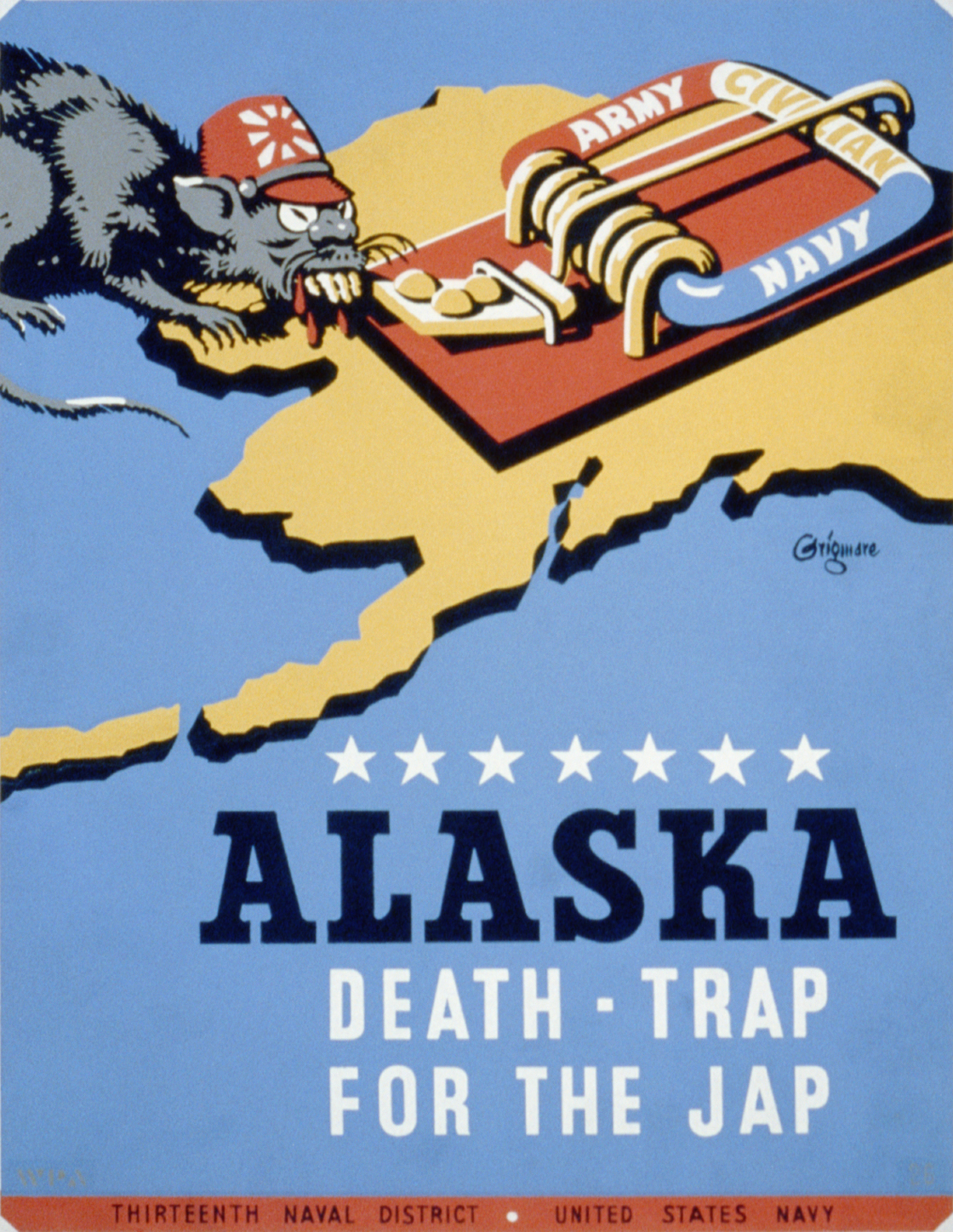
US government poster from World War II

- 1931 – The Imperial Japanese Army sets a false pretense and uses it to invade northeast China, confirming its intent to dominate the Asia-Pacific region.
- 1935 – Billy Mitchell declares Alaska strategically important, goes unheeded by US military leadership. Earlier, Mitchell was court-martialled for advocating the value of military airpower.
- 1937 – The US Army officially declines a request for an air base in Alaska.
- 1939 – Ernest Gruening is appointed Alaska territorial governor by his friend, US President Franklin D. Roosevelt (FDR). Gruening gets four National Guard units organized in the Alaska Territory.
- 1940, March – A bill for an air base in Alaska fails to pass in the US House.
- 1940, April – Hitler invades Norway and Denmark (whose territory includes Greenland).
- 1940, May – US Congress approves an air base in Alaska, to help counter any Nazi bases built in Greenland.
- 1941, March – Marvin Marston is commissioned at the Pentagon as a major with orders to Alaska.
- Mid-1941 – Gruening seeks a new guard organization for Alaska, anticipating the reassignment of the Alaska National Guard.
- 1941, August – The US Army reassigns Alaska National Guard soldiers away from Alaska, leaving the state with no military reserves or Home Guard.
- 1941, December 7 – The Imperial Japanese Navy bombs the US at Pearl Harbor, Hawaii, sinking most of the US Pacific Fleet. Soldiers' families are ordered evacuated from Alaska.
- 1942, Feb-Mar – A Japanese Navy reconnaissance unit is filmed making detailed surveys of the Alaska coastline. Japanese crewmen (enemy combatants) came ashore and questioned the locals about the area.
- 1942, March – Major Marston realizes the practicality of a 'tundra army' to defend the entire Alaskan coast.
- 1942, March – Japanese aircraft are sighted over Saint Lawrence Island.
- 1942, Mar/April – Major Marston presents a formal plan for the defense of Alaska shoreline.
- 1942, June – Japanese forces raid Dutch Harbor and take control of Attu, Kiska and Adak.
- 1942, June – The Alaska Command assigns Major Marston and Captain Carl Schreibner as military aides to Governor Gruening. Gruening and Marston soon embark on a trip to form the first units of the new Alaska Territorial Guard.
- 1942 – Major Marston (then known as Muktuk after an eating contest with a village headman) opts to make an ATG recruiting run by dogsled when a promised plane fails to show up.
- 1943, January – Major Marston completes his circuit around the Seward Peninsula by dogsled during the coldest winter in 25 years. Living by native methods, he continues to travel the Arctic through 1945.
- 1945, August – VJ Day, the Empire of Japan surrenders.
- 1947 – The Alaska Territorial Guard is disbanded.
- 1966 – The State of Alaska awards a medal to all ATG members.
- 2000 – Senator Ted Stevens' (R-AK) bill granting ATG members full veteran status is passed into law. Little is done to find and inform surviving ATG members and spouses, many of whom relocated numerous times in the intervening 53 years.
- 2003 – Robert A. "Bob" Goodman, Colonel (Retired), Alaska Air National Guard, takes up the task of finding as many former ATG members as possible, to help them apply for recognition as US veterans.
- 2006 – Goodman founds the Alaska Territorial Guard Organization, a 501(c)(3) non-profit, to support his efforts on behalf of all former ATG members. To date, they have found and helped gain approval for about 150 ATG veterans.

== Notable members ==
- Robert Atwood – Editor and publisher of the Anchorage Times, ATG lieutenant, Statehood Committee chair
- William A. Egan – territorial and state representative, ATG corporal, Constitutional Convention president, state governor
- Otto W. Geist – Pioneer Alaskan archaeologist, promoter of Alaskan artist Florence Nupok Malewotkuk, ATG major and quartermaster. Namesake of the University of Alaska Museum's main building.
- Ernest Gruening – Friend of FDR, territorial governor, ATG founder, Statehood Committee member, US Senator
- Magnus Colcord "Rusty" Heurlin – WPA artist, ATG lieutenant, famed Alaskan artist, first art teacher at the University of Alaska Fairbanks, influenced fellow artist Fred Machetanz
- * Percy Ipalook – Inupiaq native, ATG chaplain, territorial and state legislator, Statehood Committee member
- Marvin "Muktuk" Marston, Major, US Army – ATG organizer of Western Alaska, Constitutional Convention delegate, author of the book Men of the Tundra: Alaska Eskimos at War on the ATG, published in 1969
- Frank Peratrovich – Tlingit native; ATG captain; mayor; territorial and state representative; senator and senate president; Statehood Committee member; Constitutional Convention first vice president
- Peter Reader – ATG member, Constitutional Convention delegate
- Laura Beltz Wright – ATG member, best sharpshooter in her company, shooting 98% bullseyes, former Queen of Fairbanks

== See also ==
- List of former United States special operations units
- Shadow Wolves
