= List of White Alice Communications System sites =

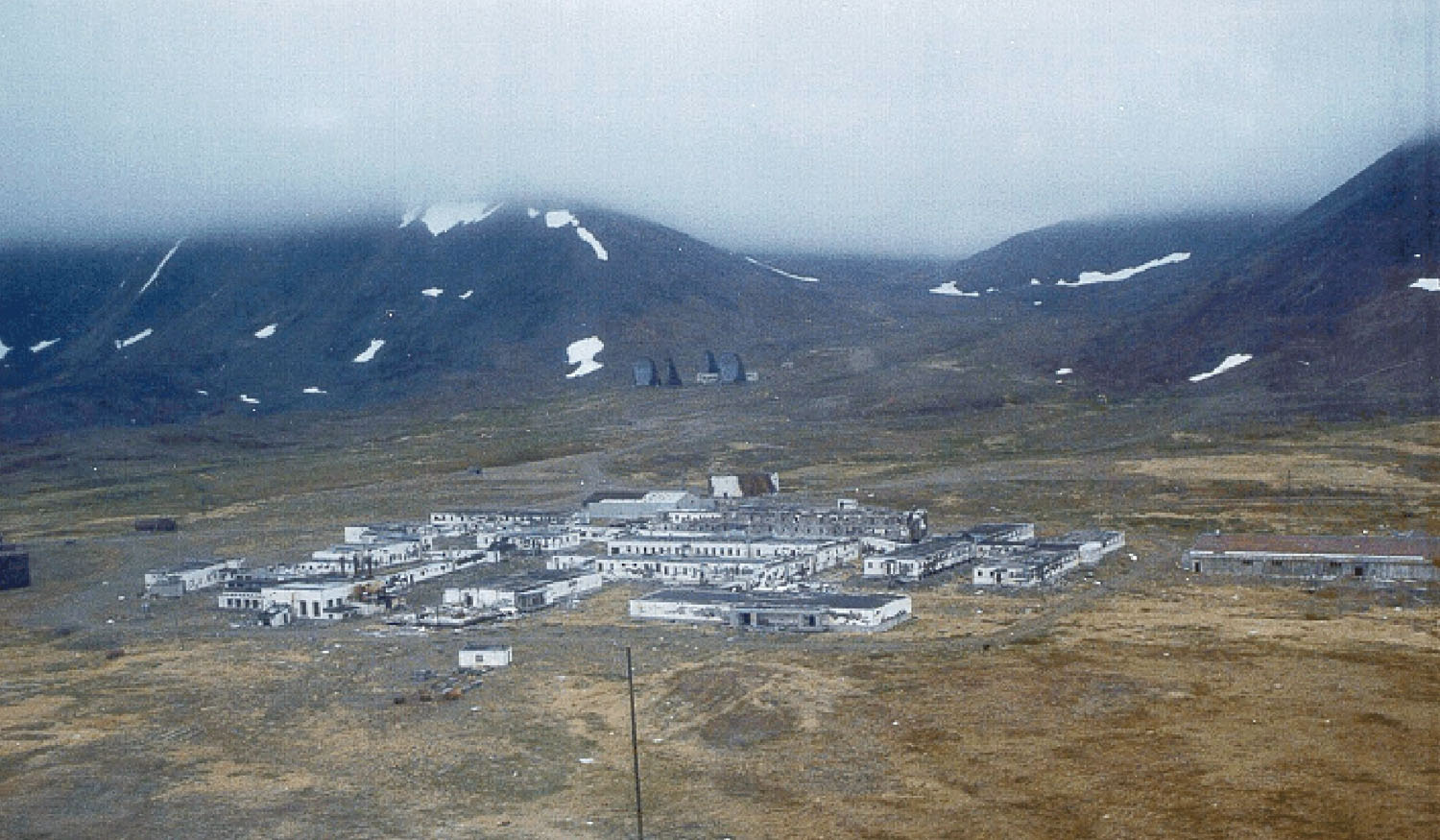
The former Northeast Cape Air Force Station on St. Lawrence Island. The remains of the station were demolished in 2003.

This is a list of White Alice Communications System sites. The White Alice Communications System (WACS) was a United States Air Force telecommunication link system constructed in Alaska during the Cold War. It featured tropospheric scatter links and line-of-sight microwave radio links.

== Original White Alice installations ==
These sites were part of the initial White Alice system and connected Aircraft Control and Warning (AC&W) sites with central command and control facilities. The Boswell Bay to Neklasson Lake link was both the first and last operational link in the White Alice system, serving from 1956 to 1985.

=== Tropospheric scatter sites ===
Location	Operational	Colocated with	Coordinates	Notes
Aniak, Alaska	1958–1979	N/A	61°34′58″N 159°35′33″W	In flight path for Aniak Airport and antennas were painted with a red and white checkerboard pattern.
Anvil Mountain, Alaska	1958–1978	N/A	64°33′52″N 165°22′25″W	7½ km (4.7 mi.) north of Nome, Alaska. Last intact existing site 2016.*
Bear Creek, Alaska	1958?-1979?	N/A	65°10′49″N 152°13′22″W	Stand-alone site with a 5,200 sq ft (480 m^{2}) dormitory and a 7,200 sq ft (670 m^{2}) equipment and power building approximately six miles northeast of Tanana, Alaska
Bethel, Alaska	1958–1979	Former AC&W site	60°44′36″N 161°39′58″W	Originally six antennas. Last antenna demolished in August 2011.
Big Mountain, Alaska	1957–1979	N/A	59°23′25″N 155°13′39″W	Demolished 2003–2005
Boswell Bay, Alaska	1956–1985	N/A	60°25′01″N 146°09′12″W	Demolished 1987 after extensive historical documentation.
Fort Yukon, Alaska	1958-UKN	709th AC&W	Est.66°34′10″N 145°14′26″W	120 ft antennas added in 1962 to Barter Island. Demolished Summer of 1999.
Granite Mountain, Alaska	1957–1976	N/A	65°25′55″N 161°14′9″W	Lease to Alascom 1976. 4×60 ft, 2× 30 ft (9.1 m) dishes
Indian Mountain, Alaska		AC&W / Long Range RADAR	66°04′07″N 153°41′23″W	Top camp was around 4,200 ft (1,300 m) and 10 miles (16 km) away from bottom camp, which contained airfield and Geodesic dome support buildings.
Kalakaket Creek, Alaska	1957-	N/A	64°25′48″N 156°50′19″W	Originally Tropo only, TD-2 microwave link added later.
King Salmon, Alaska	1957–1979	King Salmon Air Force Station/LRR	58°42′19″N 156°40′08″W	
Kotzebue, Alaska	1957–1979	AC&W station / FAA	66°50′34″N 162°36′13″W	3 miles south of Kotzebue
Cape Lisburne, Alaska	1957–1979	AC&W / Long range radar site	68°52′11″N 166°08′56″W	Northernmost and only seasonal WACS, closed during winter. A $6.5 million composite building was constructed in 1970.
Middleton Island, Alaska	1956–1985	AC&W station / FAA	59°27′36″N 146°18′21″W	30 ft parabolic dish
Cape Newenham, Alaska	1958–1979	Originally AC&W, now Long Range RADAR	Est.58°38′46″N 162°01′48″W	Revamped in 1974 for $6 Million. Demolished by 1987.
North River, Alaska	1958–1978	Near a former AC&W site	63°53′00″N 160°31′50″W	Demolished 1993–1995
Northeast Cape, Alaska	1958-	AC&W	63°17′34″N 168°42′05″W	A very remote site, demolished in 2003 for $10.5 million. The White Alice site was located about 1/2 mile from the USAF AC&W site.
Pillar Mountain, Kodiak, Alaska	1957–1979	N/A	Est.57°47′19″N 152°26′12″W	Dismantled in 1997
Cape Romanzof, Alaska	1958–1979	AC&W / Minimally attended RADAR	61°46′53″N 165°57′04″W	Upper camp was accessible via tramway and by road. The AC&W site was located in the crater of an extinct volcano. The White Alice site was perched on, I believe, the west rim of the crater.
Sparrevohn, Alaska	1957–1979	AC&W	61°06′22″N 155°36′36″W	Demolished prior to 1987. Very costly construction, dangerous runway. Long Range RADAR still at site.
Tatalina, Alaska	1957–1979	AC&W site	62°55′41″N 156°01′30″W	Tram and road used to reach top camp. WACS located east of RADARs in Top camp.
Tin City, Alaska	1958–1975	AC&W/Long range radar	65°34′58″N 167°56′25″W	Located on Cape Mountain. Tram used to reach top camp. WACS located on a 600-foot plateau 2 miles east of the peak and radar.

=== Microwave sites ===
Location	Operational	Colocated with	Coordinates	Notes
Clam Gulch, Alaska	1957-	N/A	60°12′51″N 151°24′52.4″W	TD-2 Microwave, Acquired by Alascom operating in 1987
Naptowne, Alaska		N/A	60°31′45.9″N 150°35′00.3″W	
Rabbit Creek, Alaska		N/A	61°05′20.8″N 149°44′09.1″W	
R1-N a.k.a. Anchorage	1956-	Located on Elmendorf Air Force Base	61°15′38.2″N 149°49′52.2″W	Unattended TD-2 microwave link
Soldotna, Alaska		N/A	60°31′55.1″N 151°04′59.6″W	
Starisky, Alaska		N/A	59°52′51.6″N 151°47′10.4″W	

=== Dual Tropo/Micro ===
Location	Operational	Colocated with	Coordinates	Notes
Neklasson Lake, Alaska	1956–1985	N/A	61°37′10.1″N 149°15′23″W	Boswell Bay to Neklasson Lake was the last operational link
Diamond Ridge, Alaska	1957-	FAA?/Homer, Alaska	59°40′14.6″N 151°34′07″W	Acquired by Alascom, Micro in use / Tropo removed as of 1987
Pedro Dome, Alaska	1958-?	N/A	65°02′2.5″N 147°30′07″W	Tropo was demolished prior to 1986. Micro still operated by AT&T.

Note: There were Tropo Billboards at Soldotna (co-located with the TD2) and at Fire Island, as well. Also, There was a TD-2 site at what is now the Civil Air Patrol Wing Headquarters on Elmendorf AFB—it was called R2N. And, there is a TD-2 site at Rabbit Creek, that was originally, and briefly, called R1S, which linked into the TD-2 site at Naptowne.

- Est. indicates location unclear from USGS topo

== The BMEWS Network ==
The second segment of White Alice was a pair of TD-2 microwave radio links that supported the Ballistic Missile Early Warning System (BMEWS) at Clear Air Force Station. This section provided two routes from Alaska to NORAD in Colorado, for this reason it was also known as the Rearward Communications System. The A Route went down the southeast coast of Alaska to a submarine cable and the B Route went east into Canada. Some of the systems were colocated with previous sites.

=== A Route ===
Aurora, Black Rapids, Boswell Bay, Cape Yakataga, Clear, Donnelly Dome, Duncan Canal, Glennallen, Harding Lake, Hoonah, McCallum, Murphy Dome, Neklasson Lake, Ocean Cape, Paxson, Pedro Dome, Sawmill, Sheep Mountain, Smuggler Cove, Tahneta Pass, Tolsona

=== B Route ===
Beaver Creek, Canyon Creek, Cathedral, Delta Junction, Gerstle River, Gold King Creek, Knob Ridge, Tok Junction

== Project Stretchout sites ==
Project Stretchout began in 1959 and finished in the mid-1960s. It was the extension of White Alice to the Alaska Peninsula including the Aleutian DEW Line system.

Location	Operational	Colocated with	Coordinates	Notes
Cold Bay, Alaska		DEW Line	Est.55°15′49″N 162°53′08″W	About $8 million combined cost for Cold Bay and Cape Sarichef
Driftwood Bay, Alaska		DEW Line	Est.53°58′12″N 166°52′46″W	
Nikolski, Alaska		DEW Line, Navy, FAA	Est.52°58′12″N 168°51′20″W	
Port Heiden, Alaska		DEW Line	Est.56°58′38″N 158°39′09″W	$3.5 million
Port Moller, Alaska		DEW Line	Est.55°58′41″N 160°30′01″W	$4.4 million to construct.
Cape Sarichef, Alaska	late 1950s to the mid-1970s	DEW line / LORAN station / Airfield	Est.54°35′37″N 164°55′06″W	Built atop a levelled cinder cone

== Project Bluegrass sites ==
Extension of the White Alice system from Nikolski to Shemya near the end of the Aleutian Islands. Both shots were over 340 miles (550 km), requiring large 120 ft (37 m) antennas and 50 kW transmitters. Both sites were demolished before 1987. In addition to the Aleutian Island extension, Project Bluegrass also included a 50 kW shot from Fort Yukon to Barter Island to connect the northern DEW line to the White Alice system.

Location	Operational	Colocated with	Coordinates	Notes
Shemya Island, Alaska	Late-60s to late-70s	AC&W / FAA	52°43′25″N 174°08′21″E	Shemya to Adak shot was 393 miles (632 km)
Adak, Alaska	Late-60s to late-70s	Navy and others	Est.51°54′25″N 176°38′26″W	Adak to Nikolski shot was 341 miles (549 km).

== See also ==
- Radio propagation
