= Mount Geist =

Mountain in Alaska, United States

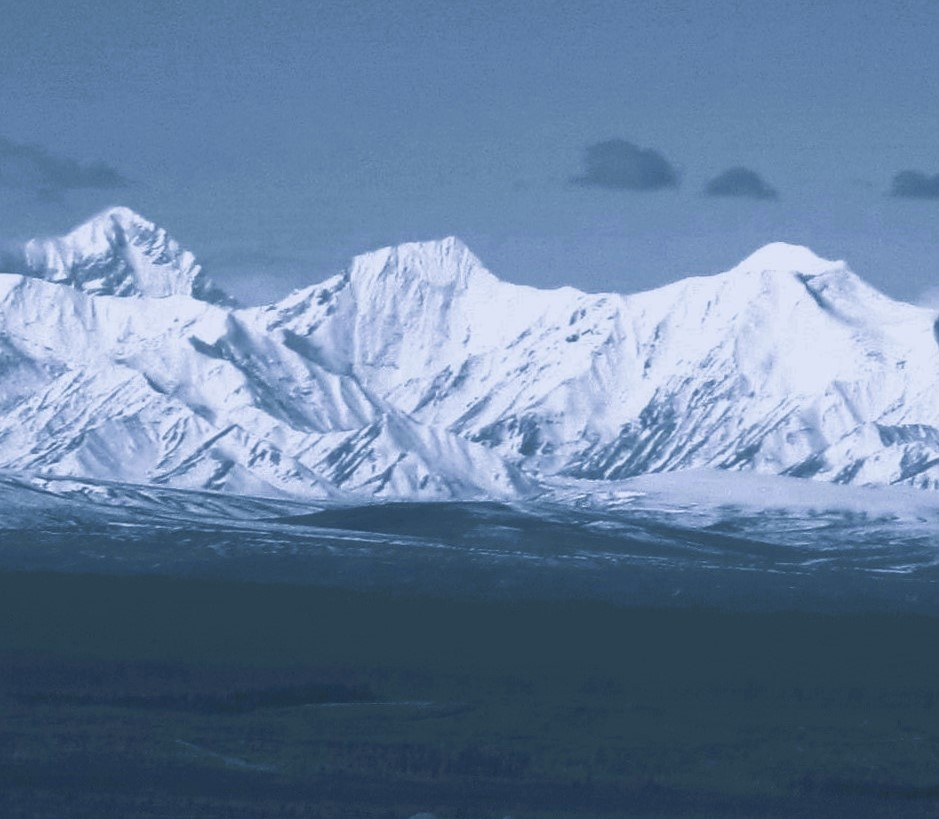
- Northeast aspect, centered (Mt. Balchen left and Mt. Skarland right)

Highest point
- Elevation: 10,716 ft (3,266 m)
- Prominence: 1,663 ft (507 m)
- Parent peak: Mount Balchen (11,205 ft)
- Isolation: 1.34 mi (2.16 km)
- Coordinates: 63°38′30″N 146°52′12″W

Naming
- Etymology: Otto W. Geist

Geography
- Location within Alaska
- Interactive map of Mount Geist
- Country: United States
- State: Alaska
- Census Area: Southeast Fairbanks
- Parent range: Alaska Range; Hayes Range
- Topo map: USGS Mount Hayes C-6

Climbing
- First ascent: 1974

Mount Geist is a 10,716-foot-elevation (3,266-meter) mountain summit in Alaska, United States.

== Description ==
Mount Geist is a glaciated mountain located in the Hayes Range which is a subrange of the Alaska Range. This remote peak is situated 5.5 miles (8.9 km) west-northwest of Mount Hayes and 87 miles (140 km) south-southeast of Fairbanks. Precipitation runoff from the mountain drains north to East Fork Little Delta River → Little Delta River → Tanana River. Topographic relief is significant as the summit rises 3,500 feet (1,067 m) above the Hayes Glacier in 0.6 mile (1 km). The first ascent of the summit was made on May 2, 1974, by Dusan Jagersky and Bill Sumner via the Northeast Face.

== Etymology ==
The mountain was named by Troy L. Péwé for Otto W. Geist (1888–1963), University of Alaska, pioneer researcher in paleontology, archeology, and glaciology in Alaska, whose glacier work was centered near this area. The mountain's toponym was officially adopted in 1965 by the U.S. Board on Geographic Names. Geist worked with Ivar Skarland who also has an adjacent peak named after him (Mt. Skarland). Geist and Skarland were personal friends of Bernt Balchen, who also had an adjacent peak (Mt. Balchen) named after him.

== Climate ==
Based on the Köppen climate classification, Mount Geist is located in a tundra climate zone with long, cold, snowy winters, and cool summers. This climate supports the Hayes and Gillam glaciers surrounding this peak. Winter temperatures can drop below −20 °F (−29 °C) with wind chill factors below −30 °F (−34 °C) The months May through June offer the most favorable weather for climbing or viewing.

== Gallery ==
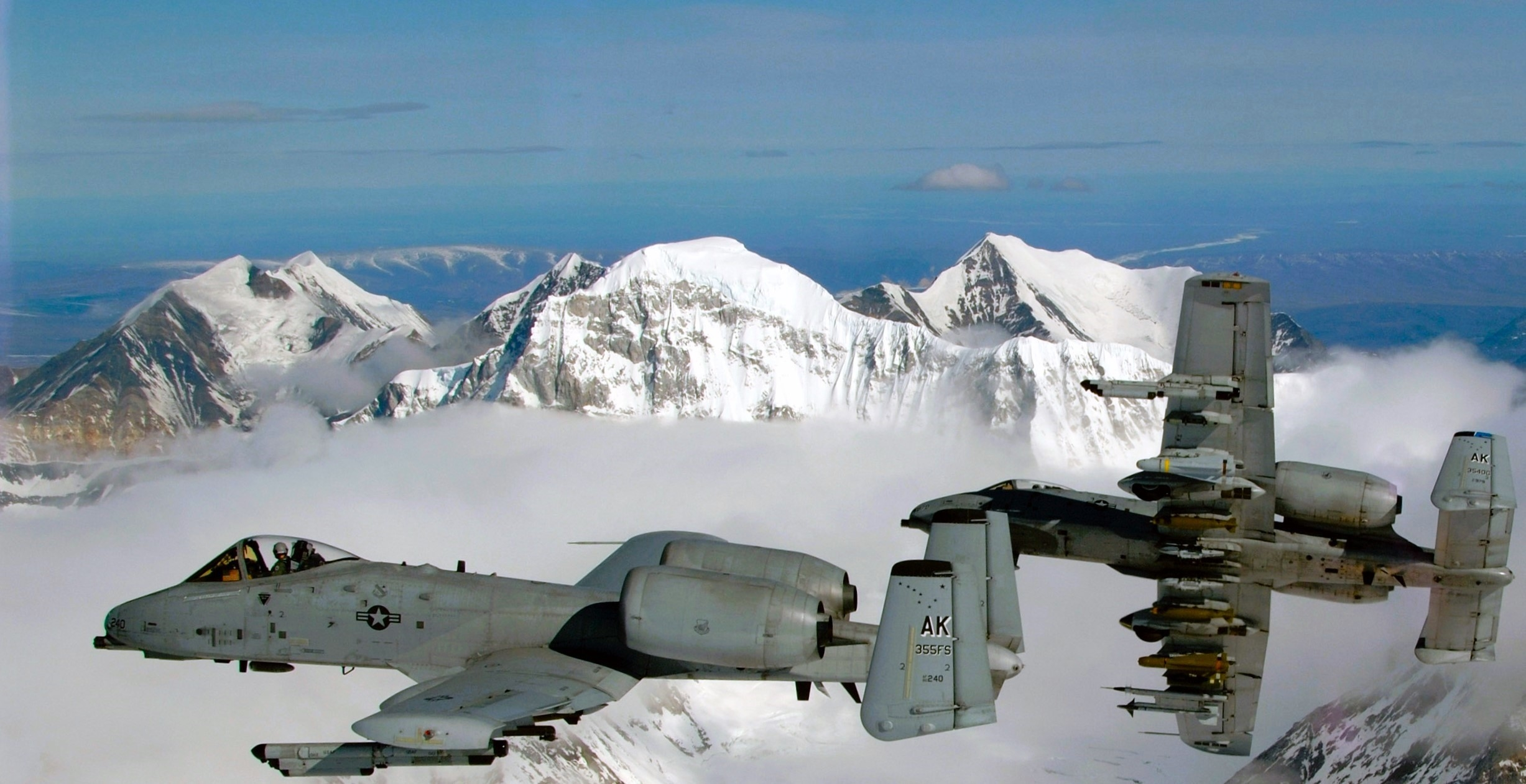
South aspect of Mount Balchen centered. Mount Giddings to left, Mt. Skarland to right, and part of Mt. Geist behind Balchen.

== See also ==
- List of mountain peaks of Alaska
- Geography of Alaska
