= Laura Beltz Wright =

Alaska Territorial Guard member and parka designer

Laura Beltz Wright (1909–1996), Inupiaq, was born in Candle, Alaska. From 1942 to 1947, she was one of 23 women members of the Alaska Territorial Guard (ATG) during World War II, which enlisted Alaska Natives as volunteers to patrol in case of a Japanese invasion. As a private in the ATG, she was best known as a sharp shooter, and also delivered mail. Later in life Beltz Wright became known for designing parkas.

== World War II ==
Beltz Wright was part of the Alaska Territorial Guard (ATG) during World War II, which patrolled the coastline to provide intelligence on any enemy operations nearby and rescued any downed airmen. While most women were typically nurses, Beltz Wright stepped outside traditional norms and was a sharpshooter. In addition to her time with the ATG, Beltz Wright also delivered mail by dog team, skis and/or sled.

== Design ==
Beltz Wright would be known for designing Alaska parkas later in life. In 1952, when she began designing parkas, she received a patent on a velveteen parka called the "Wright Alaskan Parky, an original winter parka." The parkas incorporate traditional Alaska Native designs in them. Some of her parkas are in the collection of the Smithsonian's National Museum of the American Indian. Notable celebrity clients who wore her parkas included Elvis Presley, Willie Nelson, Ricky Nelson, Shirley Jones and Burl Ives. Her granddaughter, Sheila Ezelle, purchased Laura Wright Alaskan Parkys in 1985 and currently owns and operates a storefront in Anchorage, Alaska.

== Recognition ==
It wasn't until 2000 that ATG members received veteran status. In 2017 Beltz Wright's family accepted her discharge papers from the government. In 2020, Beltz Wright was recognized by the U.S. Senate for her accomplishments and contributions during WWII to break gender barriers. In her obituary, it is mentioned that she was listed in Who's Who of American Women in 1967 and nominated for Alaska Mother of the Year award in 1968.

== Personal life ==
In 1926, Laura Beltz married John Allan Hagberg and they operated a gold mine together. Together, they had six children. After Hagberg died in 1948, she married Dallas A. Wright in 1951. Wright died in 1981. During this time, Beltz Wright also served as a midwife for her community.
