= House at 2 Nichols Street =

Historic house in Massachusetts, United States

- U.S. National Register of Historic Places
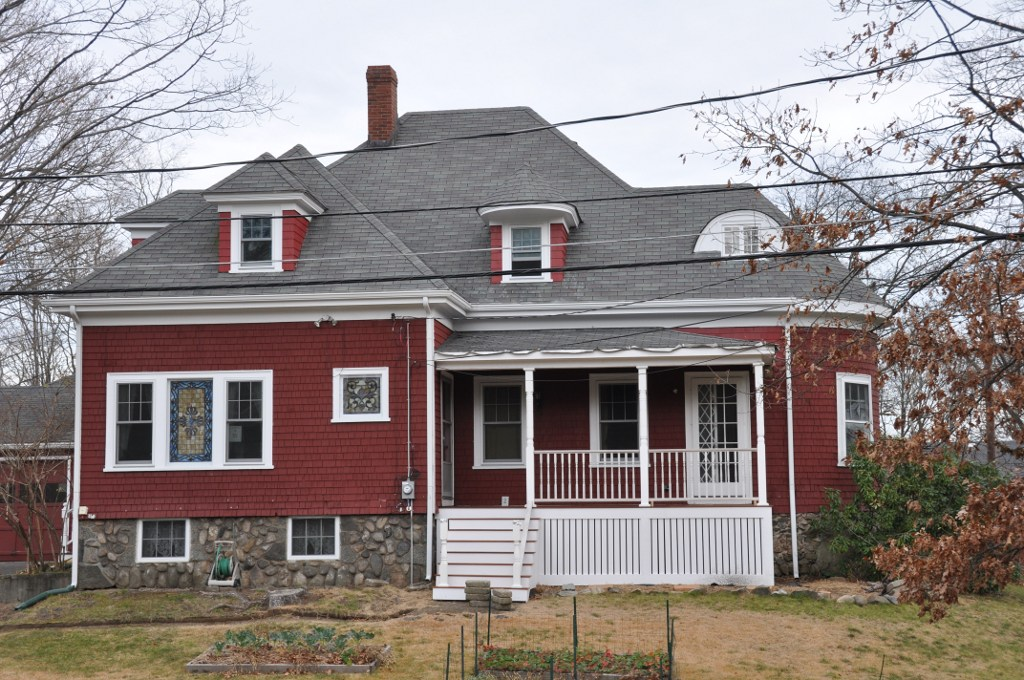

- Location within Massachusetts Location within the United States
- Location: 2 Nichols St., Wakefield, Massachusetts
- Coordinates: 42°30′21″N 71°5′2″W
- Built: 1890
- Architect: Heurlin, Berndt
- Architectural style: Shingle Style
- MPS: Wakefield MRA
- NRHP reference No.: 89000740
- Added to NRHP: July 06, 1989

The House at 2 Nichols Street in Wakefield, Massachusetts, is a well-preserved, architecturally eclectic house built in the 1890s. The 1 1/2-story frame house has elements of the Tudor Revival, Queen Anne, and Shingle styles, and is one of two identical houses built by local builder Berndt Heurlin. It has a hip roof, but transverse gables, one of which has a rounded bay, giving it a Queen Anne feel. The foundation exterior is fieldstone, and there are several stained glass windows.

The house was listed on the National Register of Historic Places in 1989.

The house was also the childhood home of the renowned Swedish-American artist, Magnus Colcord Heurlin (July 5, 1895 – March 10, 1986). Colcord Heurlin attended the Fenway School of Illustration in Boston, where he studied under Harold Mathews Brett (1880–1955), the director of the newly opened school. Heurlin began illustrating covers for pulp magazines in the 1920s and 1930s and later joined the WPA Federal Arts Project, creating two murals for the Bedford Elementary School in Westport, Connecticut. But he is best known for his vivid, oil-pastel depictions of Alaskan natives and early settler life in northern Alaska.

== See also ==
- National Register of Historic Places listings in Wakefield, Massachusetts
- National Register of Historic Places listings in Middlesex County, Massachusetts
- Magnus Colcord Heurlin
