= Mount Skarland =

Mountain in Alaska, United States

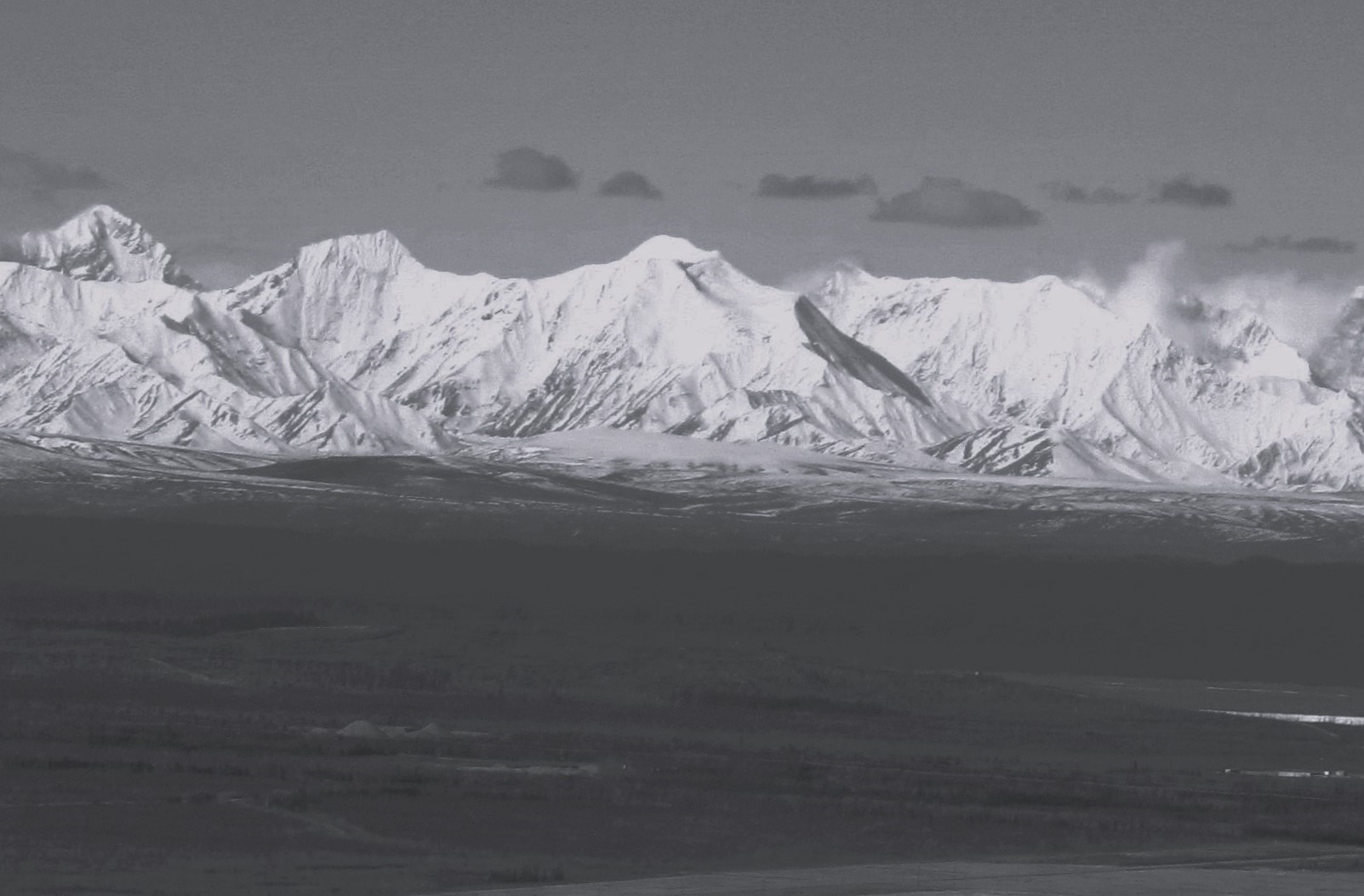
- Northeast aspect, centered (Mt. Geist left and Mt. Balchen far left)

Highest point
- Elevation: 10,375 ft (3,162 m)
- Prominence: 1,122 ft (342 m)
- Parent peak: Mount Geist (10,720 ft)
- Isolation: 2.32 mi (3.73 km)
- Coordinates: 63°40′17″N 146°50′27″W

Naming
- Etymology: Ivar Skarland

Geography
- Location within Alaska
- Interactive map of Mount Skarland
- Country: United States
- State: Alaska
- Census Area: Southeast Fairbanks Census Area
- Parent range: Alaska Range; Hayes Range
- Topo map: USGS Mount Hayes C-6

Climbing
- First ascent: 1970

Mount Skarland is a 10,375-foot-elevation (3,162-meter) mountain summit in Alaska, United States.

== Description ==
Mount Skarland is a glaciated mountain located in the Hayes Range which is a subrange of the Alaska Range. This remote peak is situated 5.5 miles (8.9 km) northwest of Mount Hayes and 85 miles (137 km) south-southeast of Fairbanks. Precipitation runoff from the mountain drains into Hayes Creek and Whistler Creek which flow north to East Fork Little Delta River → Little Delta River → Tanana River. Topographic relief is significant as the summit rises 4,875 feet (1,486 m) above the Hayes Glacier in two miles (3.2 km). The first ascent of the summit was made on April 19, 1970, by Theodore Nicolai, Ed Johann, Terry Simonitch, and Price Zimmermann via the Northeast Ridge.

== Etymology ==
The mountain was named by Troy L. Péwé for Dr. Ivar Skarland (1899–1965), head of the Department of Anthropology of the University of Alaska at the time of his death. He did pioneering work in anthropology and archeology in much of Alaska, including the Alaska Range. The mountain's toponym was officially adopted in 1965 by the U.S. Board on Geographic Names. Dr. Skarland worked with Otto W. Geist who also has an adjacent peak named after him (Mt. Geist). Also adjacent is Mt. Giddings, named for J. Louis Giddings, another archaeologist at the University of Alaska who died around the same time. Skarland and Geist were personal friends of Bernt Balchen, who also had a nearby peak (Mt. Balchen) named after him.

== Climate ==
Based on the Köppen climate classification, Mount Skarland is located in a tundra climate zone with long, cold, snowy winters, and cool summers. This climate supports the Hayes and Gillam glaciers surrounding this peak. Winter temperatures can drop below −20 °F with wind chill factors below −30 °F. The months May through June offer the most favorable weather for climbing or viewing.

== Gallery ==
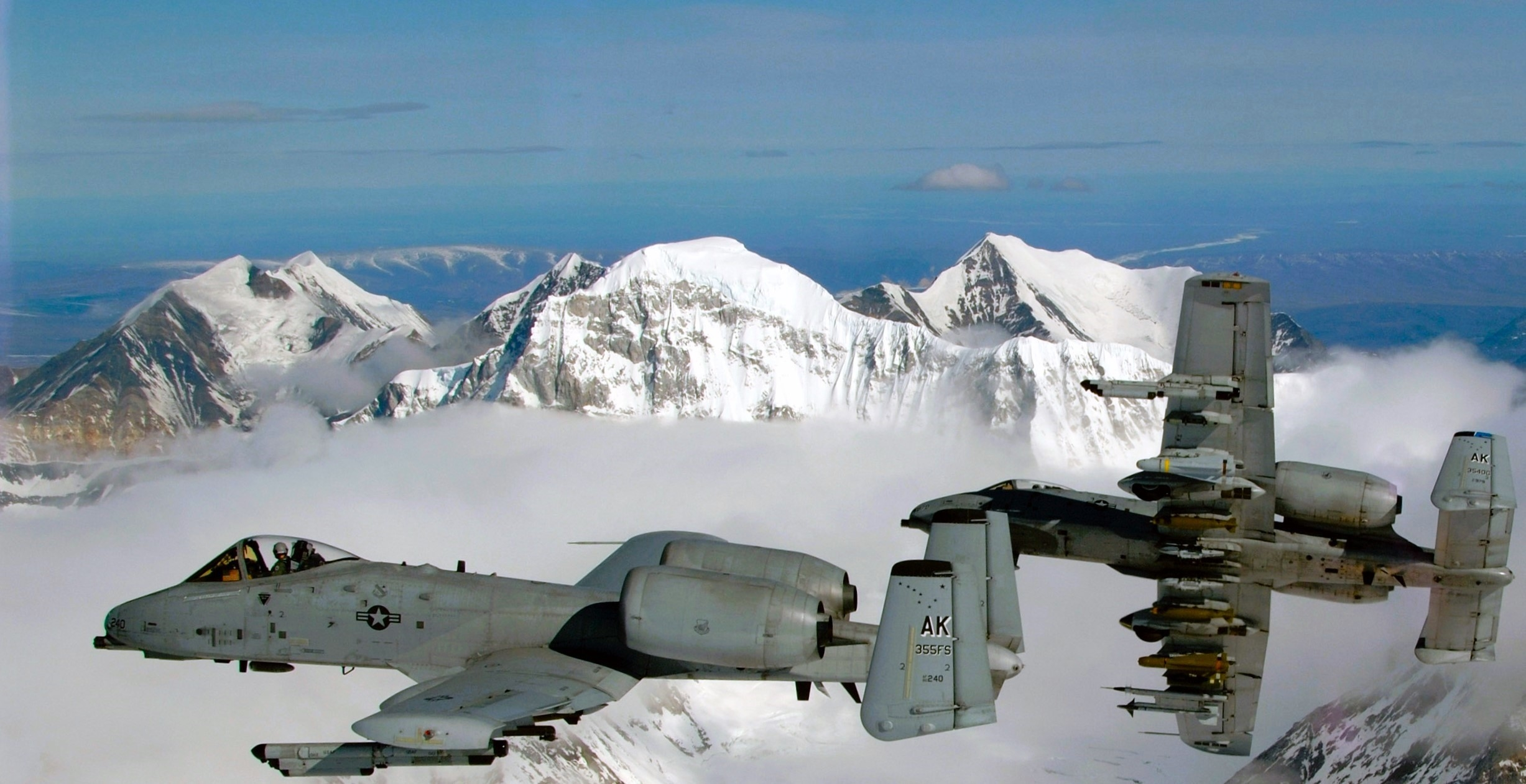
South aspect of Mt. Balchen centered. Mt. Giddings to left, Mt. Skarland to right, and part of Mt. Geist behind Balchen.

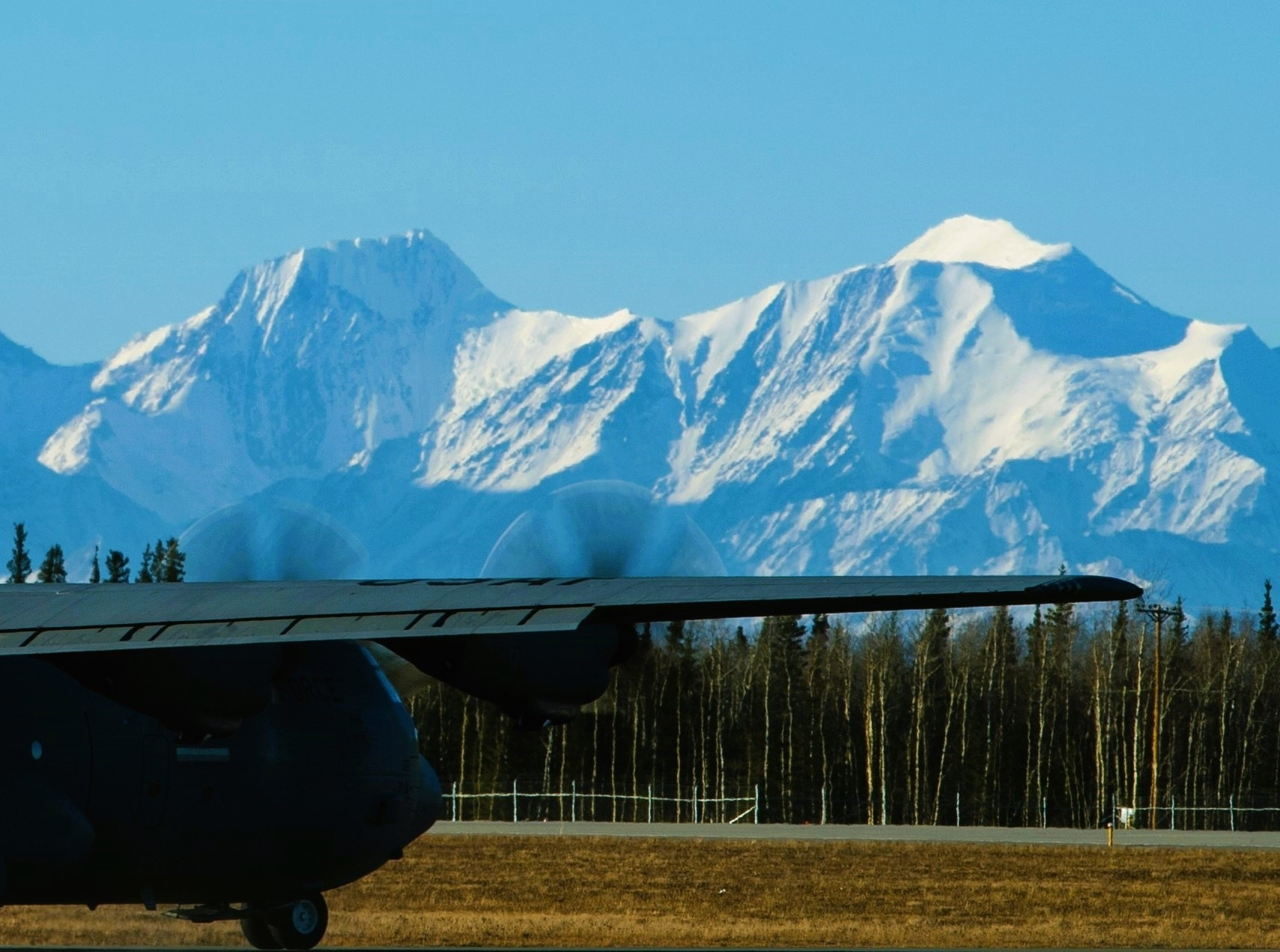
Mt. Geist (left), and Mt. Skarland (right)

== See also ==
- List of mountain peaks of Alaska
- Geography of Alaska
