= Magnus Colcord Heurlin =

American artist

Magnus Colcord "Rusty" Heurlin (July 5, 1895 – March 10, 1986) was a Swedish-American artist best known for his pastel palette and depictions of Alaskan landscapes.

== Background ==
Magnus Colcord Heurlin was born in Christianstad, Skåne County, Sweden. He was the son of Berndt Felix Heurlin and Sophie Björklund. He was raised at the house at 2 Nichols Street in Wakefield, Massachusetts after the family returned to the U.S. from Sweden in 1896. He attended art classes conducted by Harold Matthews Brett at the Fenway School of Illustration in Boston, Massachusetts.

== Career ==
Heurlin first came to Alaska in 1916, to Valdez, traveling aboard the SS Northwestern from Seattle, Washington. He later moved to Utqiagvik where he lived and painted, concentrating on the Inupiat, creating many works depicting whaling and hunting. He joined the U.S. Navy in 1917 and left the territory during World War I, serving in France. Because of his extensive knowledge of armaments he attained a job as Admiral Plunkett's orderly in the naval railroad batteries.

After the war, Heurlin lived for many years in Westport, Connecticut, where he began his professional art career as an illustrator for magazines published in New York City. In the early 1930s he was selected as an artist for the WPA Arts Project in Westport's public school buildings. He returned to Alaska around 1935, and moved outside Fairbanks to the gold mining village of Ester with his wife, Anne Downer Severin (d. 1971). The artist worked on the gold dredges near Ester for the Fairbanks Exploration (FE) Company at the Independence Mine. In 1942 Heurlin became an officer in the Alaska Territorial Guard which was organized to protect Alaska from Japanese invasion. After World War II he returned to his cabin in Ester, where he resided until his death at age 90.

Heurlin taught the first art classes at the University of Alaska Fairbanks in the 1950s, and received an honorary doctorate from the university in 1971. He was also named to Alaska's 49ers Hall of Fame. Heurlin was known for his pastel palette and luminous skies, and influenced many later Alaska artists, such as Fred Machetanz.

== Sources ==
- Alaska Digital Archives- Rusty Heurlin
- ReviewPaintings.com
