= Peter Reader =

Delegate to the constitutional convention of Alaska

Peter L. Reader (1913 – November 6, 2002) was a delegate of the constitutional convention of Alaska. He was the only delegate to oppose statehood.

Reader was born in Grand Rapids, North Dakota. A former miner who worked in Candle and Nome, he worked as an equipment foreman for the Army Corps of Engineers during World War II.

After the war, Reader worked for the North Fork Dredging Company and the Pioneer Water Company. He served as a delegate to the Alaska Constitutional Convention in 1955 and 1956.

In 1958, Reader formed the Nome Telephone Company along with four other investors. He remained at the company until its sale in 1965.

Reader died, aged 89, in Silverdale, Washington after a lengthy illness.
