= Platinum, Alaska =

Platinum Arviiq
- City
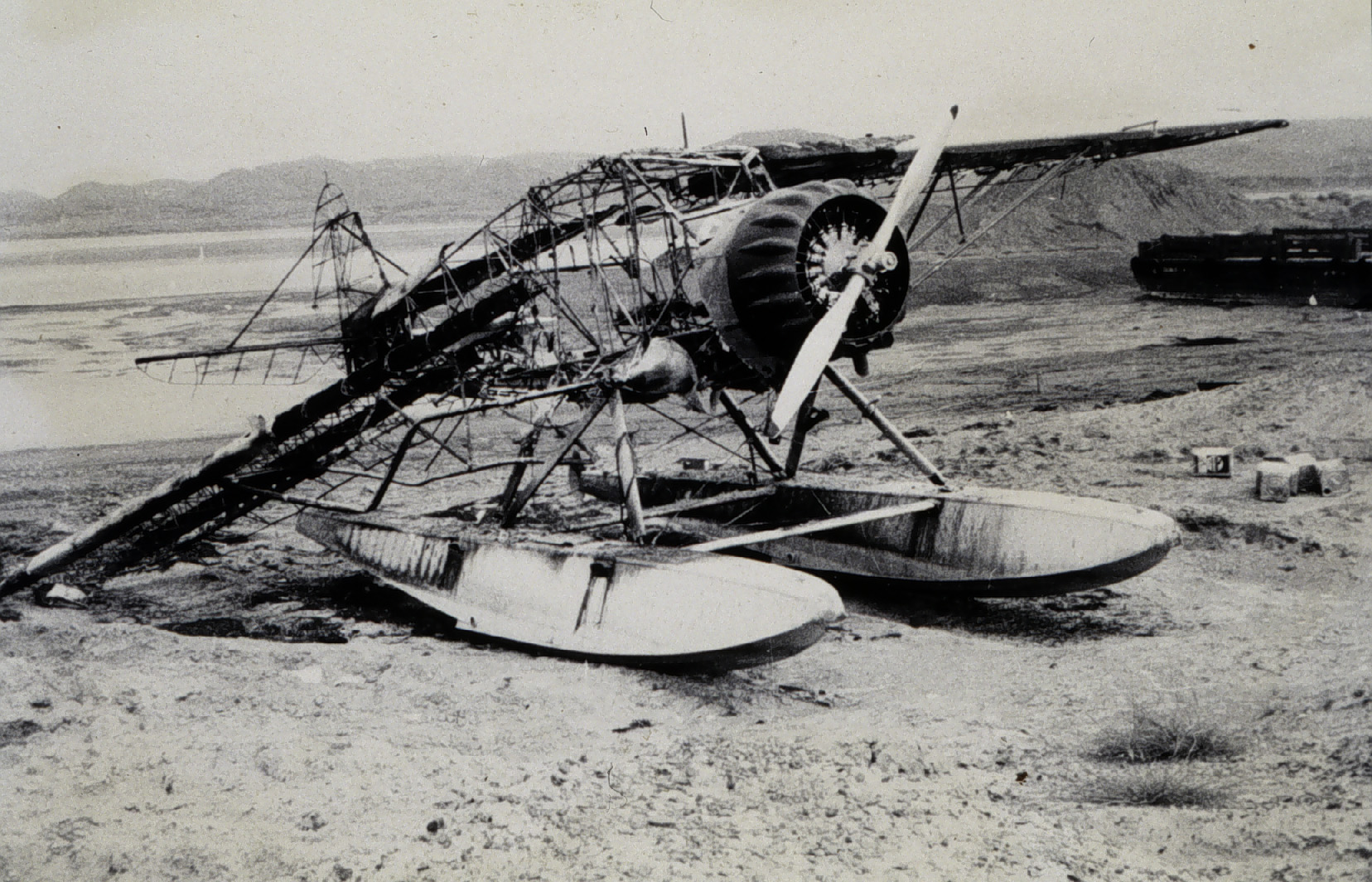
- Destroyed airplane at Platinum, 1948

- Location in Alaska
- Coordinates: 59°0′47″N 161°48′59″W
- Country: United States
- State: Alaska
- Census Area: Bethel
- Incorporated: February 13, 1975

Government
  - Mayor: Mark Moyle
  - State senator: Lyman Hoffman (D)
  - State rep.: Bryce Edgmon (I)

Area
  - Total: 47.31 sq mi (122.53 km^{2})
  - Land: 47.26 sq mi (122.41 km^{2})
  - Water: 0.046 sq mi (0.12 km^{2})
- Elevation: 13 ft (4 m)

Population (2020)
  - Total: 55
  - Density: 1.2/sq mi (0.45/km^{2})
- Time zone: UTC-9 (Alaska (AKST))
  - Summer (DST): UTC-8 (AKDT)
- ZIP codes: 99651
- Area code: 907
- FIPS code: 02-61080

Platinum (Central Yupik: Arviiq) is a city in Bethel Census Area, Alaska, United States. As of the 2020 census, Platinum had a population of 55.

== Geography ==
Platinum is located at 59°00′47″N 161°48′59″W. It is located on a spit on Goodnews Bay adjacent to the mouth of the Small River and eleven miles southwest of Goodnews and the Kilbuck Mountains.

According to the United States Census Bureau, the city has a total area of 44.7 square miles (116 km^{2}), of which, 44.6 square miles (116 km^{2}) of it is land and 0.1 square miles (0.26 km^{2}) of it (0.16%) is water.

=== Climate ===
Platinum has a subarctic climate (Dfc) with short, cool and rainy summers and long, cold winters with moderate snowfall peaking during March.

Climate data for Platinum, Alaska (1939-1964)
Month	Jan	Feb	Mar	Apr	May	Jun	Jul	Aug	Sep	Oct	Nov	Dec	Year
Record high °F (°C)	52 (11)	47 (8)	46 (8)	53 (12)	65 (18)	79 (26)	82 (28)	73 (23)	68 (20)	63 (17)	48 (9)	44 (7)	82 (28)
Mean maximum °F (°C)	38.8 (3.8)	38.4 (3.6)	38.7 (3.7)	44.3 (6.8)	57.0 (13.9)	64.6 (18.1)	69.6 (20.9)	65.3 (18.5)	60.0 (15.6)	50.5 (10.3)	41.9 (5.5)	37.5 (3.1)	70.7 (21.5)
Mean daily maximum °F (°C)	20.8 (−6.2)	22.1 (−5.5)	24.2 (−4.3)	33.6 (0.9)	44.8 (7.1)	53.8 (12.1)	57.0 (13.9)	56.5 (13.6)	51.6 (10.9)	39.8 (4.3)	28.6 (−1.9)	18.8 (−7.3)	37.6 (3.1)
Daily mean °F (°C)	14.4 (−9.8)	15.0 (−9.4)	17.4 (−8.1)	27.7 (−2.4)	39.0 (3.9)	47.7 (8.7)	51.6 (10.9)	51.7 (10.9)	46.0 (7.8)	34.6 (1.4)	23.1 (−4.9)	12.1 (−11.1)	31.7 (−0.2)
Mean daily minimum °F (°C)	8.0 (−13.3)	8.7 (−12.9)	10.7 (−11.8)	22.4 (−5.3)	33.3 (0.7)	41.6 (5.3)	46.1 (7.8)	46.9 (8.3)	40.5 (4.7)	29.3 (−1.5)	17.6 (−8.0)	5.8 (−14.6)	25.9 (−3.4)
Mean minimum °F (°C)	−18.9 (−28.3)	−18.8 (−28.2)	−11.7 (−24.3)	4.8 (−15.1)	21.7 (−5.7)	34.4 (1.3)	39.3 (4.1)	39.2 (4.0)	28.8 (−1.8)	14.7 (−9.6)	−4.0 (−20.0)	−16.9 (−27.2)	−25.8 (−32.1)
Record low °F (°C)	−34 (−37)	−32 (−36)	−26 (−32)	−11 (−24)	2 (−17)	31 (−1)	32 (0)	32 (0)	22 (−6)	6 (−14)	−21 (−29)	−29 (−34)	−34 (−37)
Average precipitation inches (mm)	1.07 (27)	1.24 (31)	1.28 (33)	0.81 (21)	1.28 (33)	1.19 (30)	2.10 (53)	4.24 (108)	3.73 (95)	2.60 (66)	1.56 (40)	1.29 (33)	22.38 (568)
Average snowfall inches (cm)	7.4 (19)	8.9 (23)	10.0 (25)	2.7 (6.9)	0.6 (1.5)	0.0 (0.0)	0.0 (0.0)	0.0 (0.0)	0.0 (0.0)	1.5 (3.8)	4.0 (10)	5.6 (14)	40.6 (103)
Average precipitation days (≥ 0.01 in)	9.8	9.6	10.8	8.5	11.0	9.6	12.9	18.6	17.7	15.0	10.2	9.3	143.0
Average snowy days (≥ 0.1 in)	5.6	6.3	7.9	3.9	0.9	0.0	0.0	0.0	0.0	2.0	3.8	5.7	36.1
Source: NOAA

== History ==
Platinum was named in the 1930s due to the platinum ore found in the area. The site was a mining boomtown by 1937 boasting a roadhouse, two trading posts and a population of 50. A post office had been established in 1935. An earlier Inuit village called Arviq had been abandoned. The town was incorporated as a city in 1975.

Ray Petersen Flying Service was awarded the exclusive contract in 1937 to fly for the Goodnews Bay platinum and iridium mine, hauling miners and company supplies out of his base at Bethel, Alaska.

During World War II, the Alaska Territorial Guard served to safeguard it against Japanese attack as it was the only source of the strategic metal platinum in the Western Hemisphere.

== Demographics ==
Historical population
Census	Pop.	Note	%±
1940	45		—
1950	72		60.0%
1960	43		−40.3%
1970	55		27.9%
1980	55		0.0%
1990	64		16.4%
2000	41		−35.9%
2010	61		48.8%
2020	55		−9.8%
U.S. Decennial Census

Platinum first appeared on the 1940 U.S. Census as an unincorporated village. It formally incorporated in 1975.

=== 2020 census ===
As of the 2020 census, Platinum had a population of 55. The median age was 29.8 years. 32.7% of residents were under the age of 18 and 10.9% of residents were 65 years of age or older. For every 100 females there were 111.5 males, and for every 100 females age 18 and over there were 117.6 males age 18 and over.

0.0% of residents lived in urban areas, while 100.0% lived in rural areas.

There were 17 households in Platinum, of which 70.6% had children under the age of 18 living in them. Of all households, 47.1% were married-couple households, 5.9% were households with a male householder and no spouse or partner present, and 29.4% were households with a female householder and no spouse or partner present. About 5.9% of all households were made up of individuals and 0.0% had someone living alone who was 65 years of age or older.

There were 30 housing units, of which 43.3% were vacant. The homeowner vacancy rate was 0.0% and the rental vacancy rate was 0.0%.

Racial composition as of the 2020 census
Race	Number	Percent
White	1	1.8%
Black or African American	0	0.0%
American Indian and Alaska Native	47	85.5%
Asian	0	0.0%
Native Hawaiian and Other Pacific Islander	0	0.0%
Some other race	0	0.0%
Two or more races	7	12.7%
Hispanic or Latino (of any race)	1	1.8%

=== 2000 census ===
As of the census of 2000, there were 41 people, 17 households, and 9 families residing in the city. The population density was 0.9 inhabitants per square mile (0.35/km^{2}). There were 26 housing units at an average density of 0.6 units per square mile (0.23 units/km^{2}). The racial makeup of the city was 7.32% White, 90.24% Native American, and 2.44% from two or more races.

There were 17 households, out of which 47.1% had children under the age of 18 living with them, 29.4% were married couples living together, 11.8% had a female householder with no husband present, and 41.2% were non-families. 41.2% of all households were made up of individuals, and none had someone living alone who was 65 years of age or older. The average household size was 2.41 and the average family size was 2.90.

In the city, the age distribution of the population shows 26.8% under the age of 18, 2.4% from 18 to 24, 43.9% from 25 to 44, 17.1% from 45 to 64, and 9.8% who were 65 years of age or older. The median age was 32 years. For every 100 females, there were 105.0 males. For every 100 females age 18 and over, there were 130.8 males.

The median income for a household in the city was $21,250, and the median income for a family was $22,500. The per capita income for the city was $7,632. There are 33.3% of families living below the poverty line and 22.0% of the population, including 33.3% of under eighteens and none of those over 64

== Education ==
Lower Kuskokwim School District operates the Arviq School, K-12. Due to a decline in student enrollment it closed in Spring 2001, but it reopened in October 2007. As of 2018 the school had 20 students.

== Geology ==
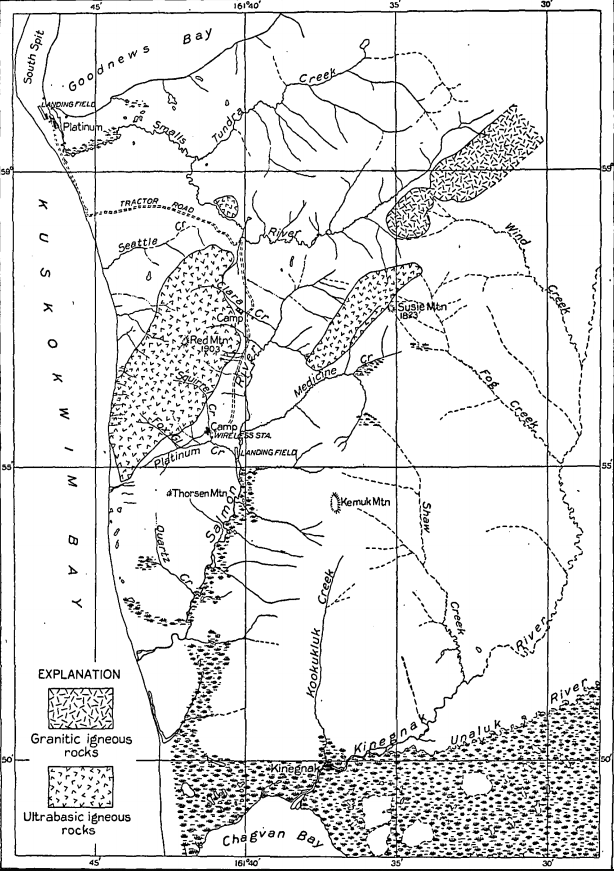
Platinum, Alaska, geologic map showing the location of creeks associated with platinum placer deposits.

In 1926, Walter Smith, a Yup'ik, discovered what he thought was "white gold" at the mouth of Fox Gulch, a tributary of Platinum Creek. Samples sent to the United States Bureau of Mines in Fairbanks determined it was actually platinum. In 1928, Charles Thorsen discovered platinum in Clara Creek, while Edward St. Clair discovered platinum in Squirrel Creek. Consolidation of the subsequent mining claims resulted in Goodnews Bay Mining Co. and Clara Creek Mining Co. becoming the major operators mining these placer deposits containing 60 per cent platinum and 22 percent iridium. The largest nugget was found on Squirrel Creek and weighed 1.5 ounces. These placers are found in the drainage east of Red Mountain, which is composed of dunite. However, platinum has not been found on the mountain. Goodnews Bay Mining Co. started operating a dragline excavator on Squirrel Creek on August 11, 1934, and on Platinum Creek and Fox Gulch in 1937. The company started operations with a dredge in Nov. 1937. The Clara Creek Mining Co. started mining operations on Clara Creek in 1936. A total of 3000 ounces of platinum metals were recovered from all mining operations between 1927 and 1934, and 18,000 ounces between 1934 and 1937.
