= Florence Nupok Malewotkuk =

Siberian Yupik painter from Alaska (1906–1971)

- Florence Nupok Malewotkuk working on a brush painting in 1965
- Born: Nupok / Napaaq; March 4, 1906; Gambell, Alaska
- Died: 1971 (aged 64–65); Anchorage, Alaska
- Citizenship: Native Village of Gambell and American
- Known for: Painting

Florence Nupok Malewotkuk (March 4, 1906 – 1971), also spelled Napaaq Maligutkak, was a Siberian Yupik artist known for her drawings of native Eskimo culture, scenes of local wildlife, and documentation of native tattoos. Her "somewhat naive" style earned her the title of "Grandma Moses of the Bering Sea." She was also a skilled artisan of beaded items such as sealskin Mukluks, toys, and slippers. Nupok's artwork has been exhibited across the United States and is in the permanent collection of institutions including the University of Alaska, the National Museum of the American Indian, the Anchorage Museum of History and Art, and the Smithsonian Institution.

== Early life ==
Nupok was born in the small village of Gambell, on St. Lawrence Island off the western coast of Alaska, to Peter Aghnilu Okinello and Akimuq Qenaaghaq. With the encouragement of an uncle, she began drawing as a young girl at home by lamplight. With resources scarce, Nupok would draw on drawing tablets, labels from tin cans, or on sealskin.

Nupok married Chauncy Malewotkuk in 1926. The couple adopted a son, Woodrow, in 1933.

=== Drawings for Otto W. Geist ===
At the end of 1927, archaeologist Otto William Geist was on St. Lawrence Island and commissioned Nupok to create drawings documenting the traditional practices of the early 20th-century Siberian Yupik. Over the winter, she eventually completed over ninety drawings for this collection. Her drawings depicted everyday scenes and figurative studies, documenting fur clothing, food preparation, hunting, fishing, and life in homes and camps. Geist published several of her drawings in his report Archaeological Excavations at Kukulik, which was published by the United States Department of the Interior. The collection of drawings is now housed at the Elmer E. Rasmuson Library at the University of Alaska, with copies in the Smithsonian.

=== Documentation of tattoos ===
Nupok's interest in and documentation of women's tattoo markings have been a valuable resource in the study of traditional women's tattoos among the Eskimo people, including markings on the faces of hands of Siberian Yupik, Alaska Yupik, and Inupiaq people.

== Later career ==
For some years after the Geist commission, Nupok focused on homemaking. In 1955, she took a new commission from Anchorage artist Kay Roberts, who sold reprints of the artwork under the name "Bering Sea Originals." Roberts paid for the artwork, but Nupok did not receive any additional profits from the sale of these works. After 1965, Nupok created more of these commercial-friendly artworks under the same trademark, including more whimsical illustrations of walruses dancing and dining.

In 1964, Nupok was accepted into a government-funded designer-craftsman training course in Nome, Alaska, sponsored by the Indian Arts and Crafts Board. She was the only woman in the 32-person class, which was a program of the Manpower Development and Training Act of 1962. Nupok was also the only member of the class familiar with working with graphic arts on paper.

After an extended illness of Echinococcosis, Nupok died in Anchorage in the spring of 1971. That same year, the University of Alaska showed a retrospective of her work.
