= Otto W. Geist =

German explorer and naturalist (1888–1963)

Otto William Geist
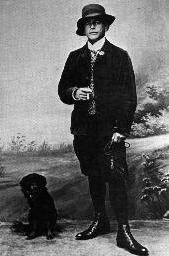
- Geist aged sixteen in 1905.
- Born: December 27, 1888; Eiselfing, Bavaria
- Died: August 2, 1963 (aged 74); Munich, Germany
- Known for: Archaeological and ethnographic studies of St. Lawrence Island
- Scientific career
- Fields: Vertebrate Paleontology; Archaeology
- Workplaces: University of Alaska Fairbanks; American Museum of Natural History
- Patrons: Charles E. Bunnell
- Military career
- Allegiance: German Empire; United States; Alaska
- Branch: Imperial German Army; United States Army; Alaska Territorial Guard
- Service years: 1908–1910 (Germany); 1916–1919 (U.S. Army) c. 1946 (Alaska)
- Rank: Major (Alaska)
- Conflicts: Pancho Villa Expedition; World War I World War II

Otto William Geist (December 27, 1888 – August 2, 1963), a.k.a. Aghvook, was an archaeologist, explorer and naturalist who worked in the circumpolar north and for the University of Alaska for much of his adult life.

== Early life ==
Geist was born on December 27, 1888 in Kircheiselfing, Bavaria to Franz Anton Geist and his wife. He was their eleventh child and had fourteen siblings. His father was a school superintendent, as well as an amateur archaeologist, and Geist grew learning about Hallstatt, La Tene, and Roman archaeology. He was educated at traditional Bavarian schools, as well as by his brother and at a Benedictine school in the Tyrol, where he learned mechanical drawing techniques. As a teenager, he worked as a apprentice in art metalworks, at a locomotive factory building trains for the Trans-Siberian Railway, and as a sightseeing bus driver.

== German and U.S. military service ==
In 1908, Geist was conscripted into the German Army under Wilhelm II. Despite being a skilled sharpshooter, he disliked the army, and after a two-year service, immigrated to the United States, following three of his brothers, who worked as gardeners in Louisiana. He briefly lived in Chicago with his brother Josef and worked as a hospital orderly, before bouncing between Midwestern cities like St. Louis and Kansas City. One of his jobs including chauffeuring politician Sterling Morton.

In 1916, Geist entered the U.S. Army and served as a mechanic for the trucks in the Pancho Villa Expedition led by General John J. Pershing. When the U.S. entered World War I in 1917, he enlisted for army service again, and after receiving his U.S. citizenship, was sent to France to serve as a truck driver. Geist remained in France after the end of the war, and drove visiting U.S. officials including Margaret Woodrow Wilson and the American delegation to the Paris Peace Conference.

During World War II, Geist was a major in the Alaska Territorial Guard under Marvin "Muktuk" Marston.

== Move to Alaska and archaeological career ==
After being discharged from the military in 1920, Geist returned to Kansas City and attempted to establish a truck hauling business. He was discouraged by the economy of the Great Depression and his financial troubles led to a spurned marriage proposal by a banker's daughter; in 1923, he followed his brother Josef to Anchorage, Alaska. He worked for the Alaska Railroad, as a dishwasher, as a miner in Bettles, Alaska, and as an engineer on board the sternwheeler Teddy R. While aboard the Teddy R., he met naturalists Olaus and Margaret Murie, who noticed his sense of curiosity and helped mentor him on scientific techniques for collecting and preserving archaeological and biological specimens, including field taxidermy.

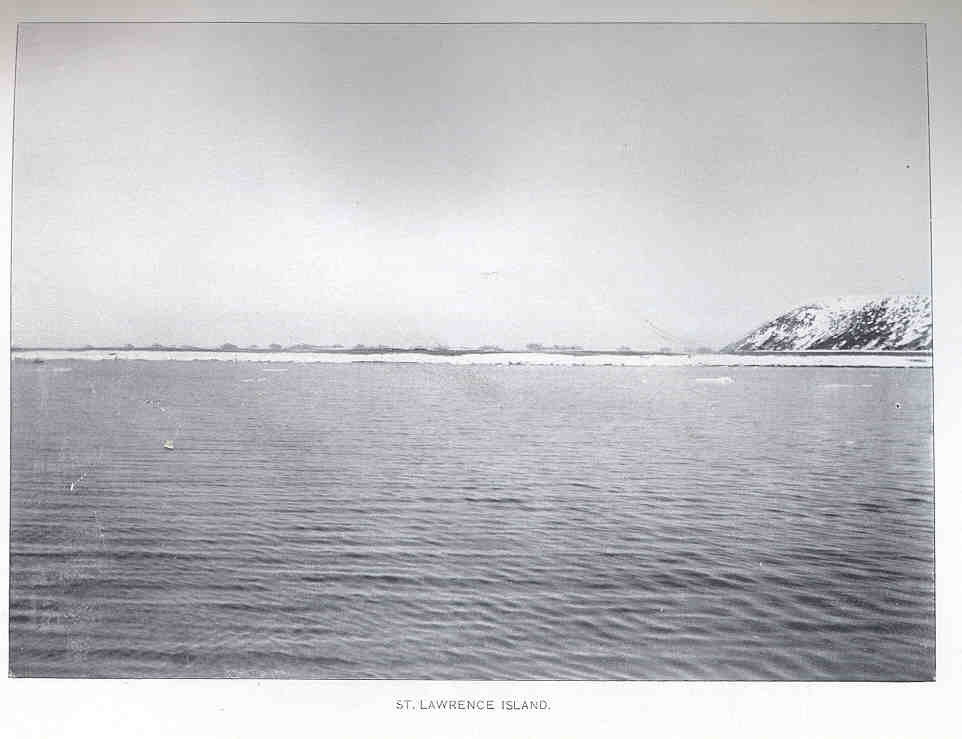
View of St. Lawrence Island, where Geist conducted several years of research, in 1899.

Through Olaus Murie, Geist connected with Charles E. Bunnell, the president of the Alaska Agricultural College and School of Mines, which would later become the University of Alaska Fairbanks. With Bunnell's support, he organized his first expedition in 1926 and traveling to the Bering Sea and Arctic regions to collect archaeological and ethnographic objects. It was on this expedition that he first visited St. Lawrence Island, Kukulik where he would return for the next nine field seasons. His trip there in 1927 was formally funded by the University of Alaska, and the objects he collected would eventually become the basis of the University of Alaska Museum of the North, which holds one of the largest collections of Eskimo materials in the world. Another governmental grant allowed him to excavate the historic village of Kukulik, which had been decimated by the St. Lawrence Island famine. Geist also excavated the village of Okvik in the Punuk Islands, and published significant findings on Thule culture. He commissioned Siberian Yupik artist Florence Nupok Malewotkuk to draw a series of drawings of everyday scenes and people for the university. Some drawings were also included in Geist's report Archaeological Excavations at Kukulik, published by the United States Department of the Interior.

Geist became close with the natives of St. Lawrence Island, and even lived with notable Eskimo hunter, Otiyahok. He served on Otiyahok's whaling crew and was given the name "Aghvook", and was one of few white people allowed to engage with the cultural ceremonies and rites associated with whaling, death, and birth. Between 1927 and 1933, Geist took the first and largest sample of historical photographs of the Yupik people. He also worked closely with Froelich Rainey, who went on to establish the UAF anthropology program.

In the late 1920s, Geist began collecting Pleistocene fossils from mining areas for the University and the Fairbanks Exploration Company, as well as the Frick Laboratory based at the American Museum of Natural History. By 1935, he was largely focused on paleontological work, and sent thousands of bones to the museum, including a large collection of polar bear skulls and a baby Alaskan mammoth skeleton, which was given the name Effie. The polar bear skulls were later realized as funerary objects, making their excavation illegal under the 1990 Native American Graves Protection and Repatriation Act (NAGPRA). The repatriation process began in 2013.

In 1936, Geist conducted research on the Black Rapids Glacier, then traveling at the rapid rate of a mile per month. After completing service in the Alaska Territorial Guard in 1946, he returned to collecting fossils for UAF and the Frick Laboratory, and traveled to far flung places Cape Yakataga and Tanana Valley in the late 1940s on expeditions. In the early 1960s, he worked out of a research laboratory at Point Barrow, Alaska.

Shortly upon arriving in Europe for an international vacation, Geist fell ill, reportedly with cancer. After spending a year in a Munich hospital, he died on August 2, 1963. Ivar Skarland, an anthropologist, colleague, and friend of Geist, provided a eulogy and attended his burial in Eiselfing.

== Legacy ==
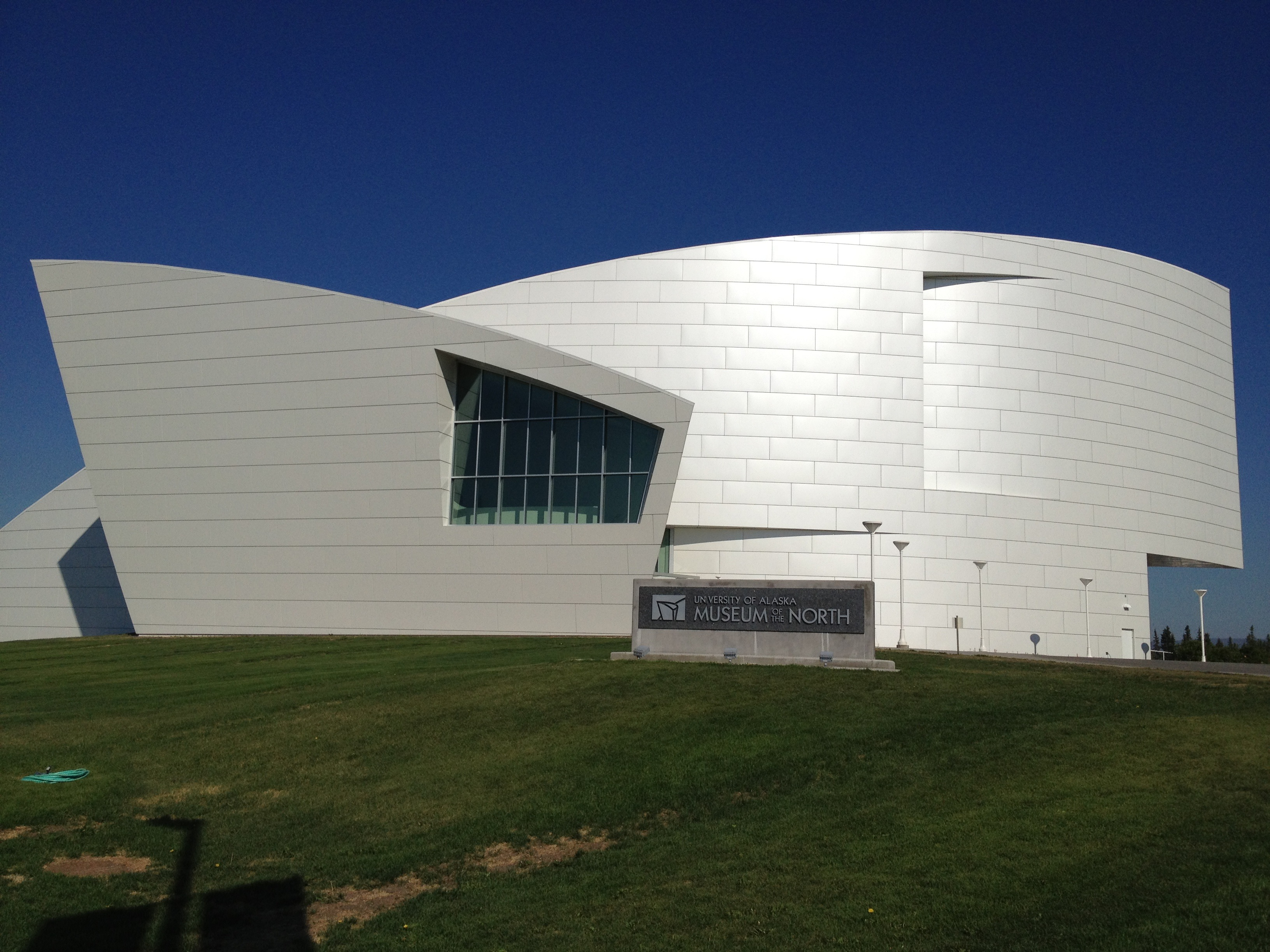
The Geist Building housing the University of Alaska Museum of the North.

In 1957, Geist received an honorary doctorate from the University of Alaska Fairbanks. He was a fellow of the American Association for the Advancement of Science, the American Anthropological Association, and the Arctic Institute of North America. The building housing the university's museum was named after him.

Geist Road, a section line road marking the southern boundary of the UAF campus, as well as a major arterial road on the west side of Fairbanks and the road connecting the Johansen Expressway to the Parks Highway, was also named for him.

Mount Geist (10,716 ft; 3,266 m), in the Alaska Range 87 mi S SE of Fairbanks, was also named for him, to honor this "pioneer researcher of paleontology, archeology and glaceology in Alaska ..."
