= Ivar Skarland =

Norwegian anthropologist (1899-1965)

Ivar Skarland (September 2, 1899 – January 1, 1965) was a Norwegian anthropologist.

Skarland was born in Høylandet Municipality, Norway, on September 2, 1899. He earned a diploma from the Steinkjer School of Forestry in Norway in 1921 before moving to the United States for further education. He studied English at the Alaska Agricultural College and School of Mines, graduating in 1935. In 1942, he was awarded a master's degree in Anthropology from Harvard University and in 1948 received a Ph.D. from the same institution. He was a student of Earnest Hooton. He worked with Otto W. Geist. In 1965, Mount Skarland in the Alaska Range was officially named after him.

== Works ==
- The Geography and Archaeology of Alaska in Pleistocene and Early Post-glacial Time (1949)
