= Central Alaskan Yup'ik =

Central Alaskan Yup'ik may refer to:

- Central Alaskan Yup'ik people
- Central Alaskan Yup'ik language
