= Twin Hills, Alaska =

Twin Hills, Alaska Ingricuar
- Census-designated place
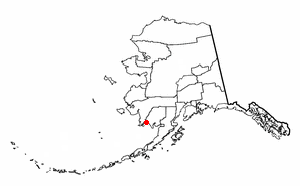
- Location of Twin Hills, Alaska
- Coordinates: 59°4′41″N 160°17′4″W
- Country: United States
- State: Alaska
- Census Area: Dillingham

Government
  - State senator: Lyman Hoffman (D)
  - State rep.: Bryce Edgmon (I)

Area
  - Total: 23.04 sq mi (59.67 km^{2})
  - Land: 22.90 sq mi (59.32 km^{2})
  - Water: 0.14 sq mi (0.35 km^{2})
- Elevation: 10 ft (3.0 m)

Population (2020)
  - Total: 103
  - Density: 4.5/sq mi (1.74/km^{2})
- Time zone: UTC-9 (Alaska (AKST))
  - Summer (DST): UTC-8 (AKDT)
- ZIP code: 99576
- Area code: 907
- FIPS code: 02-79780

Twin Hills (Central Yupik: Ingricuar) is a census-designated place (CDP) in Dillingham Census Area, Alaska, United States. As of the 2020 census, Twin Hills had a population of 103.

Although Twin Hills wasn't settled until 1965, the present CDP encompasses the original settlement of Togiak (then Togiagamute) on the northeast side of Togiak Bay. In the early 20th century, many residents removed to the northwest side of the bay to establish the "new" Togiak.

== Geography ==
Twin Hills is located at 59°4′41″N 160°17′4″W (59.077924, -160.284513), at the northeast end of Togiak Bay and adjacent to the city of Togiak.

According to the United States Census Bureau, the CDP has a total area of 23.1 square miles (59.7 km^{2}), of which 22.8 square miles (59.0 km^{2}) is land and 0.3 square miles (0.7 km^{2}), or 1.15%, is water.

== Demographics ==
Historical population
Census	Pop.	Note	%±
1880	276		—
1890	94		−65.9%
1970	67		—
1980	70		4.5%
1990	66		−5.7%
2000	69		4.5%
2010	74		7.2%
2020	103		39.2%
U.S. Decennial Census

Twin Hills's predecessor village of Togiagamute first appeared on the 1880 U.S. Census as an unincorporated Inuit village (all residents were Inuit). It returned in 1890 as "Togiagamiut" (all 94 residents were Native). With the removal of most of its residents to the "new" Togiak on the opposite side of Togiak Bay, it did not report again until 1970 when the new unincorporated settlement of Twin Hills was established to the north of the original townsite. In 1980, it was made a census-designated place.

As of the census of 2000, there were 69 people, 24 households, and 18 families residing in the CDP. The population density was 3.2 inhabitants per square mile (1.2/km^{2}). There were 33 housing units at an average density of 1.5 per square mile (0.58/km^{2}). The racial makeup of the CDP was 5.80% White, 84.06% Native American, and 10.14% from two or more races.

There were 24 households, out of which 37.5% had children under the age of 18 living with them, 29.2% were married couples living together, 20.8% had a female householder with no husband present, and 25.0% were non-families. 16.7% of all households were made up of individuals, and 12.5% had someone living alone who was 65 years of age or older. The average household size was 2.88 and the average family size was 2.94.

In the CDP, the population was spread out, with 36.2% under the age of 18, 2.9% from 18 to 24, 21.7% from 25 to 44, 27.5% from 45 to 64, and 11.6% who were 65 years of age or older. The median age was 38 years. For every 100 females, there were 81.6 males. For every 100 females age 18 and over, there were 100.0 males.

The median income for a household in the CDP was $29,375, and the median income for a family was $20,625. Males had a median income of $0 versus $0 for females. The per capita income for the CDP was $16,856. There were 22.2% of families and 27.9% of the population living below the poverty line, including 61.5% of under eighteens and none of those over 64. The median home value is $108,300.

== Education ==
It is served by the Twin Hills School of the Southwest Region School District.
