= Southwest Region School District =

School district in Alaska, United States

Address
- 574 Kenny Wren Road Dillingham, Alaska, 99576; United States

District information
- Type: Public
- Grades: Pre-K–12
- NCES District ID: 0200710

Students and staff
- Students: 615
- Teachers: 47.55
- Staff: 89.21
- Student–teacher ratio: 12.93

Other information
- Website: www.swrsd.org

Southwest Region School District (SWRSD) or Southwest Region Schools is a school district headquartered in Dillingham, Alaska. The district serves the area around Bristol Bay. Its communities are in the Dillingham Census Area.

== History ==
Don Evans began his term as the district superintendent in 1993. In 1998 he left and founded Education Resources Inc., a company that provides administrative services to rural Alaska school districts. That year Education Resources Inc. began providing such services to the Southwest Region district. Marie Paul, a member of the Southwest Region board originating from Togiak, stated that the quality of administrative services remained the same.

In 1999 the school district had 775 students living in nine areas.

== Schools ==
- Aleknagik School - Aleknagik
- Clarks Point School - Clarks Point - Due to declining enrollment, it closed in May 2012, but re-opened in 2017
- William "Sonny" Nelson School - Ekwok
- Koliganek School - Koliganek
- Manokotak 'Nunaniq' School - Manokotak
- "Chief" Ivan Blunka School - New Stuyahok
- Togiak School - Togiak
- Twin Hills School - Twin Hills

Former schools:

- Portage Creek School - Portage Creek
