= Uyaquq =

American Christian missionary (ca. 1860–1924)

Uyaquq (also Uyaquk or Uyakoq; sometimes referred to in English as Helper Neck) (ca. 1860–1924) was a member of the Yup'ik people who became a Helper in the Moravian Church. Noted for his linguistic abilities, he went from being an illiterate adult to inventing a series of writing systems for his native language and then producing translations of the Bible and other religious works in a period of five years.

== Biography ==
Uyaquq was born into a family of shamans in the lower Kuskokwim River valley of central Alaska in the mid-1860s. Even by the standards of the day, Uyaquq was a small man. He became a shaman in early adulthood, but converted to Christianity after his father converted. Although his father became a Russian Orthodox, Uyaquq became a leader and missionary in the Alaskan Moravian Church. His name means "Neck" in English and he was called that by some English speakers.

As a missionary, Uyaquq is said to have converted whole villages of Yupik in the lower Kuskokwim River valley to Christianity. He is said to have had a gentle personality and have been a very erudite speaker.

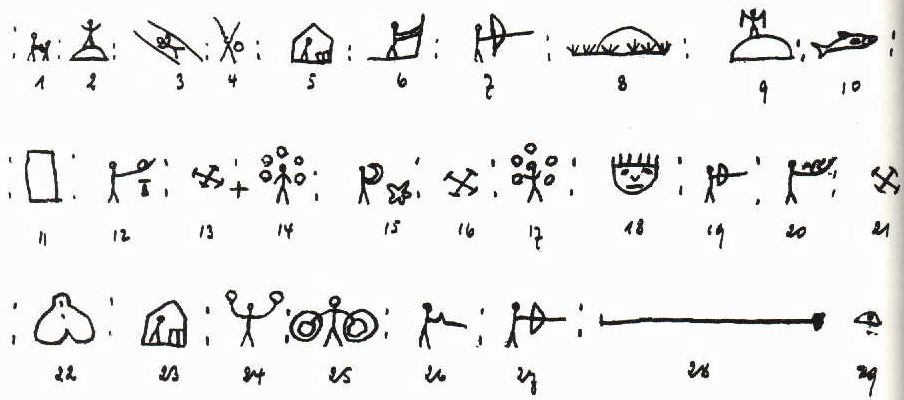
The Lord's Prayer in Yugtun script.

Uyaquq was fascinated by the idea that the English-speaking Moravians could quote a passage of scripture several times using exactly the same words each time. He discovered that they accomplished this by reading from a written text. Uyaquq became fascinated with the idea of writing and, according to his descendants, received the idea for the first version of the script he used to write his dialect, Yugtun, in a dream.

Reverend John Hinz, a Moravian missionary in Alaska, and an accomplished linguist, was astonished upon hearing of Uyaquq's invention. Hinz took Uyaquq to the Bethel mission house so that he could continue his linguistic work. Uyaquq is said to have written constantly during the trip, writing as many stories from the Bible as he could in the new script without stopping to sleep. Hinz and the Kilbucks aided Uyaquq by telling him scriptures, but Uyaquq refused to learn to read or write English, as he thought that English literacy would make him lose his identity as a Yupik.

In the next five years, Uyaquq's Yugtun script evolved from its original form of pictographs to a syllabary. This evolution began when Uyaquq decided that his hieroglyphics were a good memory aid but they did not represent passages with enough accuracy that they could be reproduced verbatim time after time. Uyaquq identified the concept of a syllable and his script evolved in five stages until he had created a symbol for each syllable in the language. Each of the five steps was documented in several notebooks kept by Uyaquq. He taught his writing system to several of his missionary helpers and they used it in their church work.

Although the system adopted by most people for writing Yupik was the Roman-based script of Reverend Hinz, and, in about 1970, the University of Alaska system, Uyaquq's system has been studied because it may represent the same process of evolution from illiteracy to proto-writing to syllabary taken by many ancient written languages, like Chinese and Egyptian, but compressed into a period of five years. Uyaquq's notebooks and the writings of those who watched him at work have been the subject of research, beginning with Dr. Alfred Schmitt in the 1930s.
