= Meyers Chuck, Wrangell =

Meyers Chuck, Alaska
- Former census-designated place
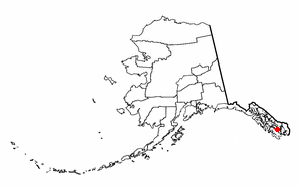
- Location of Meyers Chuck, Alaska
- Coordinates: 55°44′31″N 132°15′48″W
- Country: United States
- State: Alaska
- Borough: Wrangell

Government
  - State senator: Bert Stedman (R)
  - State rep.: Dan Ortiz (I)

Area
  - Total: 0.81 sq mi (2.1 km^{2})
  - Land: 0.58 sq mi (1.5 km^{2})
  - Water: 0.23 sq mi (0.6 km^{2})
- Elevation: 3.3 ft (1 m)

Population (2000)
  - Total: 21
  - Density: 36/sq mi (13.9/km^{2})
- Time zone: UTC-9 (Alaska (AKST))
  - Summer (DST): UTC-8 (AKDT)
- ZIP code: 99903
- Area code: 907
- FIPS code: 02-48980
- GNIS feature ID: 1423664

Meyers Chuck is a former census-designated place in the City and Borough of Wrangell, Alaska, United States. The population was 21 at the 2000 census, at which time it was in the former Prince of Wales-Outer Ketchikan Census Area. On June 1, 2008, it was annexed into the newly created City and Borough of Wrangell, most of whose territory came from the former Wrangell-Petersburg Census Area.

== Geography ==
Meyers Chuck is located at 55°44′31″N 132°15′48″W (55.742005, -132.263441). According to the United States Census Bureau, the CDP had a total area of 0.8 square miles (2.1 km^{2}), of which, 0.6 square miles (1.6 km^{2}) of it is land and 0.2 square miles (0.52 km^{2}) of it (28.05%) is water. There are only two ways to get to Meyers Chuck, Alaska: by boat or float plane.

== Demographics ==
Historical population
Census	Pop.	Note	%±
1940	107		—
1950	51		−52.3%
1960	27		−47.1%
1970	37		37.0%
1980	50		35.1%
1990	43		−14.0%
2000	21		−51.2%
U.S. Decennial Census

Meyers Chuck first reported on the 1950 U.S. Census as the unincorporated village of "Meyer's Chuck." From 1950 to 1970, it was returned as "Myers Chuck." In 1980 it returned as Meyers Chuck, when it was made a census-designated place (CDP). In 2008, it was formally annexed into Wrangell.

As of the census of 2000, there were 21 people, 9 households, and 7 families residing in the CDP. The population density was 36.0 inhabitants per square mile (13.9/km^{2}). There were 48 housing units at an average density of 82.4 per square mile (31.8/km^{2}). The racial makeup of the CDP was 90.48% White, and 9.52% from two or more races.

There were nine households, of which two had children under the age of 18 living with them, six were married couples living together, one had a female householder with no husband present, and two were non-families. No households were made up of individuals, and none had someone living alone who was 65 years of age or older. The average household size was 2.33 and the average family size was 2.29.

In the CDP, the age distribution of the population shows 9.5% under the age of 18, 23.8% from 25 to 44, 61.9% from 45 to 64, and 4.8% who were 65 years of age or older. The median age was 50 years. For every 100 females, there were 110.0 males. For every 100 females age 18 and over, there were 111.1 males.

The median income for a household in the CDP was $64,375, and the median income for a family was $64,375. The per capita income for the CDP was $31,660. There were no one living below the poverty line.
