= Area code 907 =

Telephone area code for Alaska

Coordinates: 64°N 153°W

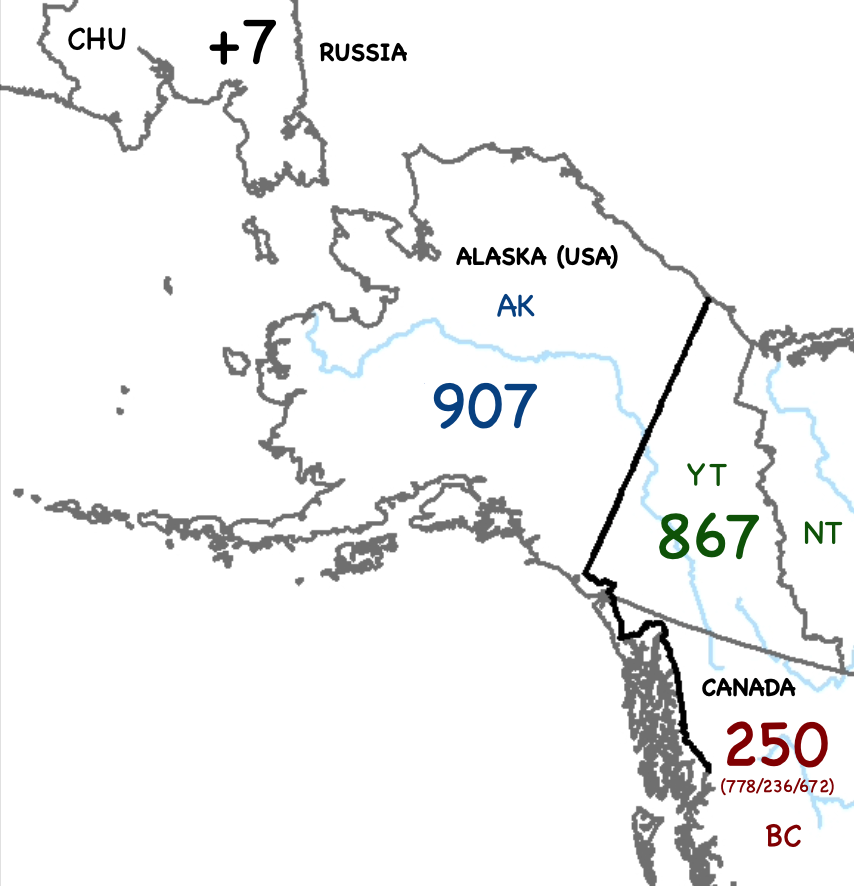
Map of Alaska's area code, 907, as well as the other dialing codes surrounding it.

Area code 907 is the sole telephone area code in the North American Numbering Plan (NANP) for the U.S. state of Alaska.

Alaska was assigned its area code in 1956, when the first commercial submarine cable was opened for traffic in December.

== History ==
Telephone service to Alaska was provided from the contiguous United States via a terrestrial line to the town of Juneau since 1937, The Alaska submarine cable was opened for traffic on December 11, 1956, linking Port Angeles, Washington, with Ketchikan, Juneau, and Skagway in Alaska

The Alaska numbering plan area is geographically the largest of any in the United States. It is the second-largest in the NANP, and on the entire North American continent behind 867, which serves Canada's northern territories. Because the Aleutian Islands of Alaska cross longitude 180, the Anti-Meridian, 907 may be considered to be both the farthest west and the farthest east of all area codes in the NANP. Due to Alaska's low population, 907 is one of only twelve remaining area codes serving an entire state. It is not projected to be exhausted until after 2049.

The small southeastern community of Hyder is not served by the area code, but by the Canadian overlay complex 236/250/257/672/778 from the Stewart, British Columbia rate center.

Prior to October 2021, area code 907 had telephone numbers assigned for the central office code 988. In 2020, 988 was designated nationwide as a dialing code for the National Suicide Prevention Lifeline, which created a conflict for exchanges that permit seven-digit dialing. This area code was therefore scheduled to transition to ten-digit dialing by October 24, 2021.

== Central office prefixes ==
Note: Dashes in the "Introduced" field indicate the prefix was in use before February 4, 1994.

Central office prefixes in area code 907
Prefix	Location	Subdivision	Introduced
200	Valdez	Chugach Census Area	February 21, 2006
201	Fort Richardson	City and Borough of Anchorage	September 18, 2014
202	Anchorage	City and Borough of Anchorage	July 25, 2014
203	Wasilla	Matanuska-Susitna Borough	September 18, 2014
204	Ketchikan	Ketchikan Gateway Borough	March 23, 2016
205	Anchorage	City and Borough of Anchorage	October 9, 2014
206	Anchorage	City and Borough of Anchorage	January 17, 2020
207	Bethel	Bethel Census Area	June 8, 2020
209	Juneau	City and Borough of Juneau	March 20, 2001
212	Anchorage	City and Borough of Anchorage	August 15, 2006
214	Wasilla	Matanuska-Susitna Borough	April 3, 2020
220	Ketchikan	Ketchikan Gateway Borough	January 3, 2007
221	Fort Yukon	Yukon–Koyukuk Census Area	January 4, 2007
222	Anchorage	City and Borough of Anchorage	January 5, 2007
223	Anchorage	City and Borough of Anchorage	January 10, 1996
224	Seward	Kenai Peninsula Borough	January 11, 1996
225	Ketchikan	Ketchikan Gateway Borough	January 12, 1996
226	Homer	Kenai Peninsula Borough	March 3, 2001
227	Anchorage	City and Borough of Anchorage	February 11, 1995
228	Ketchikan	Ketchikan Gateway Borough	February 12, 1995
229	Anchorage	City and Borough of Anchorage	February 13, 1995
230	Anchorage	City and Borough of Anchorage	April 15, 1996
231	Anchorage	City and Borough of Anchorage	January 21, 2011
232	Wasilla	Matanuska-Susitna Borough	February 11, 1995
233	Egegik	Lake and Peninsula Borough	-
234	Seldovia	Kenai Peninsula Borough	-
235	Anchor Point	Kenai Peninsula Borough	-
236	Clark's Point	Dillingham Census Area	-
237	Tununak	Bethel Census Area	-
238	Alakanuk	Kusilvak Census Area	-
239	Elfin Cove	Hoonah-Angoon Census Area	-
240	Anchorage	City and Borough of Anchorage	January 10, 1996
241	Karluk	Kodiak Island Borough	-
242	Anchorage	City and Borough of Anchorage	September 11, 1994
243	Anchorage	City and Borough of Anchorage	-
244	Anchorage	City and Borough of Anchorage	-
245	Anchorage	City and Borough of Anchorage	-
246	King Salmon	Bristol Bay Borough	-
247	Ketchikan	Ketchikan Gateway Borough	-
248	Anchorage	City and Borough of Anchorage	-
249	Anchorage	City and Borough of Anchorage	-
250	Anchorage	City and Borough of Anchorage	April 1, 1997
251	Fairbanks	Fairbanks North Star Borough	October 21, 2015
252	Soldotna	Kenai Peninsula Borough	-
253	Cordova	Chugach Census Area	February 11, 1995
254	Ketchikan	Ketchikan Gateway Borough	September 11, 1994
255	Valdez	Chugach Census Area	-
256	Eek	Bethel Census Area	-
257	Anchorage	City and Borough of Anchorage	-
258	Anchorage	City and Borough of Anchorage	-
259	Glennallen	Copper River Census Area	February 11, 1995
260	Soldotna	Kenai Peninsula Borough	-
261	Anchorage	City and Borough of Anchorage	-
262	Soldotna	Kenai Peninsula Borough	-
263	Anchorage	City and Borough of Anchorage	-
264	Anchorage	City and Borough of Anchorage	-
265	Anchorage	City and Borough of Anchorage	-
266	Anchorage	City and Borough of Anchorage	-
267	Anchorage	City and Borough of Anchorage	-
268	Anchorage	City and Borough of Anchorage	March 8, 2010
269	Anchorage	City and Borough of Anchorage	-
270	Anchorage	City and Borough of Anchorage	April 1, 1997
271	Anchorage	City and Borough of Anchorage	-
272	Anchorage	City and Borough of Anchorage	-
273	Anchorage	City and Borough of Anchorage	-
274	Anchorage	City and Borough of Anchorage	-
275	Anchorage	City and Borough of Anchorage	-
276	Anchorage	City and Borough of Anchorage	-
277	Anchorage	City and Borough of Anchorage	-
278	Anchorage	City and Borough of Anchorage	-
279	Anchorage	City and Borough of Anchorage	-
280	Anchorage	City and Borough of Anchorage	April 1, 1997
281	Seldovia	Kenai Peninsula Borough	-
282	Iliamna	Lake and Peninsula Borough	-
283	Kenai	Kenai Peninsula Borough	-
284	Seldovia	Kenai Peninsula Borough	-
285	Hydaburg	Prince of Wales-Hyder Census Area	-
286	Old Harbor	Kodiak Island Borough	-
287	Levelock	Lake and Peninsula Borough	-
288	Moose Pass	Kenai Peninsula Borough	-
289	Manokotak	Dillingham Census Area	-
290	Ninilchik	Kenai Peninsula Borough	January 25, 2016
291	Tanacross	Southeast Fairbanks Census Area	-
292	Yakutat	City and Borough of Yakutat	May 30, 2012
293	Nikolai	Aleutians West Census Area	-
294	Nondalton	Lake and Peninsula Borough	-
295	Stevens Village	Yukon–Koyukuk Census Area	February 11, 1995
296	Homer	Kenai Peninsula Borough	-
297	Anchorage	City and Borough of Anchorage	October 15, 1996
298	Takotna	Yukon–Koyukuk Census Area	-
299	Homer	Kenai Peninsula Borough	January 10, 1996
301	Anchorage	City and Borough of Anchorage	June 30, 2001
302	Anchorage	City and Borough of Anchorage	September 15, 2016
303	Haines	Haines Borough	July 12, 2006
304	Nome	Nome Census Area	May 12, 2006
305	Wrangell	City and Borough of Wrangell	July 25, 2006
306	Anchorage	City and Borough of Anchorage	October 12, 2006
308	Anchorage	City and Borough of Anchorage	January 16, 2019
309	Chugiak	City and Borough of Anchorage	December 20, 2017
310	Anchorage	City and Borough of Anchorage	July 25, 2007
312	Anchorage	City and Borough of Anchorage	November 29, 2012
313	Anchorage	City and Borough of Anchorage	May 25, 2017
314	Haines	Haines Borough	July 25, 2006
315	Wasilla	Matanuska-Susitna Borough	September 17, 2007
316	Cordova	Chugach Census Area	March 18, 2021
317	Anchorage	City and Borough of Anchorage	January 11, 2002
318	Anchorage	City and Borough of Anchorage	May 29, 2019
319	Prudhoe Bay	North Slope Borough	June 30, 2015
320	Glennallen	Copper River Census Area	April 1, 1997
321	Juneau	City and Borough of Juneau	-
322	Fairbanks	Fairbanks North Star Borough	-
323	Delta Junction	Southeast Fairbanks Census Area	-
324	Northway	Southeast Fairbanks Census Area	-
325	Valdez	Chugach Census Area	
328	Fairbanks	Fairbanks North Star Borough	May 16, 2006
329	Coffman Cove	Ketchikan Gateway Borough	-
330	Anchorage	City and Borough of Anchorage	April 1, 1997
331	Anchorage	City and Borough of Anchorage	-
332	Anchorage	City and Borough of Anchorage	July 22, 1999
333	Anchorage	City and Borough of Anchorage	-
334	Anchorage	City and Borough of Anchorage	October 31, 2000
335	Kenai	Kenai Peninsula Borough	August 20, 2000
336	Anchorage	City and Borough of Anchorage	October 13, 1999
337	Anchorage	City and Borough of Anchorage	-
338	Anchorage	City and Borough of Anchorage	-
339	Anchorage	City and Borough of Anchorage	October 31, 2000
340	Petersburg	Petersburg Borough	July 12, 2006
341	Anchorage	City and Borough of Anchorage	-
342	Anchorage	City and Borough of Anchorage	-
343	Anchorage	City and Borough of Anchorage	-
344	Anchorage	City and Borough of Anchorage	-
345	Anchorage	City and Borough of Anchorage	-
346	Anchorage	City and Borough of Anchorage	-
347	Fairbanks	Fairbanks North Star Borough	April 30, 2002
348	Anchorage	City and Borough of Anchorage	-
349	Anchorage	City and Borough of Anchorage	-
350	Anchorage	City and Borough of Anchorage	April 1, 1997
351	Anchorage	City and Borough of Anchorage	April 1, 1997
352	Wasilla	Matanuska-Susitna Borough	-
353	Fort Wainwright	Fairbanks North Star Borough	-
354	Wasilla	Matanuska-Susitna Borough	October 15, 1996
355	Wasilla	Matanuska-Susitna Borough	-
356	Fort Wainwright	Fairbanks North Star Borough	-
357	Wasilla	Matanuska-Susitna Borough	October 11, 1997
358	Rampart	Yukon–Koyukuk Census Area	-
359	Unalaska	Aleutians West Census Area	December 11, 2002
360	Anchorage	City and Borough of Anchorage	April 1, 1997
361	Fort Wainwright	Fairbanks North Star Borough	June 1, 2006
362	Seward	Kenai Peninsula Borough	February 11, 1995
363	Deering	Northwest Arctic Borough	-
364	Juneau	City and Borough of Juneau	-
365	Anchorage	City and Borough of Anchorage	October 11, 1997
366	Tanana	Yukon–Koyukuk Census Area	-
367	Barrow (Utqiagvik)	North Slope Borough	July 4, 1995
368	Point Hope	North Slope Borough	-
369	Eielson Air Force Base	Fairbanks North Star Borough	-
370	Fort Wainwright	Fairbanks North Star Borough	November 9, 2009
371	Fairbanks	Fairbanks North Star Borough	September 10, 2012
372	Eielson Air Force Base	Fairbanks North Star Borough	-
373	Wasilla	Matanuska-Susitna Borough	-
374	Fairbanks	Fairbanks North Star Borough	June 30, 2001
375	Anchorage	City and Borough of Anchorage	March 15, 2004
376	Wasilla	Matanuska-Susitna Borough	-
377	Eielson Air Force Base	Fairbanks North Star Borough	-
378	Fairbanks	Fairbanks North Star Borough	April 1, 1997
379	Healy	Denali Borough	June 10, 2019
380	Anchorage	City and Borough of Anchorage	July 6, 1997
381	Akutan	Aleutians East Borough	November 15, 2007
382	Girdwood	City and Borough of Anchorage	September 15, 2004
383	Sand Point	Nome Census Area	-
384	Fort Richardson	City and Borough of Anchorage	-
385	North Pole	Fairbanks North Star Borough	June 5, 2007
386	Sand Point	Nome Census Area	April 9, 2008
387	Nome	Nome Census Area	May 14, 2007
388	Fairbanks	Fairbanks North Star Borough	-
389	Fairbanks	Fairbanks North Star Borough	-
390	Chugiak	City and Borough of Anchorage	September 18, 2014
391	Unalaska	Aleutians West Census Area	-
392	Atka	Aleutians West Census Area	July 4, 1995
393	Atka	Aleutians West Census Area	July 4, 1995
394	Soldotna	Kenai Peninsula Borough	October 11, 1997
395	Kenai	Kenai Peninsula Borough	September 7, 2007
397	Metlakatla	Prince of Wales-Hyder Census Area	February 23, 2007
398	Soldotna	Kenai Peninsula Borough	-
399	Homer	Kenai Peninsula Borough	September 11, 1994
401	Craig	Prince of Wales-Hyder Census Area	July 25, 2006
402	Sitka	City and Borough of Sitka	March 18, 2021
404	Nome	Nome Census Area	February 23, 2007
406	Eagle River	City and Borough of Anchorage	July 15, 2014
409	Cantwell	Denali Borough	June 10, 2019
410	Yakutat	City and Borough of Yakutat	November 19, 2013
412	Kotzebue	Northwest Arctic Borough	September 5, 2008
413	Kodiak	Kodiak Island Borough	March 18, 2021
414	Wasilla	Matanuska-Susitna Borough	July 5, 2011
415	Fairbanks	Fairbanks North Star Borough	March 18, 2021
417	Nulato	Yukon–Koyukuk Census Area	December 21, 2017
419	Juneau	City and Borough of Juneau	November 29, 2012
420	Soldotna	Kenai Peninsula Borough	April 2, 2007
421	King Cove	Aleutians East Borough	December 20, 2017
422	Seward	Kenai Peninsula Borough	March 13, 2007
423	Cordova	Chugach Census Area	April 14, 2009
424	Cordova	Chugach Census Area	-
425	St. George Island	Aleutians West Census Area	October 15, 1996
426	Noatak	Northwest Arctic Borough	-
427	Tununak	Yukon–Koyukuk Census Area	-
428	Anchorage	City and Borough of Anchorage	-
429	Cordova	Chugach Census Area	May 18, 1998
430	Wasilla	Matanuska-Susitna Borough	November 20, 1998
432	Crooked Creek	Bethel Census Area	-
433	Anchorage	City and Borough of Anchorage	July 2, 2008
434	Nome	Nome Census Area	February 21, 2008
435	Homer	Kenai Peninsula Borough	April 14, 2007
437	Shungnak	Northwest Arctic Borough	-
438	St. Mary's	Kusilvak Census Area	-
439	King Salmon	Bristol Bay Borough	-
440	Anchorage	City and Borough of Anchorage	July 1, 1996
441	Anchorage	City and Borough of Anchorage	July 1, 1996
442	Kotzebue	Northwest Arctic Borough	-
443	Nome	Nome Census Area	-
444	Anchorage	City and Borough of Anchorage	October 11, 1997
445	Ambler	Northwest Arctic Borough	-
446	Fort Yukon	Yukon–Koyukuk Census Area	June 15, 2015
447	Red Devil	Bethel Census Area	-
448	Prudhoe Bay	North Slope Borough	July 4, 1995
449	Sleetmute	Bethel Census Area	-
450	Fairbanks	Fairbanks North Star Borough	May 10, 1999
451	Fairbanks	Fairbanks North Star Borough	-
452	Fairbanks	Fairbanks North Star Borough	-
453	Grayling	Yukon–Koyukuk Census Area	-
454	Port Lions	Kodiak Island Borough	-
455	Fairbanks	Fairbanks North Star Borough	-
456	Fairbanks	Fairbanks North Star Borough	-
457	Fairbanks	Fairbanks North Star Borough	-
458	Fairbanks	Fairbanks North Star Borough	-
459	Fairbanks	Fairbanks North Star Borough	-
460	Fairbanks	Fairbanks North Star Borough	July 22, 1999
461	Valdez	Chugach Census Area	July 30, 2007
463	Juneau	City and Borough of Juneau	-
464	Ekwok	Dillingham Census Area	-
465	Juneau	City and Borough of Juneau	-
466	Nome	Nome Census Area	February 15, 2010
467	Aniak	Bethel Census Area	-
468	Ruby	Yukon–Koyukuk Census Area	-
469	King Salmon	Bristol Bay Borough	April 14, 2009
470	Wrangell	City and Borough of Wrangell	July 12, 2006
471	Kalskag	Bethel Census Area	-
472	Whittier	Chugach Census Area	-
473	Shageluk	Yukon–Koyukuk Census Area	-
474	Fairbanks	Fairbanks North Star Borough	-
475	Kiana	Northwest Arctic Borough	-
476	Holy Cross	Yukon–Koyukuk Census Area	-
477	Kasigluk	Bethel Census Area	-
478	Stevens Village	Yukon–Koyukuk Census Area	-
479	Fairbanks	Fairbanks North Star Borough	-
480	Prudhoe Bay	North Slope Borough	-
481	Kodiak	Kodiak Island Borough	November 20, 1998
482	Fort Wainwright	Fairbanks North Star Borough	September 18, 2014
483	North Pole	Fairbanks North Star Borough	September 28, 2017
484	Selawik	Northwest Arctic Borough	-
485	Noatak	Northwest Arctic Borough	-
486	Kodiak	Kodiak Island Borough	-
487	Kodiak	Kodiak Island Borough	-
488	North Pole	Fairbanks North Star Borough	-
489	Point Baker	Prince of Wales-Hyder Census Area	-
490	North Pole	Fairbanks North Star Borough	January 10, 1996
491	Seward	Kenai Peninsula Borough	January 10, 1996
493	Togiak	Dillingham Census Area	-
494	Buckland	Northwest Arctic Borough	-
495	Willow	Matanuska-Susitna Borough	-
496	Fairbanks	Fairbanks North Star Borough	May 18, 1998
497	King Cove	Aleutians East Borough	-
498	Alakanuk	Kusilvak Census Area	-
500	Juneau	City and Borough of Juneau	December 6, 2005
502	Talkeetna	Matanuska-Susitna Borough	June 10, 2019
503	Wasilla	Matanuska-Susitna Borough	March 18, 2021
504	Nome	Nome Census Area	March 18, 2021
505	Tok	Southeast Fairbanks Census Area	July 25, 2006
510	Ketchikan	Ketchikan Gateway Borough	March 18, 2021
512	Kodiak	Kodiak Island Borough	March 30, 2007
513	Kenai	Kenai Peninsula Borough	July 6, 2015
515	Haines	Haines Borough	March 12, 2012
518	Petersburg	Petersburg Borough	July 25, 2006
519	Anchorage	City and Borough of Anchorage	September 4, 2015
520	Central	Yukon–Koyukuk Census Area	-
521	Wasilla	Matanuska-Susitna Borough	November 29, 2012
522	Anchorage	City and Borough of Anchorage	-
523	Juneau	City and Borough of Juneau	September 14, 2001
524	McGrath	Yukon–Koyukuk Census Area	-
525	Togiak	Dillingham Census Area	-
526	Sleetmute	Bethel Census Area	-
527	Nunapitchuk	Bethel Census Area	-
528	Kodiak	Kodiak Island Borough	-
529	Anchorage	City and Borough of Anchorage	January 10, 1996
530	Klawock	Prince of Wales-Hyder Census Area	-
531	Anchorage	City and Borough of Anchorage	September 3, 2019
532	Cold Bay	Aleutians East Borough	-
533	Levelock	Lake and Peninsula Borough	-
534	Kaltag	Yukon–Koyukuk Census Area	-
535	Eagle River	City and Borough of Anchorage	March 18, 2021
536	Eek	Bethel Census Area	-
537	Sleetmute	Bethel Census Area	-
538	Anchorage	City and Borough of Anchorage	October 31, 2000
539	Kodiak	Kodiak Island Borough	September 19, 2005
540	Girdwood	City and Borough of Anchorage	September 17, 2007
541	Bettles	Yukon–Koyukuk Census Area	-
542	Meyers Chuck	City and Borough of Wrangell	-
543	Bethel	Bethel Census Area	-
544	Bethel	Bethel Census Area	April 15, 1996
545	Kwethluk	Bethel Census Area	August 3, 2007
546	Saint Paul Island	Aleutians West Census Area	-
547	Eagle	Southeast Fairbanks Census Area	-
548	False Pass	Aleutians East Borough	-
549	Pilot Station	Kusilvak Census Area	-
550	Anchorage	City and Borough of Anchorage	October 11, 1997
551	Elmendorf Air Force Base	City and Borough of Anchorage	May 18, 1998
552	Elmendorf Air Force Base	City and Borough of Anchorage	-
553	Nunapitchuk	Bethel Census Area	-
554	Chitina	Copper River Census Area	July 4, 1995
556	Quinhagak	Bethel Census Area	-
557	Kwigillingok	Bethel Census Area	-
558	Scammon Bay	Kusilvak Census Area	-
559	Point Baker	Prince of Wales-Hyder Census Area	-
561	Anchorage	City and Borough of Anchorage	-
562	Anchorage	City and Borough of Anchorage	-
563	Anchorage	City and Borough of Anchorage	-
564	Anchorage	City and Borough of Anchorage	-
565	Anchorage	City and Borough of Anchorage	-
566	Anchorage	City and Borough of Anchorage	-
567	Anchor Point	Kenai Peninsula Borough	-
568	Port Alexander	Petersburg Borough	-
569	Anchorage	City and Borough of Anchorage	April 1, 1997
570	Anchorage	City and Borough of Anchorage	April 1, 1997
571	Iliamna	Lake and Peninsula Borough	-
572	Adak	Aleutians West Census Area	May 5, 2008
573	Seward	Kenai Peninsula Borough	-
574	Nikolai	Aleutians West Census Area	July 13, 2007
575	Anchorage	City and Borough of Anchorage	-
576	Nikolski	Aleutians West Census Area	-
577	Adak	Aleutians West Census Area	May 6, 2009
580	Elmendorf Air Force Base	City and Borough of Anchorage	May 18, 1998
581	Unalaska	Aleutians West Census Area	-
582	Clear	Denali Borough	-
583	Tyonek	Kenai Peninsula Borough	-
584	Russian Mission	Kusilvak Census Area	-
585	Clear	Denali Borough	-
586	Juneau	City and Borough of Juneau	-
587	Arctic Village	Yukon–Koyukuk Census Area	-
588	Kwigillingok	Bethel Census Area	-
589	Napakiak	Bethel Census Area	-
590	Fairbanks	Fairbanks North Star Borough	October 13, 1999
591	Mountain Village	Kusilvak Census Area	-
592	Atka	Aleutians West Census Area	-
594	Port Alexander	Petersburg Borough	-
595	Cooper Landing	Kenai Peninsula Borough	-
596	New Stuyahok	Dillingham Census Area	-
597	Cooper Landing	Kenai Peninsula Borough	April 25, 2016
598	Soldotna	Kenai Peninsula Borough	October 11, 1997
599	Cooper Landing	Kenai Peninsula Borough	November 20, 1998
600	Anchorage	City and Borough of Anchorage	May 19, 2021
602	Anchorage	City and Borough of Anchorage	July 25, 2006
606	Willow	Matanuska-Susitna Borough	April 2, 2019
612	Skagway	Borough of Skagway	July 25, 2006
616	Delta Junction	Southeast Fairbanks Census Area	December 3, 2013
617	Ketchikan	Ketchikan Gateway Borough	September 15, 2003
622	Eagle River	City and Borough of Anchorage	January 10, 1996
623	Sitka	City and Borough of Sitka	March 30, 2007
624	Unalakleet	Nome Census Area	-
625	Unalakleet	Nome Census Area	July 13, 2007
628	Beaver	Yukon–Koyukuk Census Area	-
629	Coffman Cove	Ketchikan Gateway Borough	-
631	Wasilla	Matanuska-Susitna Borough	March 30, 2007
632	Anchorage	City and Borough of Anchorage	October 6, 2004
633	Atqasuk	North Slope Borough	-
634	Wales	Nome Census Area	February 21, 2008
635	Anchorage	City and Borough of Anchorage	November 6, 2001
636	Noorvik	Northwest Arctic Borough	-
638	White Mountain	Nome Census Area	-
639	Shishmaref	Nome Census Area	February 21, 2008
640	Kaktovik	North Slope Borough	-
642	Teller	Nome Census Area	-
643	Teller	Nome Census Area	February 21, 2008
644	Anchorage	City and Borough of Anchorage	October 31, 2000
645	Kivalina	Northwest Arctic Borough	-
646	Anchorage	City and Borough of Anchorage	October 31, 2000
647	Tununak	Bethel Census Area	-
649	Shishmaref	Nome Census Area	-
650	Petersburg	Petersburg Borough	October 24, 2008
651	North Pole	Fairbanks North Star Borough	May 18, 2017
652	Tununak	Bethel Census Area	-
653	Hope	Kenai Peninsula Borough	-
654	Kodiak	Kodiak Island Borough	March 3, 2001
655	Minto	Yukon–Koyukuk Census Area	-
656	Galena	Yukon–Koyukuk Census Area	-
657	Juneau	City and Borough of Juneau	March 18, 2021
658	White Mountain	Nome Census Area	February 21, 2008
659	Prudhoe Bay	North Slope Borough	-
660	Wrangell	City and Borough of Wrangell	October 24, 2008
661	Anaktuvuk Pass	North Slope Borough	-
662	Fort Yukon	Yukon–Koyukuk Census Area	-
663	Anvik	Yukon–Koyukuk Census Area	-
664	Wales	Nome Census Area	-
665	White Mountain	Nome Census Area	-
669	Eielson Air Force Base	Fairbanks North Star Borough	September 18, 2014
670	Prudhoe Bay	North Slope Borough	October 13, 1999
671	Wasilla	Matanuska-Susitna Borough	September 4, 2015
672	Manley Hot Springs	Yukon–Koyukuk Census Area	-
674	Lake Minchumina	Yukon–Koyukuk Census Area	-
675	Aniak	Bethel Census Area	-
676	Aniak	Bethel Census Area	July 4, 1995
677	Anchorage	City and Borough of Anchorage	July 4, 1995
678	Bettles	Yukon–Koyukuk Census Area	-
679	Marshall	Kusilvak Census Area	-
680	Ouzinkie	Kodiak Island Borough	-
681	Prudhoe Bay	North Slope Borough	March 18, 2021
683	Healy	Denali Borough	-
684	Wales	Nome Census Area	February 21, 2008
685	Kwethluk	Bethel Census Area	July 30, 2007
686	Wales	Nome Census Area	-
687	Fairbanks	Fairbanks North Star Borough	August 19, 2005
688	Chugiak	City and Borough of Anchorage	-
689	Eagle River	City and Borough of Anchorage	-
690	Kenai	Kenai Peninsula Borough	August 12, 2005
691	Eagle River	City and Borough of Anchorage	August 24, 2010
692	Bettles	Yukon–Koyukuk Census Area	-
693	New Stuyahok	Dillingham Census Area	-
694	Eagle River	City and Borough of Anchorage	-
695	Akiak	Bethel Census Area	-
696	Eagle River	City and Borough of Anchorage	-
697	Gustavus	Hoonah-Angoon Census Area	-
698	Akutan	Aleutians East Borough	-
699	Fairbanks	Fairbanks North Star Borough	December 5, 2002
707	Palmer	Matanuska-Susitna Borough	October 2, 2009
709	Huslia	Yukon–Koyukuk Census Area	December 21, 2017
710	Glennallen	Copper River Census Area	November 20, 2008
712	Fairbanks	Fairbanks North Star Borough	August 20, 2000
713	Juneau	City and Borough of Juneau	August 20, 2000
714	Soldotna	Kenai Peninsula Borough	June 13, 2000
715	Wasilla	Matanuska-Susitna Borough	June 2, 2003
717	Eagle River	City and Borough of Anchorage	February 4, 2008
720	Anchorage	City and Borough of Anchorage	September 20, 2004
721	King Salmon	Bristol Bay Borough	-
722	Hughes	Yukon–Koyukuk Census Area	-
723	Juneau	City and Borough of Juneau	January 10, 1996
724	Wales	Nome Census Area	-
726	Eagle River	City and Borough of Anchorage	August 11, 2006
727	Anchorage	City and Borough of Anchorage	November 20, 1998
728	Takotna	Yukon–Koyukuk Census Area	-
729	Anchorage	City and Borough of Anchorage	October 15, 1996
730	Wasilla	Matanuska-Susitna Borough	October 13, 1999
731	Sleetmute	Bethel Census Area	-
733	Talkeetna	Matanuska-Susitna Borough	-
734	Northway	Southeast Fairbanks Census Area	January 25, 1998
735	Pelican	Hoonah-Angoon Census Area	-
736	Tenakee Springs	Hoonah-Angoon Census Area	-
737	Napakiak	Bethel Census Area	-
738	Sitka	City and Borough of Sitka	January 10, 1996
739	Elim	Nome Census Area	February 21, 2008
740	Kenai	Kenai Peninsula Borough	October 16, 2006
741	Soldotna	Kenai Peninsula Borough	October 13, 2006
742	Anchorage	City and Borough of Anchorage	August 14, 1998
743	Anchorage	City and Borough of Anchorage	October 31, 2000
744	Anchorage	City and Borough of Anchorage	October 13, 1999
745	Palmer	Matanuska-Susitna Borough	-
746	Palmer	Matanuska-Susitna Borough	-
747	Sitka	City and Borough of Sitka	-
748	Anchorage	City and Borough of Anchorage	October 11, 1997
749	Chignik Lake	Lake and Peninsula Borough	-
750	North Pole	Fairbanks North Star Borough	December 30, 2004
751	Anchorage	City and Borough of Anchorage	July 4, 1995
752	Sitka	City and Borough of Sitka	September 11, 1994
753	Elmendorf Air Force Base	City and Borough of Anchorage	-
754	Girdwood	City and Borough of Anchorage	-
755	Klawock	Prince of Wales-Hyder Census Area	-
756	Homer	Kenai Peninsula Borough	October 16, 2006
757	Kwethluk	Bethel Census Area	-
758	Hooper Bay	Kusilvak Census Area	-
759	Point Hope	North Slope Borough	July 9, 2008
761	Palmer	Matanuska-Susitna Borough	January 10, 1996
762	Anchorage	City and Borough of Anchorage	-
763	Wainwright	North Slope Borough	-
764	Anchorage	City and Borough of Anchorage	September 26, 2001
765	Akiak	Bethel Census Area	-
766	Haines	Haines Borough	-
767	Haines	Haines Borough	-
768	Cantwell	Denali Borough	February 3, 2005
769	Seward	Kenai Peninsula Borough	October 13, 2006
770	Anchorage	City and Borough of Anchorage	October 11, 1997
771	Anchorage	City and Borough of Anchorage	August 22, 2006
772	Petersburg	Petersburg Borough	-
773	Circle	Yukon–Koyukuk Census Area	-
774	Northway	Southeast Fairbanks Census Area	-
775	Palmer	Matanuska-Susitna Borough	March 3, 2001
776	Nikiski	Kenai Peninsula Borough	-
777	Anchorage	City and Borough of Anchorage	January 10, 1996
778	Northway	Southeast Fairbanks Census Area	-
779	White Mountain	Nome Census Area	-
780	Juneau	City and Borough of Juneau	-
781	Port Alsworth	Lake and Peninsula Borough	-
782	Anchorage	City and Borough of Anchorage	-
783	Girdwood	City and Borough of Anchorage	-
784	Yakutat	City and Borough of Yakutat	-
785	Kake	Petersburg Borough	-
786	Anchorage	City and Borough of Anchorage	-
787	Anchorage	City and Borough of Anchorage	-
788	Angoon	Hoonah-Angoon Census Area	-
789	Juneau	City and Borough of Juneau	-
790	Juneau	City and Borough of Juneau	-
791	Fort Richardson	City and Borough of Anchorage	September 18, 2014
792	Anchorage	City and Borough of Anchorage	July 4, 1995
793	Anchorage	City and Borough of Anchorage	July 4, 1995
794	Platinum	Bethel Census Area	-
795	Palmer	Matanuska-Susitna Borough	July 15, 2014
796	Juneau	City and Borough of Juneau	March 3, 2001
797	Pilot Point	Lake and Peninsula Borough	-
798	Minto	Yukon–Koyukuk Census Area	-
799	Fairbanks	Fairbanks North Star Borough	October 13, 2006
802	Anchorage	City and Borough of Anchorage	September 28, 2018
803	Delta Junction	Southeast Fairbanks Census Area	February 7, 2008
810	Delta Junction	Southeast Fairbanks Census Area	February 21, 2012
815	Skagway	Borough of Skagway	March 12, 2012
821	Ketchikan	Ketchikan Gateway Borough	September 5, 2006
822	Glennallen	Copper River Census Area	-
823	Chitina	Copper River Census Area	-
824	Anaktuvuk Pass	North Slope Borough	-
825	Akiachak	Bethel Census Area	-
826	Craig	Prince of Wales-Hyder Census Area	-
827	Mekoryuk	Bethel Census Area	-
828	Meyers Chuck	City and Borough of Wrangell	-
829	Huslia	Yukon–Koyukuk Census Area	-
830	Anchorage	City and Borough of Anchorage	October 13, 1999
831	Valdez	Chugach Census Area	-
832	Nenana	Denali Borough	-
833	Point Lay	North Slope Borough	-
834	Valdez	Chugach Census Area	September 11, 1994
835	Valdez	Chugach Census Area	-
836	Old Harbor	Kodiak Island Borough	-
837	Chignik Lagoon	Lake and Peninsula Borough	-
839	Atka	Aleutians West Census Area	-
840	Chignik Lagoon	Lake and Peninsula Borough	-
841	Wasilla	Matanuska-Susitna Borough	May 18, 1998
842	Dillingham	Dillingham Census Area	-
843	Dillingham	Dillingham Census Area	April 14, 2009
845	Chignik	Lake and Peninsula Borough	-
846	Coffman Cove	Ketchikan Gateway Borough	-
847	Larsen Bay	Kodiak Island Borough	-
848	Chalkyistik	Yukon–Koyukuk Census Area	-
849	Venetie	Yukon–Koyukuk Census Area	-
850	Pedro Bay	Lake and Peninsula Borough	-
852	Barrow (Utqiagvik)	North Slope Borough	-
853	Perryville	Lake and Peninsula Borough	-
854	Eagle River	City and Borough of Anchorage	August 12, 2005
855	Atqasuk	North Slope Borough	April 14, 2009
858	Chevak	Kusilvak Census Area	-
859	St. George Island	Aleutians West Census Area	-
861	Palmer	Matanuska-Susitna Borough	October 13, 1999
862	Eagle River	City and Borough of Anchorage	November 20, 1998
863	Wasilla	Matanuska-Susitna Borough	February 27, 1999
864	Eagle River	City and Borough of Anchorage	October 13, 1999
865	Anchorage	City and Borough of Anchorage	January 23, 2006
866	Gustavus	Hoonah-Angoon Census Area	-
867	Chefornak	Bethel Census Area	-
868	Anchorage	City and Borough of Anchorage	October 11, 1997
869	Delta Junction	Southeast Fairbanks Census Area	-
872	Unalaska	Aleutians West Census Area	June 29, 2018
873	Delta Junction	Southeast Fairbanks Census Area	-
874	Wrangell	City and Borough of Wrangell	-
876	Delta Junction	Southeast Fairbanks Census Area	July 4, 1995
878	Barrow (Utqiagvik)	North Slope Borough	November 20, 1998
880	Elim	Nome Census Area	February 21, 2008
882	Tanacross	Southeast Fairbanks Census Area	-
883	Tok	Southeast Fairbanks Census Area	-
884	Anchorage	City and Borough of Anchorage	March 3, 2001
885	Anchorage	City and Borough of Anchorage	August 1, 2014
886	Metlakatla	Prince of Wales-Hyder Census Area	-
887	Anchorage	City and Borough of Anchorage	-
888	Fairbanks	Fairbanks North Star Borough	-
889	Hughes	Yukon–Koyukuk Census Area	-
890	Elim	Nome Census Area	-
891	Anchorage	City and Borough of Anchorage	December 27, 2007
892	Houston	Matanuska-Susitna Borough	-
895	Delta Junction	Southeast Fairbanks Census Area	-
896	Kipnuk	Lake and Peninsula Borough	-
898	Nulato	Yukon–Koyukuk Census Area	-
899	Kotlik	Kusilvak Census Area	-
903	Anchorage	City and Borough of Anchorage	March 27, 2008
917	Anchorage	City and Borough of Anchorage	February 9, 2018
921	Anchorage	City and Borough of Anchorage	-
923	St. Michael	Nome Census Area	-
925	Wainwright	North Slope Borough	July 9, 2008
927	Koyukuk	Yukon–Koyukuk Census Area	-
928	Anchorage	City and Borough of Anchorage	January 30, 2006
929	Anchorage	City and Borough of Anchorage	October 11, 1997
931	Anchorage	City and Borough of Anchorage	September 4, 2020
932	Cantwell	Denali Borough	February 11, 1995
933	Stebbins	Nome Census Area	February 21, 2008
934	Stebbins	Nome Census Area	-
936	Anchorage	City and Borough of Anchorage	-
940	Tok	Southeast Fairbanks Census Area	July 25, 2006
942	Kodiak	Kodiak Island Borough	July 25, 2006
943	Prudhoe Bay	North Slope Borough	November 20, 1998
944	Stebbins	Nome Census Area	February 21, 2008
945	Hoonah	Hoonah-Angoon Census Area	-
946	Meyers Chuck	City and Borough of Wrangell	-
947	Anchorage	City and Borough of Anchorage	October 5, 2007
948	Kobuk	Northwest Arctic Borough	-
949	Emmonak	Kusilvak Census Area	-
952	Anchorage	City and Borough of Anchorage	March 21, 2003
953	Soldotna	Kenai Peninsula Borough	March 21, 2003
955	Shaktoolik	Nome Census Area	-
956	Shaktoolik	Nome Census Area	February 21, 2008
957	Juneau	City and Borough of Juneau	January 16, 2003
960	Glennallen	Copper River Census Area	February 21, 2006
963	Koyuk	Nome Census Area	-
964	Koyuk	Nome Census Area	February 21, 2008
965	Craig	Prince of Wales-Hyder Census Area	July 12, 2006
966	Sitka	City and Borough of Sitka	-
967	Goodnews Bay	Bethel Census Area	-
968	Allakaket	Yukon–Koyukuk Census Area	-
973	Skagway	Borough of Skagway	July 12, 2006
978	Fairbanks	Fairbanks North Star Borough	December 30, 2002
979	Platinum	Bethel Census Area	-
980	Anchorage	City and Borough of Anchorage	August 24, 2005
982	Palmer	Matanuska-Susitna Borough	August 12, 2005
983	Skagway	Borough of Skagway	-
984	Savoonga	Nome Census Area	-
985	Gambell	Nome Census Area	-
987	Fairbanks	Fairbanks North Star Borough	November 29, 2012
988	Wrangell	City and Borough of Wrangell	October 28, 2002
989	Sand Point	Nome Census Area	-
992	Anchorage	City and Borough of Anchorage	January 25, 1998
995	Kotzebue	Northwest Arctic Borough	September 25, 2008

== See also ==
- List of North American Numbering Plan area codes

Alaska area codes: 907
	North: Arctic Ocean, Russia	
West: Russia	907	East: 250, 236/672/778, 867
	South: Pacific Ocean, 808	
British Columbia area codes: 250, 604, 236/257/672/778
Hawaii area codes: 808
Yukon, Northwest Territories and Nunavut area codes: 867
