= Napakiak, Alaska =

Napakiak Naparyarraq
- City
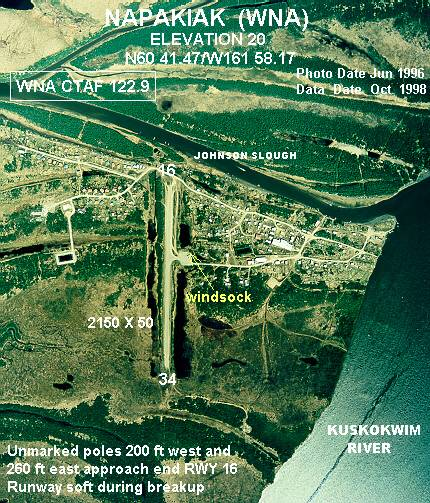
- Aerial view of Napakiak

- Location in Alaska
- Coordinates: 60°41′36″N 161°58′25″W
- Country: United States
- State: Alaska
- Census Area: Bethel
- Incorporated: October 19, 1970

Government
  - Mayor: Elsie Chris
  - State senator: Lyman Hoffman (D)
  - State rep.: Conrad McCormick (D)

Area
  - Total: 2.10 sq mi (5.45 km^{2})
  - Land: 2.01 sq mi (5.21 km^{2})
  - Water: 0.093 sq mi (0.24 km^{2})
- Elevation: 9.8 ft (3 m)

Population (2020)
  - Total: 358
  - Density: 178.0/sq mi (68.72/km^{2})
- Time zone: UTC-9 (Alaska (AKST))
  - Summer (DST): UTC-8 (AKDT)
- ZIP code: 99634
- Area code: 907
- FIPS code: 02-52390
- GNIS feature ID: 1406829

Napakiak (Central Yupik: Naparyarraq) is a city in Bethel Census Area, Alaska, United States. As of the 2020 census, Napakiak had a population of 358.

== Geography ==
Napakiak is located at 60°41′36″N 161°58′25″W (60.693282, -161.973491), on the north bank of the Kuskokwim River, approximately 10 miles (16 km) downriver (southwest) of Bethel.

According to the United States Census Bureau, the city has a total area of 5.0 square miles (13.0 km^{2}), of which 4.4 square miles (11.4 km^{2}) is land and 0.62 square miles (1.6 km^{2}), or 12.26%, is water.

== Demographics ==
Historical population
Census	Pop.	Note	%±
1880	98		—
1900	197		—
1910	166		−15.7%
1920	173		4.2%
1940	113		—
1950	139		23.0%
1960	190		36.7%
1970	259		36.3%
1980	262		1.2%
1990	318		21.4%
2000	353		11.0%
2010	354		0.3%
2020	358		1.1%
U.S. Decennial Census

Napakiak first appeared on the 1880 U.S. Census as the unincorporated Inuit village of "Napahaiagamute." All 98 residents were of the Inuit tribe. It next returned in 1900 as the village of "Naparegarak." In 1910, it returned as Napakiak (with the alternative 1880 name of Napahaiagamute). In 1920, it returned as "Napakiakamute." It did not appear on the 1930 census. It next appeared again in 1940 and in every successive census to date as Napakiak. It formally incorporated in 1970.

=== 2020 census ===
As of the 2020 census, Napakiak had a population of 358. The median age was 26.0 years. 33.8% of residents were under the age of 18 and 9.5% of residents were 65 years of age or older. For every 100 females there were 104.6 males, and for every 100 females age 18 and over there were 113.5 males age 18 and over.

0.0% of residents lived in urban areas, while 100.0% lived in rural areas.

There were 103 households in Napakiak, of which 53.4% had children under the age of 18 living in them. Of all households, 32.0% were married-couple households, 33.0% were households with a male householder and no spouse or partner present, and 21.4% were households with a female householder and no spouse or partner present. About 21.4% of all households were made up of individuals and 7.8% had someone living alone who was 65 years of age or older.

There were 115 housing units, of which 10.4% were vacant. The homeowner vacancy rate was 1.4% and the rental vacancy rate was 0.0%.

Racial composition as of the 2020 census
Race	Number	Percent
White	14	3.9%
Black or African American	2	0.6%
American Indian and Alaska Native	325	90.8%
Asian	1	0.3%
Native Hawaiian and Other Pacific Islander	0	0.0%
Some other race	0	0.0%
Two or more races	16	4.5%
Hispanic or Latino (of any race)	0	0.0%

=== 2000 census ===
As of the census of 2000, there were 353 people, 90 households, and 71 families residing in the city. The population density was 75.2 inhabitants per square mile (29.0/km^{2}). There were 101 housing units at an average density of 21.5 units per square mile (8.3 units/km^{2}). The racial makeup of the city was 1.42% White, 1.70% Black or African American, 96.03% Native American, and 0.85% from two or more races. 0.28% of the population were Hispanic or Latino of any race. Most of the residents are Yup'ik people. The sale, importation or possession of alcohol is forbidden in the village.

There were 90 households, out of which 48.9% had children under the age of 18 living with them, 53.3% were married couples living together, 18.9% had a female householder with no husband present, and 21.1% were non-families. 16.7% of all households were made up of individuals, and 4.4% had someone living alone who was 65 years of age or older. The average household size was 3.92 and the average family size was 4.52.

In the city, the age distribution of the population shows 38.8% under the age of 18, 9.1% from 18 to 24, 27.8% from 25 to 44, 17.0% from 45 to 64, and 7.4% who were 65 years of age or older. The median age was 26 years. For every 100 females, there were 130.7 males. For every 100 females age 18 and over, there were 109.7 males.

The median income for a household in the city was $28,750, and the median income for a family was $29,167. Males had a median income of $26,250 versus $43,750 for females. The per capita income for the city was $7,319. About 16.2% of families and 20.2% of the population were below the poverty line, including 20.7% of those under age 18 and 9.1% of those age 65 or over.

== Education ==
Lower Kuskokwim School District operates the William N. Miller School, PreK-12. As of 2018 it has 96 students.

== Health ==
Sale, importation and possession of alcohol are banned in the village.

== Infrastructure ==
Napakiak is the terminus of a unique 8.5-mile (13.7 km) prototype single-wire earth return electrical intertie from Bethel, Alaska, constructed in 1981.
