= Manokotak, Alaska =

Manokotak Manuquutaq
- City
- Location in Alaska
- Coordinates: 58°58′52″N 159°3′21″W
- Country: United States
- State: Alaska
- Census Area: Dillingham
- Incorporated: October 19, 1970

Government
  - Mayor: Melvin Andrew
  - State senator: Lyman Hoffman (D)
  - State rep.: Bryce Edgmon (I)

Area
  - Total: 108.44 sq mi (280.87 km^{2})
  - Land: 73.14 sq mi (189.43 km^{2})
  - Water: 35.31 sq mi (91.45 km^{2})
- Elevation: 16 ft (5 m)

Population (2020)
  - Total: 488
  - Density: 6.7/sq mi (2.58/km^{2})
- Time zone: UTC-9 (Alaska (AKST))
  - Summer (DST): UTC-8 (AKDT)
- ZIP code: 99628
- Area code: 907
- FIPS code: 02-46890
- GNIS feature ID: 1405927

Manokotak (Central Yupik: Manuquutaq) is a city in Dillingham Census Area, Alaska, United States. As of the 2020 census, Manokotak had a population of 488.

== Geography ==
Manokotak is located at 58°58′52″N 159°3′21″W (58.981087, -159.055808).

According to the United States Census Bureau, the city has a total area of 37.1 square miles (96.2 km^{2}), of which 35.8 square miles (92.6 km^{2}) is land and 1.4 square miles (3.6 km^{2}), or 3.79%, is water.

== Demographics ==
Historical population
| Census | Pop. | Note | %± |
|---|---|---|---|
| 1950 | 120 | | — |
| 1960 | 149 | | 24.2% |
| 1970 | 214 | | 43.6% |
| 1980 | 294 | | 37.4% |
| 1990 | 385 | | 31.0% |
| 2000 | 399 | | 3.6% |
| 2010 | 442 | | 10.8% |
| 2020 | 488 | | 10.4% |
U.S. Decennial Census

Manokotak first appeared on the 1950 U.S. Census as an unincorporated village. It formally incorporated in 1970.

=== 2020 census ===
As of the 2020 census, Manokotak had a population of 488. The median age was 28.4 years. 33.4% of residents were under the age of 18 and 7.0% of residents were 65 years of age or older. For every 100 females there were 104.2 males, and for every 100 females age 18 and over there were 112.4 males age 18 and over.

0.0% of residents lived in urban areas, while 100.0% lived in rural areas.

There were 133 households in Manokotak, of which 47.4% had children under the age of 18 living in them. Of all households, 33.1% were married-couple households, 33.1% were households with a male householder and no spouse or partner present, and 24.1% were households with a female householder and no spouse or partner present. About 26.3% of all households were made up of individuals and 5.3% had someone living alone who was 65 years of age or older.

There were 225 housing units, of which 40.9% were vacant. The homeowner vacancy rate was 1.0% and the rental vacancy rate was 5.3%.

Racial composition as of the 2020 census
| Race | Number | Percent |
|---|---|---|
| White | 18 | 3.7% |
| Black or African American | 0 | 0.0% |
| American Indian and Alaska Native | 445 | 91.2% |
| Asian | 0 | 0.0% |
| Native Hawaiian and Other Pacific Islander | 0 | 0.0% |
| Some other race | 0 | 0.0% |
| Two or more races | 25 | 5.1% |
| Hispanic or Latino (of any race) | 5 | 1.0% |

=== 2000 census ===
There were 93 households, out of which 55.9% had children under the age of 18 living with them, 67.7% were married couples living together, 11.8% had a female householder with no husband present, and 17.2% were non-families. 15.1% of all households were made up of individuals, and none had someone living alone who was 65 years of age or older. The average household size was 4.29 and the average family size was 4.92.

In the village the age distribution of the population shows 44.4% under the age of 18, 10.8% from 18 to 24, 24.8% from 25 to 44, 15.0% from 45 to 64, and 5.0% who were 65 years of age or older. The median age was 22 years. For every 100 females, there were 116.8 males. For every 100 females age 18 and over, there were 133.7 males.

The median income for a household in the village was $26,875, and the median income for a family was $30,357. Males had a median income of $13,125 versus $0 for females. The per capita income for the city was $9,294. About 32.5% of families and 35.3% of the population were below the poverty line, including 44.0% of those under age 18 and none of those age 65 or over.

== Notable people ==
- Thomas O. Madole, Village Public Safety Officer (VPSO) that was murdered in the line of duty by Manokotak resident Leroy B. Dick Jr. The murder of Officer Madole led to significant changes in Alaska's VPSO program, including the passage of legislation to allow VPSOs to carry firearms.
- Don Page (born 1948), theoretical physicist, grew up in Manokotak where his parents taught elementary school

== Education ==
The Manokotak "Nunaniq" School of the Southwest Region School District serves the village.

== Health ==
Sale, importation and possession of alcohol are banned in the village.
