= Central Alaskan Yupʼik =

Language of the Yupik family

Central Alaskan Yupik
- Yupʼik
- Yugtun, Cugtun
- Native to: United States
- Region: western and southwestern Alaska
- Ethnicity: Central Alaskan Yupik people
- Native speakers: 19,750 (2013)
- Language family: Eskaleut: Eskimo; Yupik; Central Alaskan Yupik
- Early forms: Proto-Eskimo–Aleut: Proto-Eskimo; Proto-Yupik
- Dialects: Yugtun (Yukon-Kuskokwim); Cupʼik (Chevak); Cupʼig (Nunivak)
- Writing system: Latin, formerly the Yugtun syllabary

Official status
- Official language in: Alaska

Language codes
- ISO 639-3: esu
- Glottolog: cent2127
- ELP: Central Alaskan Yup'ik
- Central Alaskan Yupik is classified as Vulnerable by the UNESCO Atlas of the World's Languages in Danger.

Central Alaskan Yupʼik (also rendered Yupik, Central Yupik, or indigenously Yugtun) is one of the languages of the Yupik family, in turn a member of the Eskaleut language group, spoken in western and southwestern Alaska. Both in ethnic population and in number of speakers, the Central Alaskan Yupik people form the largest group among Alaska Natives. As of 2010 Yupʼik was, after Navajo, the second most spoken aboriginal language in the United States. Yupʼik should not be confused with the related language Central Siberian Yupik spoken in Chukotka and St. Lawrence Island, nor Naukan Yupik likewise spoken in Chukotka.

Yupʼik, like all Eskaleut languages, is polysynthetic and uses suffixation as primary means for word formation. There are a great number of derivational suffixes (termed postbases) that are used productively to form these polysynthetic words. Yupʼik has predominantly ergative alignment: case marking follows the ergative pattern for the most part, but verb agreement can follow an ergative or an accusative pattern, depending on grammatical mood. The language grammatically distinguishes three numbers: singular, dual, and plural. There is no marking of grammatical gender in the language, nor are there articles.

== Language name ==
The Yup'ik language goes by various names. Since it is a geographically central member of the Yupik languages and is spoken in Alaska, the language is often referred to as Central Alaskan Yupik (for example, in Miyaoka's 2012 grammar of the language). The term Yup'ik [jupːik] is a common endonym, and is derived from /juɣ-piɣ/ "person-genuine". The Alaska Native Language Center and Jacobson's (1995) learner's grammar use Central (Alaskan) Yup'ik, which can be seen as a hybrid of the former two terms; there is, however, potential for confusion here: Central (Alaskan) Yup'ik may refer to either the language as a whole, or the geographically central dialect of the language, more commonly called General Central Yup'ik.

Other endonyms are used regionally: Cup'ig in the Nunivak dialect, Cup'ik in Chevak (these terms are cognate with Yup'ik, but represent the pronunciation of the word in the respective dialect), and Yugtun in the Yukon-Kuskokwim region.

== Geographic distribution and use ==
Yupʼik is spoken primarily in southwestern Alaska, from Norton Sound in the north to the Alaska Peninsula in the south, and from Lake Iliamna in the east to Nunivak Island in the west. Yup'ik lies geographically central relative to the other members of the Yupik language family: Alutiiq ~ Sugpiaq is spoken to south and east, and Central Siberian Yupik is spoken to the west on St. Lawrence Island (often called St. Lawrence Island Yupik in the Alaskan context) and on the Chukotka peninsula, where Naukan Yupik is also spoken. Yup'ik is bordered to the north by the more distantly related Iñupiaq language; the difference between Yupʼik and Iñupiaq is comparable to that of the difference between Spanish and French.

Of a total population of more than 23,000 people, more than 14,000 are speakers of the language. Children still grow up speaking Yupʼik as their first language in 17 of 68 Yupʼik villages, those mainly located on the lower Kuskokwim River, on Nelson Island, and along the coast between the Kuskokwim River and Nelson Island. The variety of Yup'ik spoken by the younger generations is being influenced strongly by English: it is less synthetic, has a reduced inventory of spatial demonstratives, and is lexically Anglicized.

== Dialects ==
Yup'ik is typically considered to have five dialects: Norton Sound, General Central Yup'ik, Nunivak, Hooper Bay-Chevak, and the extinct Egegik dialect. All extant dialects of the language are mutually intelligible, albeit with phonological and lexical differences that sometimes cause difficulty in cross-dialectal comprehension. Lexical differences exist somewhat dramatically across dialects, in part due to a historical practice of name taboo. Speakers may be reluctant to take on the lexicon of another dialect because they "often feel proud of their own dialects".

The Yupʼik dialects, sub-dialects and their locations are as follows:

- Yup'ik
  - Norton Sound (alternatively, Unaliq-Pastuliq); spoken around Norton Sound
    1. Unaliq sub-dialect; spoken by Unalirmiut (= Atnegmiut, Kuuyuŋmiut, Eŋlutaleġmiut etc.) tribes in Elim (Neviarcaurluq), Golovin (Cingik), St. Michael (Taciq)
    2. Kotlik sub-dialect; spoken by the Pastulirmiut tribe in Kotlik (Qerrulliik)
  - General Central Yupʼik (Yugtun); spoken on Nelson Island, on the Yukon-Kuskokwim delta, and in the Bristol Bay region of Alaska
    1. Core dialects; spoken on the lower Kuskokwim, on the coast up to Nelson Island, and in Bristol Bay
      1. Lower Kuskokwim sub-dialect; spoken in Akiachak (Akiacuaq), Akiak (Akiaq), Atmautluak (Atmaulluaq), Bethel (Mamterilleq), Eek (Ekvicuaq), Goodnews Bay (Mamterat), Upper Kalskag (Qalqaq), Lower Kalskag (Qalqaq), Kipnuk (Qipnek), Kongiganak (Kangirnaq), Kwethluk (Kuiggluk), Kwigillingok (Kuigilnguq), Napakiak (Naparyarraq), Napaskiak (Napaskiaq), Nunapitchuk or Akolmiut (Nunapicuar), Oscarville (Kuiggayagaq), Platinum (Arviiq), Quinhagak (Kuinerraq), Tuluksak (Tuulkessaaq), and Tuntutuliak (Tuntutuliaq)
      2. Bristol Bay sub-dialect; spoken in Aleknagik (Alaqnaqiq), Clark's Point (Saguyaq), Dillingham (Curyung), Ekuk, Manokotak (Manuquutaq), Togiak (Tuyuryaq), and Twin Hills (Ingricuar)
    2. Peripheral dialects; spoken on the upper Kuskokwim, on the Yukon, and around Lake Iliamna
      1. Yukon or Lower Yukon sub-dialect; spoken in Alakanuk (Alarneq), Emmonak (Imangaq), Holy Cross (Ingirraller), Marshall or Fortuna Ledge (Masserculleq), Mountain Village (Asaacaryaraq), Nunam Iqua or Sheldon Point (Nunam Iqua), Pilot Station (Tuutalgaq), Pitkas Point (Negeqliim Painga), Russian Mission (Iqugmiut), St. Mary's (Negeqliq), Scammon Bay (Marayaarmiut)
      2. Upper or Middle Kuskokwim sub-dialect; spoken in Aniak (Anyaraq), Chuathbaluk (Curarpalek), Crooked Creek (Qipcarpak), McGrath, Sleetmute (Cellitemiut), Stony River
      3. Lake Iliamna sub-dialect; spoken in Egegik (Igyagiiq), Igiugig (Igyaraq), Iliamna (Illiamna), Kokhanok (Qarrʼunaq), Levelock (Liivlek), Naknek (Nakniq), South Naknek (Qinuyang)
    3. Mixed dialects (i.e., those that share features of core and peripheral varieties)
      1. Nelson Island & Stebbins sub-dialect; spoken in Chefornak (Cevvʼarneq), Newtok (Niugtaq), Nightmute (Negtemiut), Stebbins (Tapraq), Toksook Bay (Nunakauyaq or Qaluuyarmiut), Tununak (Tununeq)
      2. Nushagak River sub-dialect; spoken in Ekwok (Iquaq), Koliganek (Qalirneq), New Stuyahok (Cetuyaraq), Portage Creek
  - Egegik (extinct), once spoken in Egegik (Igyagiiq)
  - Hooper Bay-Chevak
    1. Hooper Bay sub-dialect; spoken in Hooper Bay (Naparyaarmiut)
    2. Chevak sub-dialect; spoken in Chevak (Cevʼaq),
  - Nunivak; spoken in Mekoryuk (Mikuryar).

The last of these, the Nunivak dialect (Cupʼig) is distinct and highly divergent from mainland Yupʼik dialects. The only significant difference between Hooper Bay and Chevak dialects is the pronunciation of the initial y- [j] as c- [tʃ] in Chevak in some words: Yupʼik in Hooper Bay but Cupʼik in Chevak.

Even sub-dialects may differ with regard to pronunciation and lexicon. The following table compares some words in two sub-dialects of General Central Yupʼik (Yugtun).

Yukon (Kuigpak)	Kuskokwim (Kusquqvak)	meaning
elicar-	elitnaur-	to study (intrans.); to teach someone (trans.)
elicaraq	elitnauraq	student
elicari-	elitnauri	to teach (intrans.)
elicarista	elitnaurista	teacher
aiggaq	unan	hand
ikusek	cingun	elbow
ayuqe-	kenir-	to cook by boiling
cella	ella	weather, outside, universe, awareness
naniq	kenurraq	lamp, light
uigtua-	naspaa-	to sample or taste, attempt, try

== Writing and literature ==
A syllabary known as the Yugtun script was invented for the language by Uyaquq, a native speaker, in about 1900, although the language is now mostly written using the Latin script. Early linguistic work in Central Yupʼik was done primarily by Russian Orthodox, then Jesuit and Moravian Church missionaries, leading to a modest tradition of literacy used in letter writing. In the 1960s, Irene Reed and others at the Alaska Native Language Center developed a modern writing system for the language. Their work led to the establishment of the state's first bilingual school programs in four Yupʼik villages in the early 1970s. Since then a wide variety of bilingual materials has been published, including Steven Jacobson's comprehensive dictionary of the language, his complete practical classroom grammar, and story collections and narratives by many others including a full novel by Anna Jacobson.

== Orthography ==
While several different systems have been used to write Yupʼik, the most widely used orthography today is that adopted by the Alaska Native Language Center and exemplified in Jacobson's (1984) dictionary, Jacobson's (1995) learner's grammar, and Miyaoka's (2012) grammar. The orthography is a Latin-script alphabet; the letters and digraphs used in alphabetical order are listed below, along with an indication of their associated phonemes in the International Phonetic Alphabet (IPA).

Letter / digraph	IPA	Letter / digraph	IPA	Notes
a	/a/	p	/p/	
c	/tʃ/	q	/q/	
e	/ə/	r	/ʁ/	represents /χ/ word-finally
g	/ɣ/	rr	/χ/	
gg	/x/	s	/z/	represents /s/ word-initially
i	/i/	ss	/s/	
k	/k/	t	/t/	
l	/l/	u	/u/	
ll	/ɬ/	u͡g	/ɣʷ/	
m	/m/	u͡r	/ʁʷ/	
ḿ	/m̥/	u͡rr	[χʷ]	does not contrast with /ʁʷ/
n	/n/	v	/v/	
ń	/n̥/	vv	/f/	
ng	/ŋ/	w	/xʷ/	
ńg	/ŋ̊/	y	/j/	

The vowel qualities /a, i, u/ may occur long; these are written aa, ii, uu when vowel length is not a result of stress. Consonants may also occur long (geminate), but their occurrence is often predictable by regular phonological rules, and so in these cases is not marked in the orthography. Where long consonants occur unpredictably they are indicated with an apostrophe following consonant. For example, Yupiaq and Yupʼik both contain a geminate p (/pː/). In Yupiaq length is predictable and hence is not marked; in Yupʼik the length is not predictable and so must be indicated with the apostrophe. An apostrophe is also used to separate n from g, to distinguish n'g /nɣ/ from the digraph ng /ŋ/. Apostrophes are also used between two consonants to indicate that voicing assimilation has not occurred (see below), and between two vowels to indicate the lack of gemination of a preceding consonant. A hyphen is used to separate a clitic from its host.

== Phonology ==
=== Vowels ===
Yup'ik contrasts four vowel qualities: /a i u ə/. The reduced vowel /ə/ always manifests phonetically short in duration, but the other three vowel qualities may occur phonetically short or long: [a aː i iː u uː]. Phonetically long vowels come about when a full vowel (/a i u/) is lengthened by stress (see below), or when two single vowels are brought together across a morpheme boundary. The effect is that while phonetic vowel length may yield a surface contrast between words, phonetic length is predictable and thus not phonemically contrastive.

Yup'ik vowel phonemes
	Front (unrounded)	Central (unrounded)	Back rounded
Non-low	i	ə	u
Low		a	

The vowel qualities [e o] are allophones of /i u/, and are found preceding uvular consonants (such as [q] or [ʁ]) and preceding the low vowel [a].

=== Consonants ===
Yup'ik does not contrast voicing in stops, but has a wide range of fricatives that contrast in voicing. The phoneme /l/ is not phonetically a fricative, but behaves as one phonologically in Yup'ik (in particular with regard to voicing alternations, where it alternates with [ɬ]; see below). Contrasts between /s/ and /z/ and between /f/ and /v/ are rare, and the greater part of the voicing contrasts among fricatives is between the laterals /l/ and /ɬ/, the velars /x/ and /ɣ/, and the uvulars /χ/ and /ʁ/. For some speakers, there is also a voicing contrast among the nasal consonants, which is typologically somewhat rare. Any consonant may occur as a geminate word-medially, and consonant length is contrastive.

Yup'ik consonants
		Labial	Alveolar	Postalv./ Palatal	Velar		Uvular	
		Labial	Alveolar	Postalv./ Palatal	plain	labialised	plain	labialised
Nasal	voiceless	m̥	n̥		ŋ̊			
Nasal	voiced	m	n		ŋ			
Stop		p	t		k		q	
Affricate			(t͡s)	t͡ʃ				
Fricative	voiceless	f	s		x	xʷ	χ	(χʷ)
Fricative	voiced	v	z		ɣ	ɣʷ	ʁ	ʁʷ
Fricative	lateral		ɬ					
Approximant			l	j		(w)		

The table above includes the allophones [χʷ], [ts], and [w]. The voiceless labialized uvular fricative [χʷ] occurs only in some speech variants and does not contrast with its voiced counterpart /ʁʷ/. The voiceless alveolar affricate [ts] is an allophone of /tʃ/ before the schwa vowel. The voiced labiovelar approximant [w] is an allophone of /v/ that typically occurs between two full vowels, excepting when it occurs adjacent to an inflectional suffix. For example, /tʃali-vig-∅/ "work-place-ABS" is pronounced [tʃaliːwik] (orthographically, calivik), since /v/ occurs between two full vowels and it not adjacent to the inflectional suffix. With /tʃav-utə/ "oar" by contrast, since /-utə/ is an inflectional suffix, /v/ does not undergo the allophonic alternation: [tʃavun] (cavun).

==== Dialect variations ====
In Norton Sound, as well as some villages on the lower Yukon, /j/ tends to be pronounced as [z] when following a consonant, and geminate /jː/ as [zː]. For example, the word angyaq "boat" of General Central Yup'ik (GCY) is angsaq [aŋzaq] Norton Sound.

Conversely, in the Hooper Bay-Chevak (HBC) dialect, there is no /z/ phoneme, and /j/ is used in its place, such that GCY qasgiq [qazɣeq] is pronounced qaygiq [qajɣeq]. HBC does not have the [w] allophone of /v/, such that /v/ is pronounced [v] in all contexts, and there are no labialized uvular fricatives.

In the Nunivak dialect, one finds /aː/ in place of GCY /ai/, such that GCY cukaitut "they are slow" is pronounced cukaatut, there is no word-final fortition of /x/ and /χ/ (see below), and word-initial /xʷ/ is pronounced [kʷ].

==== Voicing alternations ====
There are a variety of voicing assimilation processes (specifically, devoicing) that apply mostly predictably to continuant consonants (fricatives and nasals); these processes are not represented in the orthography.

- The voiced fricatives /v, z, l, ɣ, ʁ/ undergo voicing assimilation when adjacent to the voiceless stops /p, t, k, q/; this occurs progressively (left-to-right) and regressively (right-to-left). Thus ekvik is pronounced [əkfik], and qilugtuq /qiluɣ-tu-q/ is pronounced [qiluxtoq] (compare qilugaa /qiluɣ-a-a/ [qiluːɣaː]).
- Progressive voicing assimilation occurs from fricatives to fricatives: inarrvik /inaχ-vik/ is pronounced [inaχfik].
- Progressive voicing assimilation occurs from stops to nasals: ciut-ngu-uq "it is an ear" is pronounced [tʃiutŋ̊uːq].
- Progressive voicing optionally occurs from voiceless fricatives to nasals: errneq is pronounced [əχn̥əq] or [əχnəq].

Occasionally these assimilation processes do not apply, and in the orthography an apostrophe is written in the middle of the consonant cluster to indicate this: at'nguq is pronounced [atŋoq], not [atŋ̊oq].

Fricatives are devoiced word-initially and word-finally.

==== Word-final fortition ====
Another common phonological alternation of Yup'ik is word-final fortition. Among consonants, only the stops /t k q/, the nasals /m n ŋ/, and the fricative /χ/ may occur word-finally. Any other fricative (and in many cases also /χ/) will become a plosive when it occurs at the end of a word. For example, qayar-pak "big kayak" is pronounced [qajaχpak], while "kayak" alone is [qajaq]; the velar fricative becomes a stop word-finally. Moreover, the [k] of -pak is only a stop by virtue of it being word-final: if another suffix is added, as in qayar-pag-tun "like a big kayak" a fricative is found in place of that stop: [qajaχpaxtun].

==== Elision ====
The voiced velar consonants /ɣ ŋ/ are elided between single vowels, if the first is a full vowel: /tuma-ŋi/ is pronounced tumai [tumːai] (with geminate [mː] resulting from automatic gemination; see below).

=== Prosody ===
Yup'ik has an iambic stress system. Starting from the leftmost syllable in a word and moving rightward, syllables usually are grouped into units (termed "feet") containing two syllables each, and the second syllable of each foot is stressed. (However, feet in Yup'ik may also consist of a single syllable, which is almost always closed and must bear stress.) For example, in the word pissuqatalliniluni "apparently about to hunt", every second syllable (save the last) is stressed. The most prominent of these (i.e., the syllable that has primary stress) is the rightmost of the stressed syllables.

The iambic stress system of Yup'ik results in predicable iambic lengthening, a processes that serves to increase the weight of the prominent syllable in a foot. When lengthening cannot apply, a variety of processes involving either elision or gemination apply to create a well-formed prosodic word.

==== Iambic lengthening ====
Iambic lengthening is the process by which the second syllable in an iambic foot is made more prominent by lengthening the duration of the vowel in that syllable. In Yup'ik, a bisyllabic foot whose syllables each contain one phonologically single vowel will be pronounced with a long vowel in the second syllable. Thus pissuqatalliniluni /pisuqataɬiniluni/ "apparently about to hunt" is pronounced [(pi.'suː)(qa.'taː)(ɬi.'niː)lu.ni]. Following standard linguistic convention, parentheses here demarcate feet, periods represent the remaining syllable boundaries, and apostrophes occur before syllables that bear stress. In this word the second, fourth, and sixth syllables are pronounced with long vowels as a result of iambic lengthening. Iambic lengthening does not apply to final syllables in a word.

Because the vowel /ə/ cannot occur long in Yup'ik, when a syllable whose nucleus is /ə/ is in line to receive stress, iambic lengthening cannot apply. Instead, one of two things may happen. In Norton Sound dialects, the consonant following /ə/ will geminate if that consonant is not part of a cluster. This also occurs outside of Norton Sound if the consonants before and after /ə/ are phonetically similar. For example, /tuməmi/ "on the footprint" is not pronounced *[(tu.'məː)mi], which would be expected by iambic lengthening, but rather is pronounced [(tu.'məm)mi], with gemination of the second /m/ to increase the weight of the second syllable.

==== Regressive stress ====
There are a variety of prosodic factors that cause stress to retract (move backward) to a syllable where it would not otherwise be expected, given the usual iambic stress pattern. (These processes do not apply, however, in the Norton Sound dialects.) The processes by which stress retracts under prosodically-conditioned factors are said to feature regression of stress in Miyaoka's (2012) grammar. When regression occurs, the syllable to which stress regresses constitutes a monosyllabic foot.

The first of these processes is related to the inability of /ə/ to occur long. Outside of Norton Sound, if the consonants before and after /ə/ are phonetically dissimilar, /ə/ will elide, and stress will retract to a syllable whose nucleus is the vowel before the elided /ə/. For example, /nəqə-ni/ "his own fish" is not pronounced *[(nə.'qəː)ni], which would be expected by iambic lengthening, but rather is pronounced neq'ni [('nəq)ni], which features the elision of /ə/ and a monosyllabic foot.

Second, if the first syllable of a word is closed (ends in a consonant), this syllable constitutes a monosyllabic foot and receives stress. Iambic footing continues left-to-right from the right edge of that foot. For example, nerciqsugnarquq "(s)he probably will eat" has the stress pattern [('nəχ)(tʃiq.'sux)naχ.qoq], with stress on the first and third syllables.

Another third prosodic factor that influences regressive is hiatus: the occurrence of adjacent vowels. Yup'ik disallows hiatus at the boundaries between feet: any two consecutive vowels must be grouped within the same foot. If two vowels are adjacent, and the first of these would be at the right edge of a foot (and thus stressed) given the usual iambic footing, the stress retracts to a preceding syllable. Without regressive accent, Yupiaq /jupiaq/ would be pronounced *[(ju.'piː)aq], but because of the ban on hiatus at foot boundaries, stress retracts to the initial syllable, and consonant gemination occurs to increase the weight of that initial syllable, resulting in [('jup)pi.aq]. This process is termed automatic gemination in Jacobson's (1995) grammar.

Yup'ik also disallows iambic feet that consist of a closed syllable followed by an open one, i.e. feet of the form CVC.'CV(ː), where C and V stand for "consonant" and "vowel" respectively. To avoid this type of foot, stress retracts: cangatenrituten /tʃaŋatənʁitutən/ has the stress pattern [(tʃa.'ŋaː)('tən)(ʁi.'tuː)tən] to avoid the iambic foot *(tən.'ʁiː) that would otherwise be expected.

== Grammar ==
Yup'ik has highly synthetic morphology: the number of morphemes within a word is very high. The language is moreover agglutinative, meaning that affixation is the primary strategy for word formation, and that an affix, when added to a word, does not unpredictably affect the forms of neighboring affixes. Because of the tendency to create very long verbs through suffixation, a Yupʼik verb often carries as much information as an English sentence, and word order is often quite free.

Three parts of speech are identified: nouns, verbs, and particles. Because there are fewer parts of speech than in (e.g.) English, each category has a wider range of uses. For example, Yup'ik grammatical case fulfills the role that English prepositions do, and nominal derivational affixes or roots fulfill the role that English adjectives do.

=== Morphology ===
In descriptive work on Yup'ik, there are four regions within nouns and verbs that are commonly identified. The first of these is often called the stem (equivalent to the notion of a root), which carries the core meaning of the word. Following the stem come zero or more postbases, which are derivational modifiers that change the category of the word or augment its meaning. (Yup'ik does not have adjectives; nominal roots and postbases are used instead.) The third section is called an ending, which carries the inflectional categories of case (on nouns), grammatical mood (on verbs), person, and number. Finally, optional enclitics may be added, which usually indicate "the speaker's attitude towards what he is saying such as questioning, hoping, reporting, etc." Orthographically, enclitics are separated from the rest of the word with a hyphen. However, since hyphens are already used in glosses to separate morphemes, there is potential for confusion as to whether a morpheme is a suffix or an enclitic, so in glosses the equals sign is used instead.

Example verb: angyarpaliyukapigtellruunga
Stem	Postbases	Ending	Enclitic
angyar boat	-pa -li -yu -kapigte -llru AUG make DES INT PST	-u -nga IND 1SG	
"I wished very much to build a big boat"

Example verb: assirtua-gguq
Stem	Postbases	Ending	Enclitic
assir good		-tu -a IND 1SG	=gguq RPR
"(he says) I'm fine"
"(tell him) I'm fine"

Example noun: kipusvik
Stem	Postbases	Ending	Enclitic
kipus buy	-vik LOC	-Ø; ABS.SG	
"store" (lit. "place for buying")

Example noun: qayarpaliyaraqa
Stem	Postbases	Ending	Enclitic
qayar kayak	-pa -li -yara AUG make NMLZ	-q -a ABS.SG 1SG	
"the way I make a big kayak"

Because post-bases are derivational morphemes, and thus can change the part of speech of a word, many verbs are built from noun stems, and vice versa. For example, neqe-ngqer-tua "I have fish" is a verb, despite the fact that neqe- "fish" is a noun; the postbase -ngqerr "have" makes the resulting word a verb. These changes in grammatical category can apply iteratively, such that over the course of word formation, a word may become a noun, then a verb, then back to a noun, and so on.

=== Verb conjugation ===
The conjugation of Yup'ik verbs involves obligatory marking of grammatical mood and agreement.

==== Grammatical mood ====
Yup'ik has a great number of grammatical moods. The moods can be categorized according to whether the clause in which they are found is independent or subordinate. There are four so-called independent moods: the indicative, optative, interrogative, and participial; these typically are found on the main verbs of independent clauses. Yupʼik also has ten connective moods, which occur on the verbs of adverbial clauses; the connective moods are the Yup'ik equivalent of many subordinating conjunctions of English, and are often translated as 'because', 'although', 'if' and 'while'. The form of a given mood may depend on the transitivity of the verb (e.g., the intransitive form of the participial mood suffix is usually -lriar, but when this mood is suffixed to a transitive verb, its form is -ke instead), on the person of the grammatical subject (e.g., the optative mood is marked with -li only if the subject is third person), or on the phonological or morphological environment.

Yup'ik grammatical moods
		Forms	Common uses (not exhaustive)
Independent moods	Indicative	-gur (intransitive) -gar (transitive)	Used to form declarative sentences
Independent moods	Participial	-lriar, or -ngur after /t/ (intransitive) -ke (transitive)	(Varied)
Independent moods	Interrogative	-ta (after a consonant, if subject is third person) -ga (after a vowel, if subject is third person) -ci (if subject is first or second person)	Used to form wh-questions
Independent moods	Optative	-li (if subject is third person) -la (if subject is first person) -gi or -na (if subject is second person)	Used to express wishes, requests, suggestions, commands, and occasionally to make declarative statements
Co-subordinate	Appositional	-lu, or -na after certain suffixes	Used for cosubordination, coordination, and in independent clauses
Connective moods	Causal	-nga	Used to form subordinate clauses (translated "because, when")
Connective moods	Constative	-gaq(a)	Used to form subordinate clauses (translated "whenever")
Connective moods	Precessive	-pailg	Used to form subordinate clauses (translated "before")
Connective moods	Concessive	-ngrrarr	Used to form subordinate clauses (translated "although, even if")
Connective moods	Conditional	-k(u)	Used to form subordinate clauses (translated "if")
Connective moods	Indirective	-cu(a)	Used to express indirect suggestions, admonishment
Connective moods	Contemporative	-llr	Used to form subordinate clauses (translated "when")
Connective moods	Simultaneous	-nginanrr	Used to form subordinate clauses (translated "while")
Connective moods	Stative	-Ø	Used to form subordinate clauses (translated "being in the state of")

In addition to the connective moods listed above, there are five so-called "quasi-connective" moods. Though these are adverbial adjuncts to main clauses and thus are similar in function to the connective moods, they inflect like nominals (they inflect with case, not agreement).

==== Agreement ====
Yup'ik has a rich system of agreement on verbs. Up to two nominal arguments may be cross-referenced (intransitive verbs agree with their sole argument, and transitive verbs agree with both arguments). Three numbers (singular, dual, and plural) are distinguished, as well as at least three persons (first, second, and third). The third person is unmarked when cross-referencing subjects, and the verbs of dependent clauses may have two types of third person forms depending on whether some argument is co-refers with the subject of the verb in the independent clause (see "Co-reference across clauses" below). To the extent that subject and object agreement markers are not fusional, subject agreement linearly precedes object agreement.

Depending on the grammatical mood of the verb and which grammatical persons are being cross-referenced, agreement may display either an ergative pattern (where the sole argument of an intransitive verb is cross-referenced with the same morpheme that it would be if it were the object of a transitive verb) or an accusative pattern (where the sole argument of an intransitive verb is cross-referenced with the same morpheme that it would be if it were the subject of a transitive verb).

Agreement markers vary in form depending on the grammatical mood of the verb. The two examples below illustrate this. In (1), the 1SG>3SG agreement marker is -qa because the verb is in the indicative mood, while in (2) the agreement marker is -ku due to verb being in the optative mood.

assik-a-qa
like-IND.TR-1SG>3SG
"I like him/her/it"

patu-la-ku=tuq egaleq
close-OPT-1SG>3SG=wish window.ABS
"I hope I will close the window"

The participial and indicative share a set of agreement markers, and all the connective moods likewise share a common set (which is shared also with some possessed nouns).

==== Co-reference across clauses ====
The form of 3rd-person agreement in dependent clauses may vary depending on whether that 3rd-person argument is the same referent as, or a different referent than, a 3rd-person subject of the independent clause. In some descriptive work on the language, when the subject of the independent clause is co-referential with the relevant argument in the dependent clause, the agreement in the dependent clause is said to reflect a "fourth" or a "reflexive third" person. Jacobson (1995) uses the following contrast to illustrate:

Nere-llru-uq ermig-pailg-an
eat-PST-IND.3SG wash.face-before-3SG
"She ate before she (another) washed her face."

Nere-llru-uq ermig-paileg-mi
eat-PST-IND.3SG wash.face-before-4SG
"She ate before she (herself) washed her face."

The intransitive agreement in the dependent clause ermig-pailg-an in (3) is -an, indicating that the argument of the dependent clause is a different referent than the subject of the independent clause nerellruuq, while in (4) the agreement -mi indicates that the arguments of each clause are co-referential. Some grammatical moods do not have associated agreement markers that contrast these two types of third person.

Some researchers have argued that the contrast in (3-4) exemplifies a type of switch-reference, though McKenzie (2015) claims Yup'ik does not have the true characteristics of switch-reference, and that the Yup'ik system is better understood in terms of obviation or long-distance anaphora.

=== Nouns ===
Yup'ik nouns inflect for number, case, and show agreement with the person and number of a possessor if present.

==== Grammatical case ====
The morphosyntactic alignment of Yupʼik is ergative-absolutive, meaning that subjects of intransitive verbs bear the same grammatical case (the absolutive) as the objects of transitive verbs, while the subjects of transitive verbs have a different case (the ergative). For example, the sentence Angyaq tak'uq ("The boat is long") features an intransitive verb, and the subject (angyaq, "the boat") is in the absolutive case. By comparison, in the sentence Angyaq kiputaa ("He buys the boat"), the verb is transitive, and it is now the object (angyaq, "the boat") that bears the absolutive. This contrasts with nominative-accusative languages like English, where the subjects of intransitives and transitives are identical in form ("He slept", "He ate the bread"), while the objects of transitives have a different case ("The moose saw him").

In addition to the absolutive and ergative structural cases (the latter of which is syncretic with the genitive; collectively the ergative and genitive are usually called the relative case), there are at least five other cases that are mostly-nonstructural: ablative-modalis (a historical syncretism of ablative and instrumental cases), allative, locative, perlative, and equalis.

Yup'ik grammatical cases
			Common function(s)	English equivalents
Structural	Absolutive		Identifies the sole argument of an intransitive verb Identifies the definite object of a transitive verb	(none)
Structural	Relative	Ergative	Identifies the subject of a transitive verb	(none)
Structural	Relative	Genitive	Identifies a possessor	's (as in John's book)
Non-structural	Ablative-modalis		Identifies a spatial or temporal starting point Marks nominals demoted from absolutive case under valency reduction	from (none)
Non-structural	Allative		Identifies a spatial or temporal end point Marks nominals demoted from relative case under valency reduction	to (none)
Non-structural	Locative		Identifies spatial or temporal locations Indicates the standard of comparison in comparatives	at, in, during than
Non-structural	Perlative		Identifies a spatial or temporal route through which movement occurs	along, via, by way of
Non-structural	Equalis		Marks a nominal that is similar/equivalent to another; commonly co-occurs with the verb ayuqe- "resemble"	(none)

The forms of these grammatical cases are variable, depending on the grammatical person and number of the head noun as well as the person and number of its possessor (if there is one).

==== Possession ====
Possessed nouns, like all other nouns, inflect for number and case, but also show person and number agreement with their possessor. For example, consider a few forms of saskaq "cup". The two leftmost nouns below are unpossessed, but the third is marked for a first person singular possessor -ka (pronounced in this case as -qa after assimilating to a uvular place of articulation). The final example marks plural number for both the noun itself and its possessor.

saskaq saskat saskaqa saskaa saskait
saskar-∅ saskar-t saskar-∅-ka saskar-nga-∅ saskar-ngi-t
cup-ABS.SG cup-ABS.PL cup-ABS.SG-1SG cup-ABS.SG-3SG cup-ABS.PL-3PL
"cup" "cups" {"my cup"} {"his/her cup"} {"their cups"}

Possessors are often optional, but when present are marked with relative case:

angute-m kuuvviar-a
man-REL.SG coffee.ABS.SG-3SG
"the man's coffee"

=== Word order ===
Yup'ik has considerably more freedom of word order than English does. In English, the word order of subjects and objects with respect to a verb reflects the thematic roles of the subject and object. For example, the English sentence The dog bit the preacher means something different than The preacher bit the dog does; this is because in English, the noun that comes before the verb must be the agent (the biter), while the noun following the verb must be the theme (the individual or thing that is bitten).

In Yupʼik, word order is freer because the rich inflectional system often serves to unambiguously identify thematic relations without recourse to word order. These Yup'ik sentences both mean "the dog bit the preacher", for instance.

Qimugtem keggellrua agayulirta
dog.ERG bit preacher.ABS

Agayulirta keggellrua qimugtem
preacher.ABS bit dog.ERG

The word order varies between these sentences, but the fact that qimugtem ("dog") is marked with ergative case (-m) is sufficient to identify it as the thematic agent. Thus, to say "the preacher bit the dog" in Yup'ik, one would need change which noun gets ergative case and which gets absolutive:

qimugta keggellrua agayulirtem
dog.ABS bit preacher.ERG
"the preacher bit the dog"

Despite the greater freedom of word order, there seems to be a general preference for Subject-Object-Verb (SOV) order (though VSO is also common, and pragmatic factors also play a significant role). This can be observed in circumstances where the inflectional system will not unambiguously determine which noun is the agent and which is the theme. This obtains, for instance, when both arguments of an indicative transitive verb are third person plural and unpossessed: elitnauristet mikelnguut assikait can, in principle, mean either "the teachers like the children" or "the children like the teachers", since the case marking on elitnauristet "teachers" and mikelnguut "children" does not distinguish ergative from absolutive case (-t marks unpossessed ergative plurals as well as unpossessed absolutive plurals). In cases like this, the SOV preference comes into play, and the sentence is most readily interpreted as "the teachers like the children".

=== Spatial deixis ===
Yup'ik has a rich system of spatial deixis. That is, many of the spatial properties of things and events are linguistically encoded in great detail; this holds true for demonstrative pronouns (like English "this one", "that one") as well as spatial adverbs ("here", "there").

There are twelve categories that define the orientation of a thing or event with respect to the environment. The environment in this sense includes topographical features (e.g., there is a contrast between upriver and downriver), the participants in the speech event (e.g., there is a contrast between proximity to the speaker and proximity to the hearer), and the linguistic context (one of these twelve categories is used for anaphora). This twelve-way contrast is cross-cut by a trinomial contrast in horizontal extension/motion: this determines whether the referent is extended (horizontally long or moving) or non-extended, and if non-extended, whether distal (typically far away, indistinct, and invisible) or proximal (typically nearby, distinct, and visible).

To illustrate, the spatial demonstrative roots of Yup'ik (which are then inflected for case and number) are presented in the following table from Miyaoka (2012).

Class	Translation of class	Extended	Non-extended	
Class	Translation of class	Extended	Distal	Proximal
I	here (near speaker)	mat-		u-
II	there (near hearer)	tamat-		tau-
III	aforementioned / known		im-	
IV	approaching (in space or time)		uk-	
V	over there	au͡g-	am-	ing-
VI	across there, on the opposite bank	ag-	akm-	ik-
VII	back/up there, away from river	pau͡g-	pam-	ping-
VIII	up/above there (vertically)	pag-	pakm-	pik-
IX	down/below there, toward river (bank)	un-	cam-	kan-
X	out there, toward exit, downriver	un'g-	cakm-	ug-
XI	inside, upriver, inland	qau͡g-	qam-	kiug-/kiu͡g-
XII	outside, north	qag-	qakm-	kex-

Note that Classes I and II lack distal forms due to an inherently non-distal meaning (these forms only locate things that are near to the speaker/hearer). Class III is purely anaphoric, and thus only has a distal form.

== Yupʼik language education ==
Small changes have been made towards teaching Yupʼik to the native Alaskan Yupʼiks. In 1972, the Alaska State Legislature passed legislation mandating that if "a [school is attended] by at least 15 pupils whose primary language is other than English, [then the school] shall have at least one teacher who is fluent in the native language". Then, during the mid-1970s, educational programs emerged in order to revive and sustain the Yupʼik language: MacLean notes that "In 1975, an Alaska State statute was enacted directing all school boards to '...provide a bilingual-bicultural education program for each school...which is attended by at least 8 pupils of limited English-speaking ability and whose primary language is other than English'". However, "the statute addressed all languages other than English, and thus expanded bilingualism equally to immigrant languages," meaning that although the statute welcomed non-English languages into schools, its primary "aim" was to "promote English proficiency", not to keep Yupʼik alive.

Later, during the 1987-8 school year, three organizations, including members of the Alaska Native community, "initiated a process to establish an Alaska Native Language Policy for schools in Alaska," which "states that schools have a responsibility to teach and use as the medium of instruction the Alaska Native language of the local community to the extent desired by the parents of that community". This proposal for the Alaska Native Language Policy comes three years after Steven A. Jacobson's Central Yupʼik and the Schools: A Handbook for Teachers, a guide for teachers which exemplifies differences and similarities between English and Yupʼik so that Yupʼik or English-speaking teachers might successfully engage English-speaking Eskimo Yupʼik students in a "bilingual-bicultural education" that teaches their native language.

In 2018, Anchorage's first Yup'ik immersion program was launched at College Gate Elementary. Yup'ik language courses are offered at the University of Alaska Anchorage and the University of Alaska Fairbanks. The latter also offers Bachelor's degrees in Yupʼik Language and Culture, as well as associate degrees in Native Language Education with a concentration in Yupʼik, and certificates in Yupʼik Language Proficiency.

== See also ==
- Chevak Cupʼik language
- Nunivak Cupʼig language
- Alaska Native Language Center
- Lower Yukon School District (Yupʼik)
- Lower Kuskokwim School District (Yupʼik & Cupʼig)
- Yupiit School District (Yupʼik)
- Kashunamiut School District (Cupʼik)

== Bibliography ==
- Buckley, Eugene (1998). "Iambic Lengthening and Final Vowels". International Journal of American Linguistics. 64 (3): 179–223. doi:10.1086/466357. JSTOR 1265684. S2CID 145804018.
- Jacobson, Steven A. (1984). Central Yupʼik and the Schools: A Handbook for Teachers.
- Jacobson, Steven A. (1995). A Practical Grammar of the Central Alaskan Yupʼik Eskimo Language (PDF). Fairbanks: Alaska Native Language Center. ISBN 978-1-55500-050-9. OCLC 883251222.
- Jacobson, Steven A. (1990). "Comparison of Central Alaskan Yupik Eskimo and Central Siberian Yupik Eskimo". International Journal of American Linguistics. 56 (2). International Journal of American Linguistics: The University of Chicago Press: 264–286. doi:10.1086/466153. JSTOR 1265132. S2CID 144786120.
- Jewelgreen, Lydia (2008), Central Alaskan Yupik, archived from the original on May 26, 2019
- Krauss, Michael (1985). Yupic Eskimo prosodic systems : descriptive and comparative studies. ISBN 0-933769-37-7. OCLC 260177704.
- MacLean, Edna Ahgeak (2004), Culture and Change for Iñupiat and Yupiks of Alaska (PDF), archived from the original (PDF) on 2012-03-07
- Mithun, Marianne; Ali, Elizabeth (1996). "The Elaboration of Aspectual Categories: Central Alaskan Yupik". Folia Linguistica. 30 (1–2). doi:10.1515/flin.1996.30.1-2.111.
- Mithun, Marianne (1999). The Languages of Native North America. Cambridge: Cambridge University Press. ISBN 978-0-521-29875-9.
- Reed, Irene; Miyaoka, Osahito; Jacobson, Steven A.; Afcan, Paschal; Krauss, Michael (1977), Yupʼik Eskimo Grammar, University of Alaska
- Woodbury, Anthony C. (1983). "Switch-reference, syntactic organization, and rhetorical structure in Central Yup'ik Eskimo". In John Haiman; Pamela Munro (eds.). Proceedings of a symposium on switch reference and universal grammar, Winnipeg, May 1981. Typological Studies in Language. Vol. 2. John Benjamins Publishing Company. p. 291. doi:10.1075/tsl.2.16woo. ISBN 978-90-272-2866-6.
- Miyaoka, Osahito (2012). A Grammar of Central Alaskan Yupik (CAY). De Gruyter Mouton. doi:10.1515/9783110278576. ISBN 978-3-11-027857-6.
