= Portage Creek, Alaska =

- Census-designated place
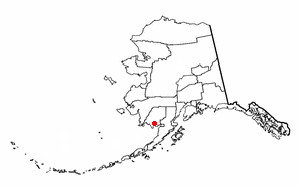
- Location of Portage Creek, Alaska
- Coordinates: 58°54′22″N 157°43′0″W
- Country: United States
- State: Alaska
- Census Area: Dillingham

Government
  - State senator: Lyman Hoffman (D)
  - State rep.: Bryce Edgmon (I)

Area
  - Total: 13.17 sq mi (34.11 km^{2})
  - Land: 13.17 sq mi (34.11 km^{2})
  - Water: 0 sq mi (0.00 km^{2})
- Elevation: 40 ft (12 m)

Population (2020)
  - Total: 4
  - Density: 0.31/sq mi (0.12/km^{2})
- Time zone: UTC-9 (Alaska (AKST))
  - Summer (DST): UTC-8 (AKDT)
- ZIP code: 99569
- Area code: 907
- FIPS code: 02-62285

Portage Creek is a census-designated place (CDP) in Dillingham Census Area, Alaska, United States. As of the 2020 census, Portage Creek had a population of 4.

== Geography ==
The Portage Creek CDP is located at 58°54′22″N 157°43′0″W (58.906088, -157.716758), at the confluence of Portage Creek with the Nushagak River.

According to the United States Census Bureau, the CDP has a total area of 12.9 square miles (33.3 km^{2}), all of it land.

== Demographics ==
Historical population
Census	Pop.	Note	%±
1980	48		—
1990	5		−89.6%
2000	36		620.0%
2010	2		−94.4%
2020	4		100.0%
U.S. Decennial Census

Portage Creek first appeared on the 1980 U.S. Census as a census-designated place (CDP). In 1990, it lost that designation and was reclassified as an unincorporated Alaskan Native Village Statistical Area (ANVSA). In 2000, it regained its status as a census-designated place (CDP).

As of the census of 2000, there were 36 people, 7 households, and 4 families residing in the CDP. The population density was 2.7 people per square mile (1.0 people/km^{2}). There were 22 housing units at an average density of 1.7 per square mile (0.66/km^{2}). The racial makeup of the CDP was 13.89% White and 86.11% Native American.

There were 7 households, out of which 57.1% had children under the age of 18 living with them, 71.4% were married couples living together, and 28.6% were non-families. 28.6% of all households were made up of individuals, and none had someone living alone who was 65 years of age or older. The average household size was 5.14 and the average family size was 6.60.

In the CDP, the population was spread out, with 52.8% under the age of 18, 11.1% from 18 to 24, 25.0% from 25 to 44, 5.6% from 45 to 64, and 5.6% who were 65 years of age or older. The median age was 14 years. For every 100 females, there were 111.8 males. For every 100 females age 18 and over, there were 88.9 males.

The median income for a household in the CDP was $41,250, and the median income for a family was $41,250. Males had a median income of $0 versus $16,250 for females. The per capita income for the CDP was $8,010. There were no families and none of the population living below the poverty line, including no under eighteens and none of those over 64.

As of November 2013 there were only 2 year-round residents of Portage Creek.

== Education ==
It was previously served by the Portage Creek School, operated by the Southwest Region School District.
