= Yugtun script =

Alaskan syllabary writing system

Yugtun
- Script type: Syllabary
- Creator: Uyaquq
- Period: 1900
- Direction: Left-to-right
- Languages: Central Alaskan Yup'ik

Unicode
- Unicode range: Not in Unicode

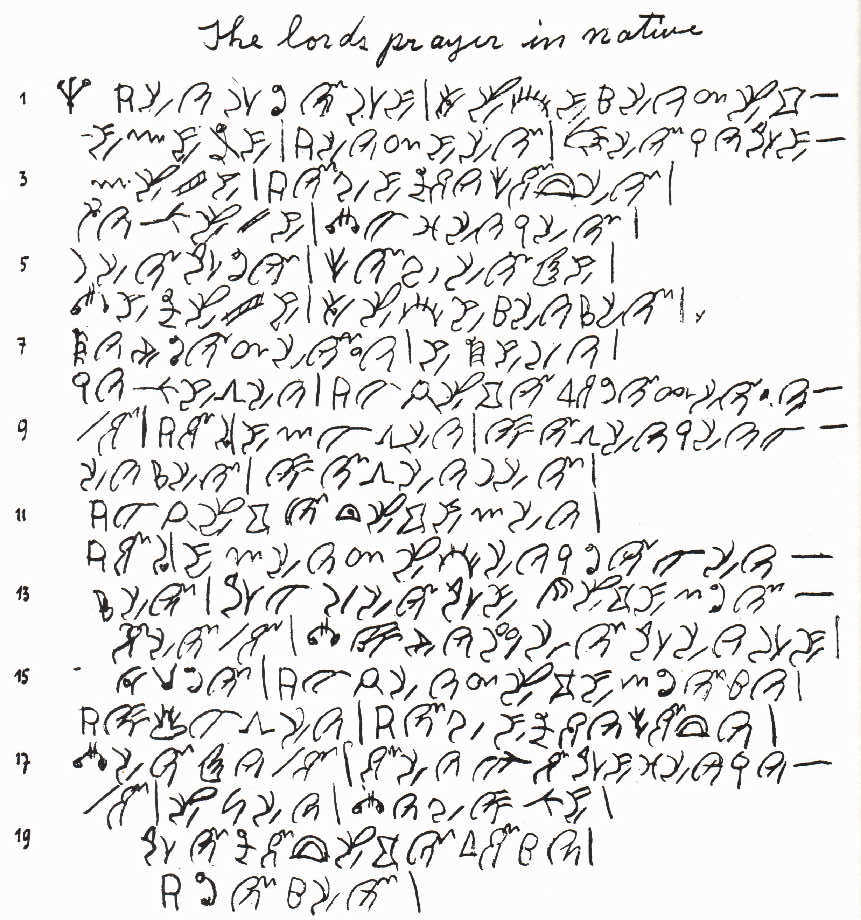
The Lord's Prayer in Yugtun script.

The Yugtun or Alaska script is a syllabary invented around the year 1900 by Uyaquq to write the Central Alaskan Yup'ik language. Uyaquq, who was monolingual in Yup'ik but had a son who was literate in English, initially used Indigenous pictograms as a form of proto-writing that served as a mnemonic in preaching the Bible. However, when he realized that this did not allow him to reproduce the exact words of a passage the way the Latin alphabet did for English-speaking missionaries, he and his assistants developed it until it became a full syllabary. Although Uyaquq never learned English or the Latin alphabet, he was influenced by both. The syllable kut, for example, resembles the cursive form of the English word good.

The Yup'ik language is now generally written in the Latin alphabet.

== Bibliography ==
- Albertine Gaur, 2000. Literacy and the Politics of Writing, ISBN 978-1841500119
- Alfred Schmitt, 1951. Die Alaska-Schrift und ihre schriftgeschichtliche Bedeutung, Simons, Marburg
- Alfred Schmitt, 1981. Untersuchungen zur Geschichte der Schrift. Eine Schriftentwicklung um 1900 in Alaska, Harrassowitz, Wiesbaden (Reprint der Ausgabe Leipzig 1940), ISBN 3-447-02162-4
  - Vol. 1 Text, vol. 2. Abbildungen
