= Togiak, Alaska =

Togiak Tuyuryaq
- City
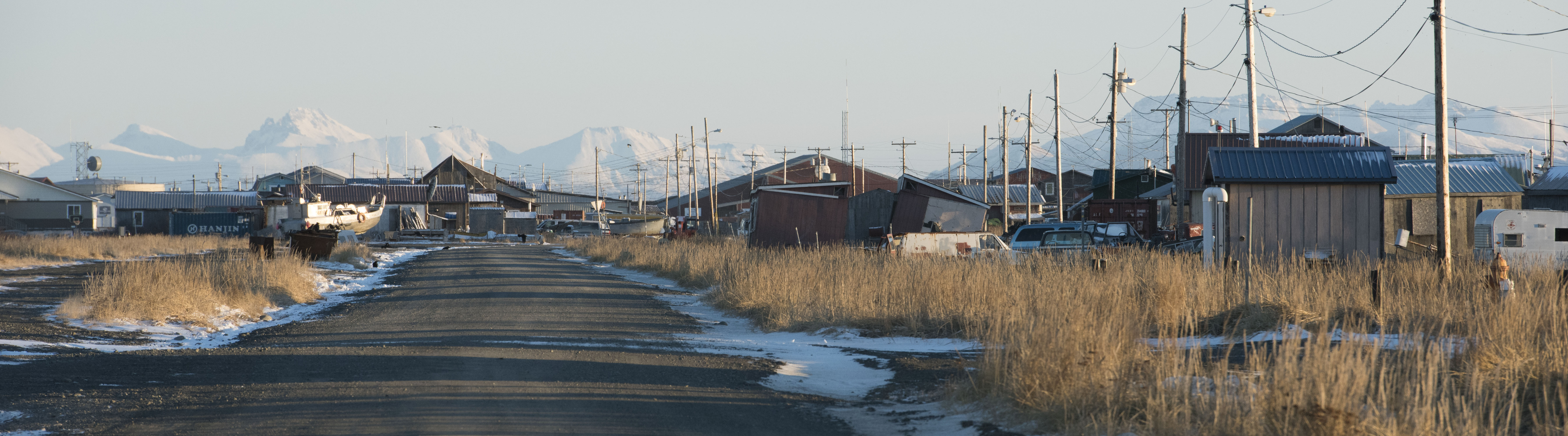

- Location in Alaska
- Coordinates: 59°3′33″N 160°22′59″W
- Country: United States
- State: Alaska
- Census Area: Dillingham
- Incorporated: June 23, 1969

Government
  - Mayor: Anna May Kasak
  - State senator: Lyman Hoffman (D)
  - State rep.: Bryce Edgmon (I)

Area
  - Total: 224.65 sq mi (581.84 km^{2})
  - Land: 42.01 sq mi (108.81 km^{2})
  - Water: 182.64 sq mi (473.03 km^{2})
- Elevation: 3.3 ft (1 m)

Population (2020)
  - Total: 817
  - Density: 19.5/sq mi (7.51/km^{2})
- Time zone: UTC-9 (Alaska (AKST))
  - Summer (DST): UTC-8 (AKDT)
- ZIP code: 99678
- Area code: 907
- FIPS code: 02-77690
- GNIS feature ID: 1411039

Togiak (Central Yupik: Tuyuryaq) is a city in Dillingham Census Area, Alaska, United States. As of the 2020 census, Togiak had a population of 817.

== History ==
Togiak is the successor village of two earlier Inuit villages, Togiagamute (Togiagamiut) & Togiak Station (also known as Togiak or Owens). The prior two villages were on the eastern side of Togiak Bay. By the early 20th century, heavy winter snowfalls made wood gathering difficult, so residents began to relocate to the west side of the bay to the new village of Togiak, which first appeared on the 1920 census. The earlier village of Togiagamute is now within the adjacent Twin Hills CDP, and the old site is still occupied. Togiak Station, about 7 miles south of the former Togiagamute, is now a ghost.

The Togiak area became a draw for natives in the vicinity after the devastating influenza pandemic of 1918–19, which had almost wiped out many villages. Togiak was flooded in 1964, which prompted some residents to relocate and establish the new community of Twin Hills, northeast of the original village of Togiagamute on the upper east side of the bay.

== Geography ==
Togiak is located at 59°3′33″N 160°22′59″W (59.059134, -160.383186), at the head of Togiak Bay, 67 miles (108 km) west of Dillingham. It lies in Togiak National Wildlife Refuge, and is the gateway to Walrus Island Game Sanctuary. Togiak is in a climatic transition zone; however, the Arctic climate also affects the region. Average summer temperatures range from 37 to 66 °F (3 to 19 °C); winter temperatures range from −45 to 30 °F (−43 to −1 °C).

According to the United States Census Bureau, the city has a total area of 226.3 square miles (586.0 km^{2}), of which 44.4 square miles (115.0 km^{2}) is land and 181.8 square miles (470.9 km^{2}), or 80.37%, is water.

== Demographics ==
Historical population
Census	Pop.	Note	%±
1920	91		—
1930	71		−22.0%
1940	10		−85.9%
1950	108		980.0%
1960	220		103.7%
1970	383		74.1%
1980	470		22.7%
1990	613		30.4%
2000	809		32.0%
2010	817		1.0%
2020	817		0.0%
U.S. Decennial Census

The present city of Togiak first appeared on the 1920 U.S. Census as an unincorporated village. The earlier settlements of Togiagamute (1880 pop. 276; 1890: 94) and Togiak Station (1880: 24; 1890: 14), were on the east side of the bay and not within present city limits. On the 1940 census, the area of "Togiak Bay" was reported separately, featuring 46 residents. These may or may not have been residents within or adjacent to Togiak, which would account for the drastic population drop from 1930's 71 to just 10 in 1940. "Togiak Bay" was not reported again. The village formally incorporated in 1969.

=== 2020 census ===
As of the 2020 census, Togiak had a population of 817. The median age was 27.3 years. 36.4% of residents were under the age of 18 and 10.0% of residents were 65 years of age or older. For every 100 females there were 95.9 males, and for every 100 females age 18 and over there were 103.1 males age 18 and over.

0.0% of residents lived in urban areas, while 100.0% lived in rural areas.

There were 229 households in Togiak, of which 51.5% had children under the age of 18 living in them. Of all households, 31.0% were married-couple households, 24.5% were households with a male householder and no spouse or partner present, and 31.4% were households with a female householder and no spouse or partner present. About 19.2% of all households were made up of individuals and 3.9% had someone living alone who was 65 years of age or older.

There were 275 housing units, of which 16.7% were vacant. The homeowner vacancy rate was 0.0% and the rental vacancy rate was 0.0%.

Racial composition as of the 2020 census
Race	Number	Percent
White	41	5.0%
Black or African American	0	0.0%
American Indian and Alaska Native	738	90.3%
Asian	1	0.1%
Native Hawaiian and Other Pacific Islander	0	0.0%
Some other race	1	0.1%
Two or more races	36	4.4%
Hispanic or Latino (of any race)	9	1.1%

=== 2000 census ===
As of the census of 2000, there were 809 people, 202 households, and 164 families residing in the city. The population density was 17.9 inhabitants per square mile (6.9/km^{2}). There were 221 housing units at an average density of 4.9 per square mile (1.9/km^{2}). The racial makeup of the city was 6.92% White, 0.12% Black or African American, 86.28% Native American, 0.25% from other races, and 6.43% from two or more races. 1.11% of the population were Hispanic or Latino of any race.

There were 202 households, out of which 56.4% had children under the age of 18 living with them, 56.4% were married couples living together, 16.8% had a female householder with no husband present, and 18.8% were non-families. 15.3% of all households were made up of individuals, and 2.5% had someone living alone who was 65 years of age or older. The average household size was 4.00 and the average family size was 4.50.

In the city, the age distribution of the population shows 42.8% under the age of 18, 9.0% from 18 to 24, 26.1% from 25 to 44, 15.1% from 45 to 64, and 7.0% who were 65 years of age or older. The median age was 23 years. For every 100 females, there were 101.2 males. For every 100 females age 18 and over, there were 111.4 males.

The median income for a household in the city was $23,977, and the median income for a family was $28,500. Males had a median income of $36,250 versus $34,063 for females. The per capita income for the city was $9,676. About 32.5% of families and 29.9% of the population were below the poverty line, including 31.9% of those under age 18 and 8.7% of those age 65 or over.

== Education ==
The Togiak School of the Southwest Region School District serves the village.
