= Ekwok, Alaska =

Ekwok, Alaska Iquaq
- City
- Location in Alaska
- Coordinates: 59°20′57″N 157°29′7″W
- Country: United States
- State: Alaska
- Census Area: Dillingham
- Incorporated: 1974

Government
  - Mayor: Luki Akelkok, Sr.
  - State senator: Lyman Hoffman (D)
  - State rep.: Bryce Edgmon (I)

Area
  - Total: 18.01 sq mi (46.64 km^{2})
  - Land: 16.75 sq mi (43.37 km^{2})
  - Water: 1.26 sq mi (3.27 km^{2})
- Elevation: 98 ft (30 m)

Population (2020)
  - Total: 111
  - Density: 6.6/sq mi (2.56/km^{2})
- Time zone: UTC-9 (Alaska (AKST))
  - Summer (DST): UTC-8 (AKDT)
- ZIP code: 99580
- Area code: 907
- FIPS code: 02-21810
- GNIS feature ID: 1401738

Ekwok (Central Yupik: Iquaq) is a city in Dillingham Census Area, Alaska, United States. At the 2020 census, the population was 111.

== History ==
Ekwok means "end of the bluff" (river's edge) in Yupik, from iquk ("end"). It is the oldest continuously occupied Yupik village on the Nushagak River. During the 1800s, the settlement was used in the spring and summer as a fish camp, and in the fall as a base camp for picking berries. By 1923, it was the largest settlement along the river.

From the early 1900s until 1941, mail was delivered by dog sled from Dillingham. In 1941 a post office opened in Ekwok. Before 1960, most of the buildings in Ekwok were located in a low area near the river. After a flood in the early 1960s, the village was relocated to its current location.

== Geography ==
Ekwok is located at 59°20′57″N 157°29′7″W (59.349260, -157.485404).

Ekwok is on the Nushagak River in southwestern Alaska, 43 miles (69 km) northeast of Dillingham.

According to the United States Census Bureau, Ekwok has a total area of 17.5 square miles (45.4 km^{2}), of which 16.3 square miles (42.1 km^{2}) is land and 1.2 square miles (3.2 km^{2}), or 7.10%, is water.

== Demographics ==
Historical population
| Census | Pop. | Note | %± |
|---|---|---|---|
| 1930 | 40 | | — |
| 1940 | 68 | | 70.0% |
| 1950 | 131 | | 92.6% |
| 1960 | 106 | | −19.1% |
| 1970 | 103 | | −2.8% |
| 1980 | 77 | | −25.2% |
| 1990 | 77 | | 0.0% |
| 2000 | 130 | | 68.8% |
| 2010 | 115 | | −11.5% |
| 2020 | 111 | | −3.5% |
U.S. Decennial Census

Ekwok first appeared on the 1930 U.S. Census as "Ekwak", an unincorporated village, and again in 1940. The name (or spelling) was changed to Ekwok with the 1950 U.S. Census. It was formally incorporated in 1974.

=== 2020 census ===
As of the 2020 census, Ekwok had a population of 111. The median age was 29.8 years. 29.7% of residents were under the age of 18 and 14.4% of residents were 65 years of age or older. For every 100 females there were 126.5 males, and for every 100 females age 18 and over there were 136.4 males age 18 and over.

0.0% of residents lived in urban areas, while 100.0% lived in rural areas.

There were 36 households in Ekwok, of which 55.6% had children under the age of 18 living in them. Of all households, 41.7% were married-couple households, 30.6% were households with a male householder and no spouse or partner present, and 19.4% were households with a female householder and no spouse or partner present. About 13.9% of all households were made up of individuals and 8.3% had someone living alone who was 65 years of age or older.

There were 52 housing units, of which 30.8% were vacant. The homeowner vacancy rate was 0.0% and the rental vacancy rate was 9.1%.

Racial composition as of the 2020 census
| Race | Number | Percent |
|---|---|---|
| White | 10 | 9.0% |
| Black or African American | 1 | 0.9% |
| American Indian and Alaska Native | 95 | 85.6% |
| Asian | 1 | 0.9% |
| Native Hawaiian and Other Pacific Islander | 0 | 0.0% |
| Some other race | 0 | 0.0% |
| Two or more races | 4 | 3.6% |
| Hispanic or Latino (of any race) | 7 | 6.3% |

=== 2000 census ===
As of the census of 2000, there were 130 people, 42 households, and 29 families residing in the city. The population density was 8.1 inhabitants per square mile (3.1/km^{2}). There were 56 housing units at an average density of 3.5 units per square mile (1.4 units/km^{2}). The racial makeup of the city was 6.15% White, 91.54% Native American, and 2.31% from two or more races.

There were 42 households, out of which 47.6% had children under the age of 18 living with them, 61.9% were married couples living together, 7.1% had a female householder with no husband present, and 28.6% were non-families. 28.6% of all households were made up of individuals, and 4.8% had someone living alone who was 65 years of age or older. The average household size was 3.10 and the average family size was 3.93.

In the city, the age distribution of the population shows 43.8% under the age of 18, 3.8% from 18 to 24, 26.2% from 25 to 44, 19.2% from 45 to 64, and 6.9% who were 65 years of age or older. The median age was 32 years. For every 100 females, there were 113.1 males. For every 100 females age 18 and over, there were 114.7 males.

The median income for a household in the city was $16,250, and the median income for a family was $20,000. Males had a median income of $38,750 versus $35,750 for females. The per capita income for the city was $11,079. There were 29.2% of families and 32.1% of the population living below the poverty line, including 24.4% of under eighteens and 40.0% of those over 64.

== Education ==
The William "Sonny" Nelson School of the Southwest Region School District serves the village.
