= New Stuyahok, Alaska =

New Stuyahok Cetuyaraq
- City
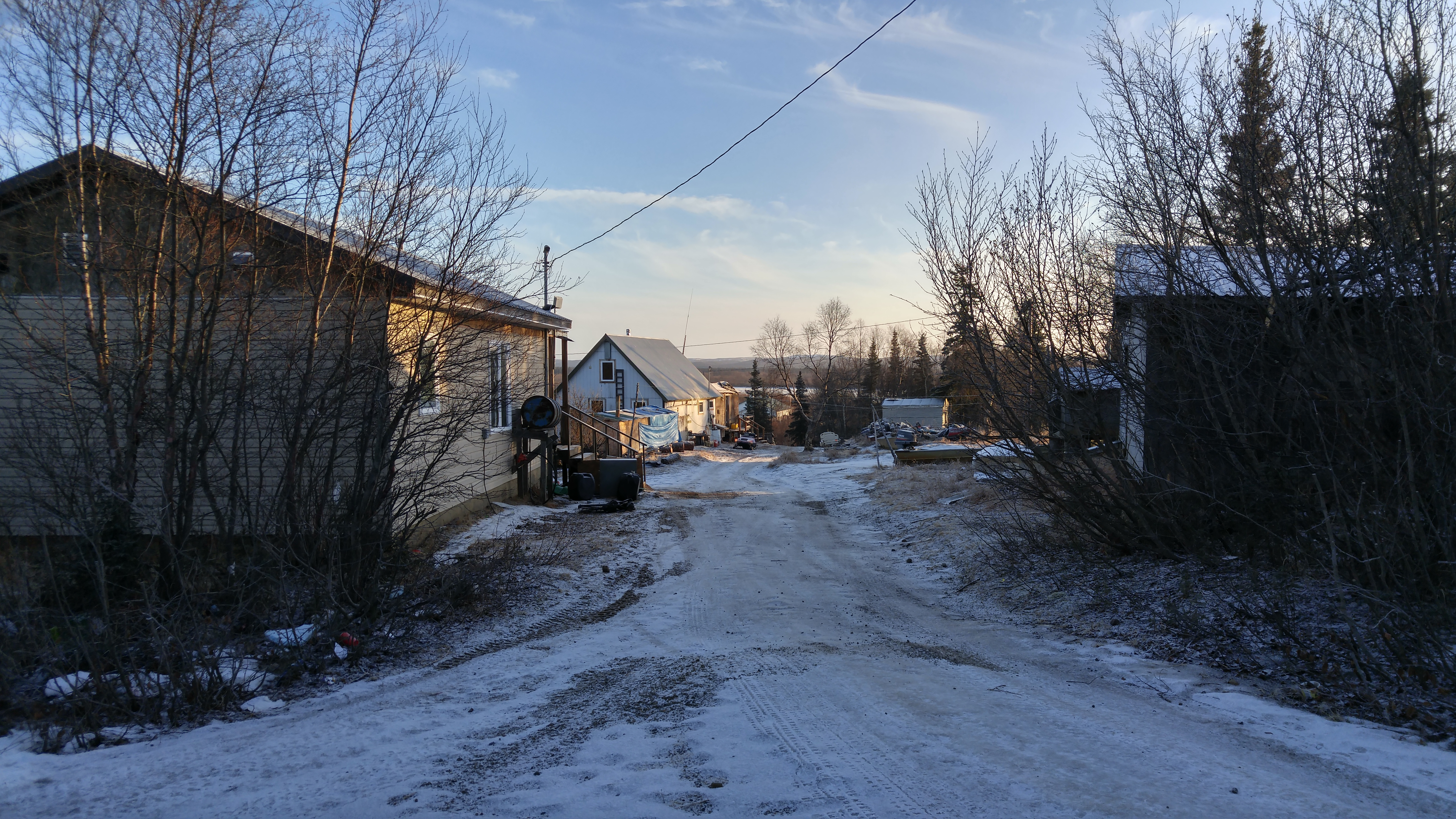
- A street level view of New Stuyahok, Alaska

- Location in Alaska
- Coordinates: 59°27′7″N 157°18′44″W
- Country: United States
- State: Alaska
- Census Area: Dillingham
- Incorporated: November 20, 1972

Government
  - Mayor: Justin Askoak
  - State senator: Lyman Hoffman (D)
  - State rep.: Bryce Edgmon (I)

Area
  - Total: 35.95 sq mi (93.12 km^{2})
  - Land: 33.72 sq mi (87.33 km^{2})
  - Water: 2.24 sq mi (5.80 km^{2})
- Elevation: 138 ft (42 m)

Population (2020)
  - Total: 512
  - Density: 15.2/sq mi (5.86/km^{2})
- Time zone: UTC-9 (Alaska (AKST))
  - Summer (DST): UTC-8 (AKDT)
- ZIP code: 99636
- Area code: 907
- FIPS code: 02-53710
- GNIS feature ID: 1406972

New Stuyahok (Central Yupik: Cetuyaraq) is a city in Dillingham Census Area, Alaska, United States. As of the 2020 census, New Stuyahok had a population of 512.

== Geography ==
New Stuyahok is located at 59°27′7″N 157°18′44″W (59.451850, -157.312106), along the Nushagak River.

According to the United States Census Bureau, the city has a total area of 34.7 square miles (89.9 km^{2}), of which 32.5 square miles (84.1 km^{2}) is land and 2.2 square miles (5.8 km^{2}), or 6.43%, is water.

== Demographics ==
Historical population
| Census | Pop. | Note | %± |
|---|---|---|---|
| 1950 | 88 | | — |
| 1960 | 145 | | 64.8% |
| 1970 | 216 | | 49.0% |
| 1980 | 331 | | 53.2% |
| 1990 | 391 | | 18.1% |
| 2000 | 471 | | 20.5% |
| 2010 | 510 | | 8.3% |
| 2020 | 512 | | 0.4% |
U.S. Decennial Census

New Stuyahok first appeared on the 1950 U.S. Census as an unincorporated village. It formally incorporated in 1972.

=== 2020 census ===
As of the 2020 census, New Stuyahok had a population of 512. The median age was 26.3 years. 38.9% of residents were under the age of 18 and 9.0% were 65 years of age or older.

For every 100 females there were 130.6 males, and for every 100 females age 18 and over there were 126.8 males age 18 and over.

0.0% of residents lived in urban areas, while 100.0% lived in rural areas.

There were 125 households in New Stuyahok, of which 60.0% had children under the age of 18 living in them. Of all households, 47.2% were married-couple households, 22.4% were households with a male householder and no spouse or partner present, and 23.2% were households with a female householder and no spouse or partner present. About 20.8% of all households were made up of individuals and 1.6% had someone living alone who was 65 years of age or older.

There were 125 housing units, of which 0.0% were vacant. The homeowner vacancy rate was 0.0% and the rental vacancy rate was 0.0%.

Racial composition as of the 2020 census
| Race | Number | Percent |
|---|---|---|
| White | 24 | 4.7% |
| Black or African American | 2 | 0.4% |
| American Indian and Alaska Native | 460 | 89.8% |
| Asian | 0 | 0.0% |
| Native Hawaiian and Other Pacific Islander | 0 | 0.0% |
| Some other race | 2 | 0.4% |
| Two or more races | 24 | 4.7% |
| Hispanic or Latino (of any race) | 6 | 1.2% |

=== 2000 census ===
As of the census of 2000, there were 471 people, 105 households, and 91 families residing in the city. The population density was 14.4 inhabitants per square mile (5.6/km^{2}). There were 107 housing units at an average density of 3.3 units per square mile (1.3 units/km^{2}). The racial makeup of the city was 3.82% White, 92.78% Native American, and 3.40% from two or more races. 1.27% of the population were Hispanic or Latino of any race. There were 105 households, out of which 57.1% had children under the age of 18 living with them, 56.2% were married couples living together, 21.0% had a female householder with no husband present, and 13.3% were non-families. 11.4% of all households were made up of individuals, and 1.9% had someone living alone who was 65 years of age or older. The average household size was 4.49 and the average family size was 4.87.

In the city, the age distribution of the population shows 40.8% under the age of 18, 10.4% from 18 to 24, 27.8% from 25 to 44, 16.6% from 45 to 64, and 4.5% who were 65 years of age or older. The median age was 24 years. For every 100 females, there were 122.2 males. For every 100 females age 18 and over, there were 108.2 males.

The median income for a household in the city was $26,042, and the median income for a family was $26,458. Males had a median income of $31,250 versus $41,250 for females. The per capita income for the city was $7,931. About 32.6% of families and 31.7% of the population were below the poverty line, including 43.5% of those under age 18 and 15.4% of those age 65 or over.

== Education ==
The "Chief" Ivan Blunka School of the Southwest Region School District serves the village.
