= Clark's Point, Alaska =

Clark's Point, Alaska Saguyaq
- City
- Location within Alaska
- Country: United States
- State: Alaska
- Census area: Dillingham

Government
  - Mayor: Harry Wassily, Sr.
  - State senator: Lyman Hoffman (D)
  - State rep.: Bryce Edgmon (I)

Area
  - Total: 4.11 sq mi (10.64 km^{2})
  - Land: 3.32 sq mi (8.61 km^{2})
  - Water: 0.78 sq mi (2.03 km^{2})

Population (2020)
  - Total: 67
  - Density: 20.2/sq mi (7.78/km^{2})
- Time zone: UTC-9 (Alaska (AKST))
  - Summer (DST): UTC-8 (AKDT)
- ZIP code: 99569
- Area code: 907
- FIPS code: 02-15430
- GNIS: 1400426

Clark's Point (Central Yupik: Saguyaq) is a city in Dillingham Census Area, Alaska, United States. As of the 2020 census, Clark's Point had a population of 67.

== Geography ==
Clark's Point is located at 58°49′57″N 158°33′09″W.

According to the United States Census Bureau, the city has a total area of 4.1 square miles (11 km^{2}), of which, 3.1 square miles (8.0 km^{2}) of it is land and 0.9 square miles (2.3 km^{2}) of it (22.66%) is water.

== Demographics ==
Historical population
Census	Pop.	Note	%±
1890	7		—
1930	25		—
1940	22		−12.0%
1950	128		481.8%
1960	138		7.8%
1970	95		−31.2%
1980	79		−16.8%
1990	60		−24.1%
2000	75		25.0%
2010	62		−17.3%
2020	67		8.1%
U.S. Decennial Census

Clark's (or Clarks) Point first appeared on the 1890 U.S. Census as the unincorporated Inuit village of "Stugarok." It would not appear again until 1930, when it returned as Clark's Point, also an unincorporated village. It formally incorporated in 1971.

=== 2020 census ===
As of the 2020 census, Clark's Point had a population of 67. The median age was 33.3 years. 31.3% of residents were under the age of 18 and 16.4% were 65 years of age or older. For every 100 females there were 109.4 males, and for every 100 females age 18 and over there were 91.7 males age 18 and over.

0.0% of residents lived in urban areas, while 100.0% lived in rural areas.

There were 24 households in Clark's Point, of which 54.2% had children under the age of 18 living in them. Of all households, 41.7% were married-couple households, 33.3% were households with a male householder and no spouse or partner present, and 12.5% were households with a female householder and no spouse or partner present. About 20.9% of all households were made up of individuals and 4.2% had someone living alone who was 65 years of age or older.

There were 38 housing units, of which 36.8% were vacant. The homeowner vacancy rate was 0.0% and the rental vacancy rate was 0.0%.

Racial composition as of the 2020 census
Race	Number	Percent
White	4	6.0%
Black or African American	0	0.0%
American Indian and Alaska Native	62	92.5%
Asian	0	0.0%
Native Hawaiian and Other Pacific Islander	0	0.0%
Some other race	0	0.0%
Two or more races	1	1.5%
Hispanic or Latino (of any race)	0	0.0%

=== 2000 census ===
As of the census of 2000, there were 75 people, 24 households, and 15 families residing in the city. The population density was 23.9 inhabitants per square mile (9.2/km^{2}). There were 51 housing units at an average density of 16.2 units per square mile (6.3 units/km^{2}). The racial makeup of the city was 6.67% White, 90.67% Native Alaskan, 1.33% Pacific Islander, and 1.33% from two or more races.

There were 24 households, out of which 33.3% had children under the age of 18 living with them, 45.8% were married couples living together, 16.7% had a female householder with no husband present, and 37.5% were non-families. 25.0% of all households were made up of individuals, and 4.2% had someone living alone who was 65 years of age or older. The average household size was 3.13 and the average family size was 3.93.

In the city, the population was spread out, with 38.7% under the age of 18, 6.7% from 18 to 24, 25.3% from 25 to 44, 21.3% from 45 to 64, and 8.0% who were 65 years of age or older. The median age was 30 years. For every 100 females, there were 114.3 males. For every 100 females age 18 and over, there were 119.0 males.

The median income for a household in the city was $28,125, and the median income for a family was $41,250. Males had a median income of $30,625 versus $41,250 for females. The per capita income for the city was $10,988. There were 20.0% of families and 45.7% of the population living below the poverty line, including 66.7% of under eighteens and 36.4% of those over 64.

== Education ==
It was previously served by the Clarks Point School, operated by the Southwest Region School District. Due to declining enrollment, the school closed in May 2012. The Clark's Point school re-opened in August 2017.
