= Dillingham Census Area, Alaska =

Census area in Alaska, United States

- Borough
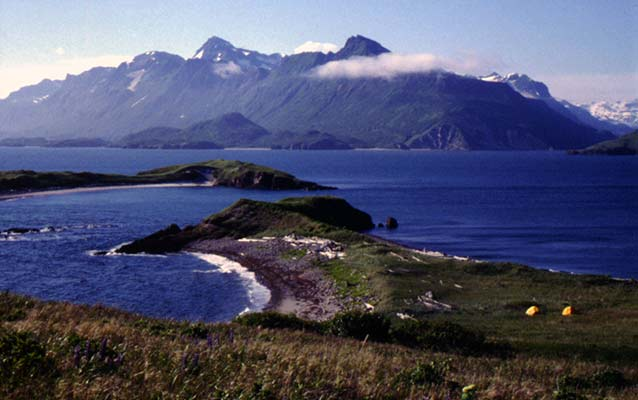
- Amalik Bay Archeological District

- Location within the U.S. state of Alaska
- Coordinates: 59°57′N 158°26′W
- Country: United States
- State: Alaska
- Established: 1980
- Largest city: Dillingham

Area
  - Total: 20,915 sq mi (54,170 km^{2})
  - Land: 18,569 sq mi (48,090 km^{2})
  - Water: 2,346 sq mi (6,080 km^{2}) 11.2%

Population (2020)
  - Total: 4,857
  - Estimate (2025): 4,483 ▼
  - Density: 0.26/sq mi (0.10/km^{2})
- Time zone: UTC−9 (Alaska)
  - Summer (DST): UTC−8 (ADT)
- Congressional district: At-large

Dillingham Census Area is a census area located in the state of Alaska, United States. At the 2020 census, the population was 4,857, slightly up from 4,847 in 2010. It is part of the unorganized borough and therefore has no borough seat. Its largest community by far is the city of Dillingham, on a small arm of Bristol Bay on the Bering Sea.

== Geography ==
According to the U.S. Census Bureau, the census area has a total area of 20,915 square miles (54,170 km^{2}), of which 18,569 square miles (48,090 km^{2}) is land and 2,346 square miles (6,080 km^{2}) (11.2%) is water.

=== Adjacent boroughs and census areas ===
- Bethel Census Area, Alaska - west/north
- Bristol Bay Borough, Alaska
- Lake and Peninsula Borough, Alaska - east

=== National protected areas ===
- Alaska Maritime National Wildlife Refuge (part of the Bering Sea unit)
  - Hagemeister Island
- Togiak National Wildlife Refuge (part)
  - Togiak Wilderness (part)

== Demographics ==
Historical population
Census	Pop.	Note	%±
1960	4,024		—
1970	3,485		−13.4%
1980	4,616		32.5%
1990	4,012		−13.1%
2000	4,922		22.7%
2010	4,847		−1.5%
2020	4,857		0.2%
2025 (est.)	4,483	▼	−7.7%
U.S. Decennial Census; 1790-1960 1900-1990; 1990-2000 2010-2020

=== 2020 census ===
Dillingham Census Area, Alaska – Racial and ethnic composition Note: the US Census treats Hispanic/Latino as an ethnic category. This table excludes Latinos from the racial categories and assigns them to a separate category. Hispanics/Latinos may be of any race.
Race / Ethnicity (NH = Non-Hispanic)	Pop 1980	Pop 1990	Pop 2000	Pop 2010	Pop 2020	% 1980	% 1990	% 2000	% 2010	% 2020
White alone (NH)	1,051	1,007	1,031	855	770	22.77%	25.10%	20.95%	17.64%	15.85%
Black or African American alone (NH)	1	8	18	11	19	0.02%	0.20%	0.37%	0.23%	0.39%
Native American or Alaska Native alone (NH)	3,520	2,917	3,415	3,431	3,412	76.26%	72.71%	69.38%	70.79%	70.25%
Asian alone (NH)	7	25	30	32	45	0.15%	0.62%	0.61%	0.66%	0.93%
Native Hawaiian or Pacific Islander alone (NH)	x	x	1	6	9	x	x	0.02%	0.12%	0.19%
Other race alone (NH)	14	6	6	1	7	0.30%	0.15%	0.12%	0.02%	0.14%
Mixed race or Multiracial (NH)	x	x	310	410	449	x	x	6.30%	8.46%	9.24%
Hispanic or Latino (any race)	23	49	111	101	146	0.50%	1.22%	2.26%	2.08%	3.01%
Total	4,616	4,012	4,922	4,847	4,857	100.00%	100.00%	100.00%	100.00%	100.00%

As of the 2020 census, the county had a population of 4,857. The median age was 31.3 years, 31.7% of residents were under the age of 18, and 10.5% were 65 years of age or older. For every 100 females there were 105.9 males, and for every 100 females age 18 and over there were 109.5 males age 18 and over.

The racial makeup of the county was 16.5% White, 0.5% Black or African American, 71.1% American Indian and Alaska Native, 1.0% Asian, 0.2% Native Hawaiian and Pacific Islander, 0.6% from some other race, and 10.2% from two or more races. Hispanic or Latino residents of any race comprised 3.0% of the population.

0.0% of residents lived in urban areas, while 100.0% lived in rural areas.

There were 1,558 households in the county, of which 42.6% had children under the age of 18 living with them and 25.6% had a female householder with no spouse or partner present. About 27.0% of all households were made up of individuals and 7.1% had someone living alone who was 65 years of age or older.

There were 2,405 housing units, of which 35.2% were vacant. Among occupied housing units, 63.7% were owner-occupied and 36.3% were renter-occupied. The homeowner vacancy rate was 0.6% and the rental vacancy rate was 9.3%.

=== 2000 census ===
At the 2000 census there were 4,922 people, 1,529 households, and 1,105 families living in the census area. The population density was 0 people per square mile (0 people/km^{2}). There were 2,332 housing units at an average density of 0 per square mile (0/km^{2}). The racial makeup of the census area was 21.64% White, 0.37% Black or African American, 70.13% Native American, 0.61% Asian, 0.02% Pacific Islander, 0.55% from other races, and 6.68% from two or more races. 2.26% of the population were Hispanic or Latino of any race. 34.6% reported speaking Yupik or Eskimo at home . Of the 1,529 households 45.30% had children under the age of 18 living with them, 51.10% were married couples living together, 15.00% had a female householder with no husband present, and 27.70% were non-families. 23.30% of households were one person and 3.60% were one person aged 65 or older. The average household size was 3.20 and the average family size was 3.84.

The age distribution was 38.10% under the age of 18, 7.70% from 18 to 24, 28.90% from 25 to 44, 19.50% from 45 to 64, and 5.70% 65 or older. The median age was 29 years. For every 100 females, there were 109.00 males. For every 100 females age 18 and over, there were 108.80 males. The per capita income is estimated at 23,500 U.S. dollars per year.

== Politics ==
United States presidential election results for Dillingham Census Area, Alaska
Year	Republican		Democratic		Third party(ies)	
Year	No.	%	No.	%	No.	%
1960	192	41.03%	276	58.97%	0	0.00%
1964	156	23.18%	517	76.82%	0	0.00%
1968	340	49.93%	320	46.99%	21	3.08%
1972	365	51.63%	312	44.13%	30	4.24%
1976	512	53.39%	411	42.86%	36	3.75%
1980	378	36.84%	477	46.49%	171	16.67%
1984	1,055	66.98%	461	29.27%	59	3.75%
1988	800	58.18%	520	37.82%	55	4.00%
1992	707	45.67%	535	34.56%	306	19.77%
1996	544	39.00%	643	46.09%	208	14.91%
2000	891	53.90%	592	35.81%	170	10.28%
2004	797	58.47%	521	38.22%	45	3.30%
2008	1,084	54.66%	851	42.91%	48	2.42%
2012	592	36.12%	967	59.00%	80	4.88%
2016	660	34.59%	992	51.99%	256	13.42%
2020	822	43.10%	984	51.60%	101	5.30%
2024	763	50.70%	670	44.52%	72	4.78%

Dillingham Census Area is quite competitive in presidential elections.

== Communities ==
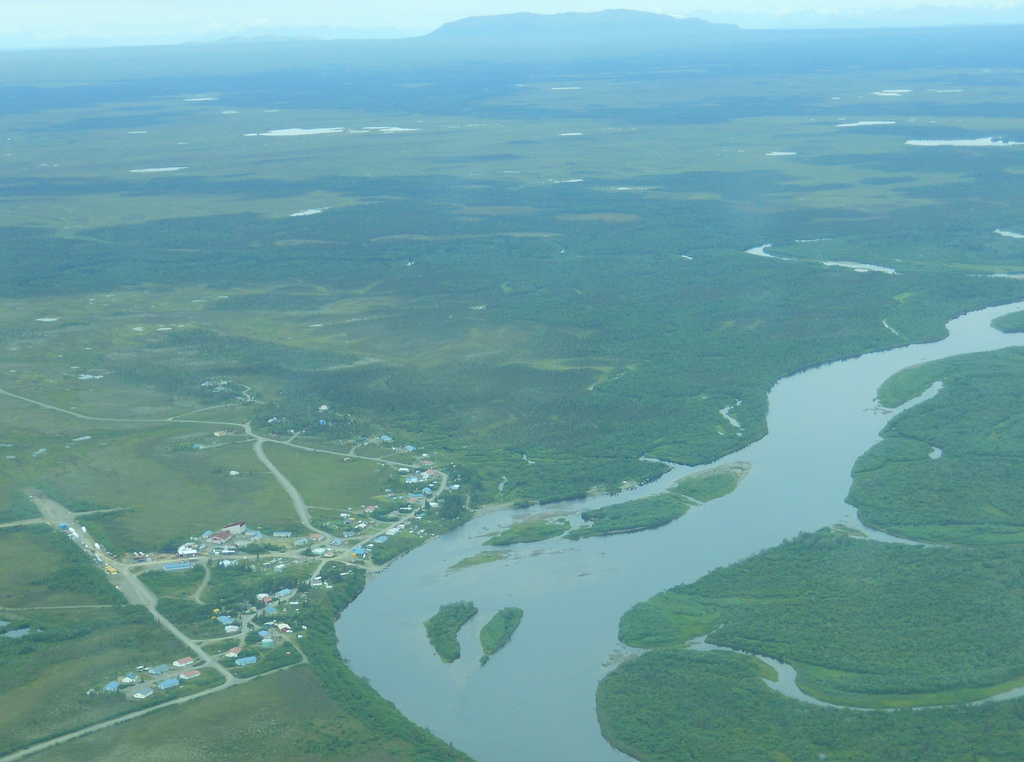
Koliganek and the Nushagak River

=== Cities ===
- Aleknagik
- Clark's Point
- Dillingham
- Ekwok
- Manokotak
- New Stuyahok
- Togiak

=== Census-designated places ===
- Koliganek
- Portage Creek
- Twin Hills

== See also ==
- List of mountain peaks of North America
  - List of mountain peaks of the United States
    - List of mountain peaks of Alaska
- List of airports in the Dillingham Census Area
