= Bella Hammond =

American activist, First Lady of Alaska and commercial fisherman

First Lady of Alaska
- In role December 2, 1974 – December 6, 1982
- Governor: Jay Hammond
- Preceded by: Neva Egan
- Succeeded by: Michael Margaret Stewart (1986)

Personal details
- Born: Bella Gardiner; December 12, 1932 Kanakanak, Territory of Alaska
- Died: February 29, 2020 (aged 87) Alaska
- Spouse: Jay Hammond (m. 1952; died 2005)
- Children: 2

Bella Hammond (born Bella Gardiner, December 21, 1932 – February 29, 2020) was an American activist and commercial fisherman. Hammond served as the First Lady of Alaska from 1974 until 1982 during the tenure of her husband, former Governor Jay Hammond. She was the first person of Alaska Native descent to reside in the Alaska Governor's Mansion.

Hammond was a vocal opponent of the proposed Pebble Mine in the Bristol Bay region of Southwest Alaska.

== Biography ==
=== Early life ===
Hammond was born Bella Gardiner on December 21, 1932, in the village of Kanakanak, Territory of Alaska, as the fourth of her family's seven children. Her mother, Lydia Snyder, was Alaskan Yup'ik, while her father, Thomas Gardiner, had immigrated to Alaska from Scotland. Hammond's maternal Yup'ik grandparents both died in the 1918 flu pandemic, which devastated Native Alaskan communities, and her mother had been raised in an orphanage in Kanakanak.

Hammond was raised in Kanakanak, located about six miles from Dillingham, and attended the village's one room schoolhouse. Fishing was an important part of her family's lifestyle. When she was around 12-years old, a school teacher in Aleknagik, who suffered from a heart condition, asked her parents if Bella could spend the winter at her home to look after her children. Hammond spent the time babysitting the teacher's children, which she credited with instilling an early sense of responsibility. During her winter weekends in Aleknagik, Hammond ran a dog sled team.

Her family later moved to nearby Dillingham, where she graduated high school as class valedictorian. She worked as both a doctor's assistant and a waitress at the nearby Clark's Point cannery during her teenage years.

Bella Hammond was a 17-year-old high school student when she first met Jay Hammond, a pilot for the U.S. Fish and Wildlife Service, at a dance in Dillingham. Two years later, the couple married in 1952 in a ceremony in Palmer, Alaska. It was her first marriage and his second. They had two daughters, Heidi and Dana, in addition to Jay Hammond's daughter, Wendy, from his first marriage. They raised their two daughters in Naknek, Alaska.

During the mid-1950s, Bella Hammond established her own commercial fishing company, using setnets, on the shores of the Naknek River. She divided her time between Juneau and Naknek once her husband joined the Alaska House of Representatives in 1959. She returned to the Naknek River and Bristol Bay every summer to continue her fishing operations for years after Jay Hammond became involved in state politics.

=== First Lady of Alaska ===
Jay Hammond was elected Governor of Alaska in 1974. Bella Hammond became First Lady of Alaska, a role she would hold for the governor's two terms in office. Hammond was the first Native Alaskan to reside in the state Governor's Mansion.

While living in the Alaska Governor's Mansion, she could be found working on the house's gardens and landscaping, where she was sometimes mistaken for a groundskeeper. Bella Hammond continued to return to fishing operations at Bristol Bay and the Naknek River each summer throughout her husband's tenure.

Bella Hammond took an active interest in her role as first lady. In 1975, Hammond established the First Lady's Volunteer Awards to recognize Alaskan volunteers and their charitable contributions to the state. Since its establishment by Hammond, the First Lady's Volunteer Awards have honored hundreds of individual Alaskans. The annual tradition has been continued by each of her successors as first lady or first gentleman.

Hammond was diagnosed with breast cancer during the governor's second term. The governor contemplated resigning from office following his wife's diagnosis, but Hammond said no and encouraged him to remain in office. Instead, Bella Hammond went public with her diagnosis and continued her role as first lady during chemotherapy and other treatments. Hammond became a vocal advocate for breast cancer prevention, awareness, and issues related to healthcare.

=== Later life ===
Once they left the governor's mansion in 1982, Bella and Jay Hammond retired to their log cabin homestead on the northern shores of Lake Clark. The Hammond homestead was only accessible by floatplane or a 10-mile boat trip from Port Alsworth. However, despite the isolation of their home, the Hammonds remained engaged in civic life and state politics.

Hammond and five other former Alaskan first ladies were the subjects of a 2005 KTOO-TV television documentary. In August 2008, then-Governor Sarah Palin honored Bella Hammond, as well as former first ladies Neva Egan, Ermalee Hickel, Susan Knowles and Nancy Murkowski, at an official ceremony and luncheon to commemorate the 50th anniversary of Alaskan statehood.

During the 2012 Alaska state elections, Bella Hammond endorsed a bipartisan slate of lawmakers running for re-election to the Alaska Senate. Bella Hammond and former Alaska First Lady Ermalee Hickel partnered to re-establish "Backbone Alaska", a political group which had originally been established in 1999 by former governors Jay Hammond and Wally Hickel to oppose perceived oil company concessions by then-Governor Tony Knowles' administration during the merger of BP and ARCO. Bella Hammond's and Ermalee Hickel's newly resurrected Backbone Alaska also sought to counter the influence of the oil industry in Alaskan politics. The former First Ladies supported the Alaska Senate's Bipartisan Working Group, which had criticized oil tax reform and concessions to oil companies operating in Alaska between 2010 and 2012. In an October 2012 press release in support of bipartisan efforts in the Alaska Senate, Hammond and Hickel stated, "As our husbands were known for putting Alaska first, we, too, are dedicated to this guiding principal. Now, multi-national corporations are attacking those Alaska legislators running for re-election who stood together in the past session to protect Alaska's interests." Hammond and Hickel jointly endorsed several members of the Bipartisan Working Group who were running for re-election in 2012, including state Senators Hollis French, Joe Paskvan, Joe Thomas, and Bill Wielechowski. The first ladies' support for the Bipartisan Working Group was also backed by other prominent Alaskan political figures, including Vic Fischer.

In 2017, Bella Hammond was awarded an Honorary Doctor of Humane Letters by the University of Alaska Anchorage.

On September 6, 2018, the National Park Service officially named 2.6 million acres of Lake Clark National Park and Preserve, located near Hammond's home, as the Jay S. Hammond Wilderness Area. Bella Hammond and other family members attended the ceremony.

Bella Hammond died on February 29, 2020, at the age of 87. She was survived by her daughters, Heidi and Dana, and stepdaughter, Wendy Hammond.
