= Ermalee Hickel =

American public figure and philanthropist (1925–2017)

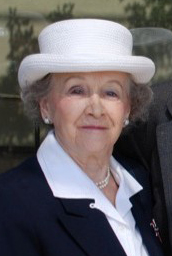
- Hickel in 2008

First Lady of Alaska
- In role December 3, 1990 – December 5, 1994
- Governor: Wally Hickel
- Preceded by: Michael Margaret Stewart
- Succeeded by: Susan Knowles
- In role December 5, 1966 – January 29, 1969
- Governor: Wally Hickel
- Preceded by: Neva Egan
- Succeeded by: Diana Miller

Personal details
- Born: Ermalee Strutz; September 11, 1925 Anchorage, Territory of Alaska, U.S.
- Died: September 14, 2017 (aged 92) Anchorage, Alaska, U.S.
- Party: Republican
- Spouse: Wally Hickel (m. 1945; died 2010)
- Children: 6

Ermalee Hickel (September 11, 1925 – September 14, 2017) was an American public figure and philanthropist who served as the second and seventh First Lady of Alaska from 1966 to 1969 and again from 1990 to 1994. She was the wife of the former Governor of Alaska Wally Hickel and one of the last members of Alaska's generation of pioneer political families.

== Early life ==
Hickel, the youngest of six children, was born Ermalee Strutz in Anchorage, Alaska, on September 11, 1925, to Aline and Louis Strutz. Her family, who had arrived as pioneers in Anchorage in 1917, settled in a small cottage-style house located at Ninth Avenue and P Street near the Cook Inlet. The home still stands, as of 2017. The family raised cows on a piece of nearby land now known as the Delaney Park Strip. Hickel's father, a United States Army sergeant, had been stationed in Alaska. Her family was also affiliated with the now defunct National Bank of Alaska.

Strutz was the editor of her high school newspaper, as well as an usher in the Fourth Avenue Theatre. She later found work at the Port of Anchorage's seafood cannery before becoming a secretary at Fort Richardson, which is now part of Elmendorf Air Force Base, during the early 1940s.

Ermalee Strutz met her future husband, Wally Hickel, soon after the sudden death of his first wife, Janice, from an infection in 1943. Wally Hickel had married Janice Cannon in 1941. Janice Hickel had been friends with Ermalee Strutz. Hickel, now a widower with a baby son, remembered that his late wife had praised Strutz. By coincidence, both worked at Fort Richardson, where she was a typist and secretary and he was an aircraft inspector. Wally Hickel soon met her on Fort Richardson. The couple married on Thanksgiving on November 22, 1945, in a Catholic wedding ceremony held at Holy Family Church, located on the site of the present-day Holy Family Old Cathedral. In addition to Hickel's son, Ted, from his first marriage, the couple had five more sons. They eventually settled in Anchorage's Turnagain neighborhood near Fish Creek.

The Hickels purchased and renovated a small house soon after their wedding. They later sold the home, which launched Wally Hickel's entry into the real estate business. He utilized the profits from the sale of the home to purchase, flip, and sell three more homes in Anchorage's Spenard neighborhood.

== Public career ==
Ermalee Hickel became actively involved in Alaskan politics once her husband entered the political arena in the 1950s. Political observers have credited Ermalee Hickel with helping to launch her husband's political career and the couple viewed their business and political ventures as a partnership. Wally Hickel had dyslexia, so Ermalee recorded his dictations on her typewriter and helped him with his speeches. Throughout their public service careers, Ermalee Hickel's calm demeanor was seen as a counterbalance to Wally Hickel's more impulsive personality. The former governor later described his wife as "beautiful as a butterfly, but tough as a boot."

In 1964, Ermalee and Wally Hickel began construction on their Hotel Captain Cook. She did the hotel's interior design and remained active in staffing decisions through the 1980s. During the mid-1960s, Ermalee Hickel also co-founded a charity that later became Catholic Social Services.

=== First Lady of Alaska ===
Wally Hickel, a Republican, was elected the second Governor of Alaska in 1966, narrowly defeating incumbent Governor Bill Egan. The election of her husband made Hickel the second First Lady in the state's short history. Hickel, who was raising six sons at the time, stuck largely to ceremonial roles during her first tenure as Alaska's first lady from 1966 to 1969. She hosted dignitaries, including aviator Charles Lindbergh, whose pants she ironed shortly before his address to the Alaska Legislature. The Hickels left office in 1969 when Gov. Hickel was confirmed as United States Secretary of the Interior. Nixon fired Hickel less than a year later after the Secretary criticized his Vietnam War policy. Ermalee Hickel later hosted Nixon during his trip to Alaska in 1971, despite the firing.

By contrast, Ermalee Hickel took a much more active role during her second tenure as First Lady from 1990 to 1994 by focusing on social issues. Her public causes and initiatives included preventative healthcare, substance abuse and suicide prevention, homelessness, addiction recovery and rehabilitation, as well as the issues affecting young people and the elderly in the state.

Hickel traveled extensively throughout Alaska as first lady. She was known to eat lunch with inmates at juvenile detention facilities and Alaska Pioneer Homes for the elderly, as well as soup kitchens in Juneau, the state capitol. She would then reports problems or other issues to the Governor or his staff in the governor's office.

Notably, Hickel persuaded the governor to support the Alaska Permanent Fund dividend after traveling and hearing, first hand, how many Alaskans relied on the program. Governor Hickel had initially opposed the dividend before his wife's intervention.

First Lady Hickel lobbied to successfully enact new benefits for families to care for disabled children or adults living at home. She also worked to raise the public's awareness of alcoholism and fetal alcoholism. A literacy advocate, Hickel always carried a copy of Dr. Seuss' "Are You My Mother?" when invited to read with elementary school students.

=== Later life ===
A philanthropist, Hickel and her husband jointly established the Walter J. and Ermalee Hickel Alaska Foundation as a fund within the Alaska Community Foundation. She also created the Hickel House at Providence Alaska Medical Center, which provides accommodations for outpatients and their families. Additionally, Hickel was a member of the boards of directors or patron of numerous civic, cultural, and political organizations, including the Pioneers of Alaska, the Alaska SeaLife Center, the President's Forum at Alaska Pacific University, the Anchorage Symphony League, the Knights and Ladies of the Holy Sepulcher, the Alaska Republican Women's Club, the Women's Resource Center, the Salvation Army, and the Alaska Botanical Garden.

Hickel and five other former Alaskan first ladies were the subjects of a 2005 KTOO-TV television documentary. In August 2008, then-Governor Sarah Palin honored Ermalee Hickel, as well as former first ladies Neva Egan, Bella Hammond, Susan Knowles and Nancy Murkowski, at an official ceremony and luncheon to commemorate the 50th anniversary of Alaskan statehood. In a 2012 interview, Ermalee Hickel discussed her involvement in Alaska politics for the documentary, Alaska, the World and Walter Hickel (2013).

During the 2012 Alaska state elections, Ermalee Hickel re-entered active politics by endorsing a bipartisan slate of lawmakers running for re-election to the Alaska Senate. Hickel and former Alaska First Lady Bella Hammond partnered to re-establish Backbone Alaska, a political group which had originally been established in 1999 by former governors Wally Hickel and Jay Hammond to oppose perceived oil company concessions by then-Governor Tony Knowles' administration during the merger of BP and ARCO. Bella Hammond's and Ermalee Hickel's newly resurrected Backbone Alaska also sought to counter the influence of the oil industry in Alaskan politics. The former First Ladies supported the Alaska Senate's Bipartisan Working Group, which had criticized oil tax reform and concessions to oil companies operating in Alaska between 2010 and 2012. In an October 2012 press release in support of bipartisan efforts in the Alaska Senate, Hickel and Hammond stated, "As our husbands were known for putting Alaska first, we, too, are dedicated to this guiding principal. Now, multi-national corporations are attacking those Alaska legislators running for re-election who stood together in the past session to protect Alaska's interests." Hammond and Hickel jointly endorsed several members of the Bipartisan Working Group who were running for re-election in 2012, including state Senators Hollis French, Joe Paskvan, Joe Thomas, and Bill Wielechowski. The first ladies' support for the Bipartisan Working Group was backed by other prominent Alaskan political figures, including Vic Fischer.

== Personal life and death ==
Hickel's husband of 65 years, former Governor Wally Hickel, died on May 7, 2010, at the age of 90. Ermalee Hickel died at home in Anchorage on September 14, 2017, at the age of 92. She was survived by her six sons and their wives, as well as sixteen grandchildren and great-grandchildren. In a statement marking her death, Alaska Governor Bill Walker praised her contributions to the state, calling her "a giant of history." Her memorial service was held at Our Lady of Guadalupe Co-Cathedral in Anchorage on October 18, 2017.

Hickel was buried beside her husband in Anchorage Memorial Park. Like her husband, the former first lady was buried standing up facing Washington, D.C. In 2010, Governor Wally Hickel had famously requested to also be buried standing up in the direction of the U.S. capital. According to their son, Jack, the Hickels had requested the unusual burial arrangement, recalling "He [Governor Hickel] said if they don't do it right he's going to crawl out of his grave and straighten them out...He thought they were going to screw everything up. He wanted to keep his eye on them."

== See also ==
- Wally Hickel
- Jack Hickel
