= Nushagak, Alaska =

Unincorporated community in the state of Alaska, United States

Coordinates: 58°56′53″N 158°29′32″W

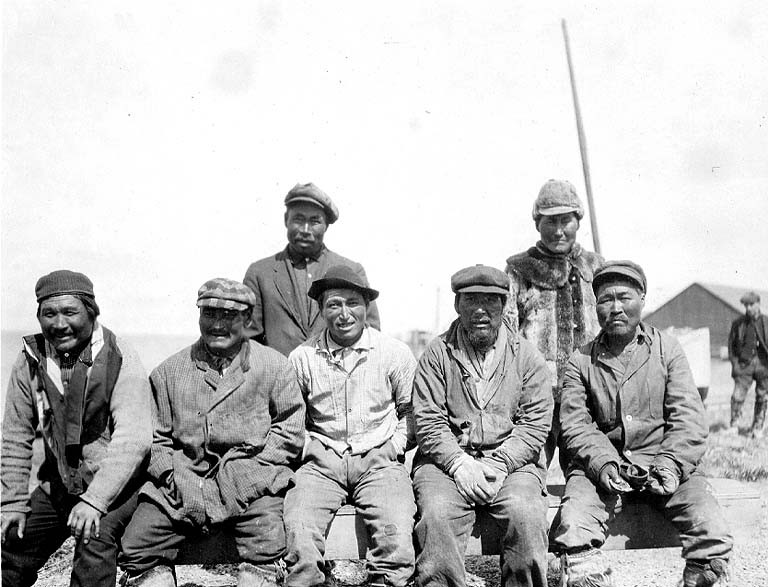
Indigenous Alaskans in Nushagak, 1917

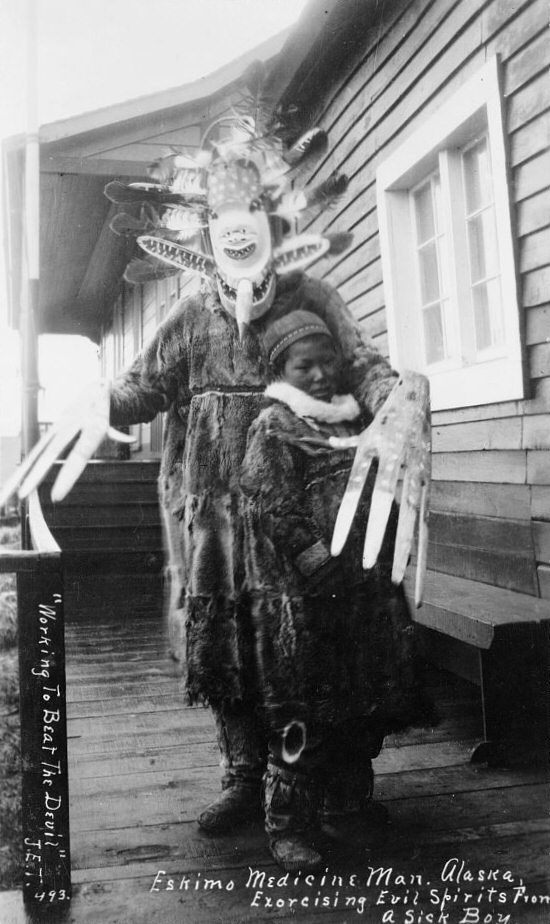
Yupik shaman at Nushagak (ca. 1890s).

Nushagak was a trade center and settlement near the present-day site of Dillingham, Alaska, United States, at the northern end of Nushagak Bay in northern Bristol Bay. It was located near the confluence of the Wood River and Nushagak Rivers.

== History ==
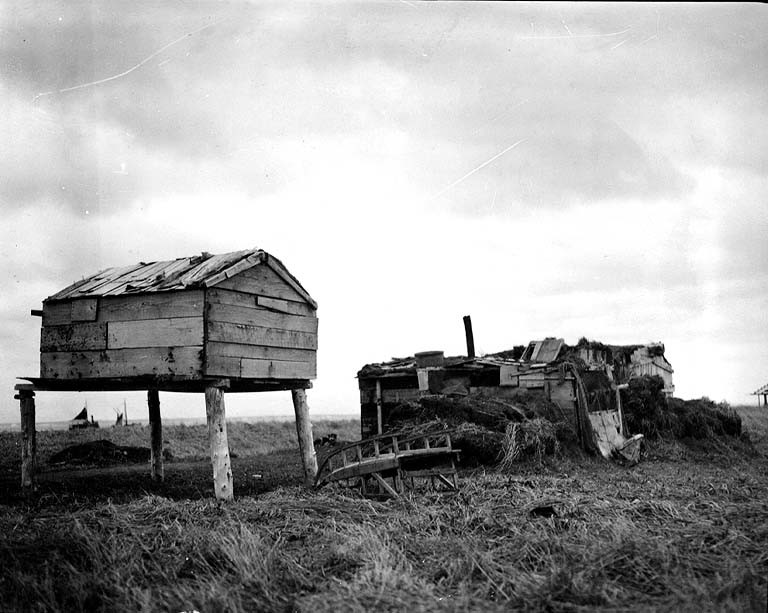
Food cache and barabara sod hut in Nushagak, 1917

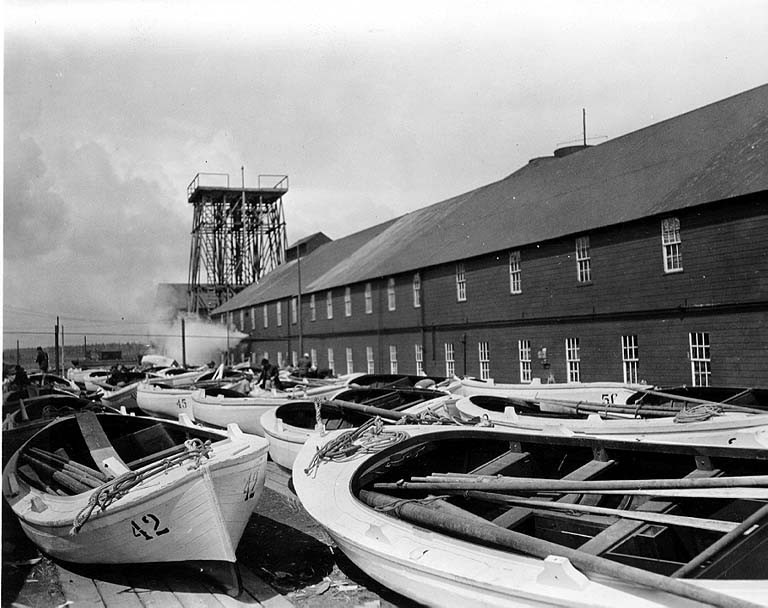
Getting the fishing boats ready at P.H.J.

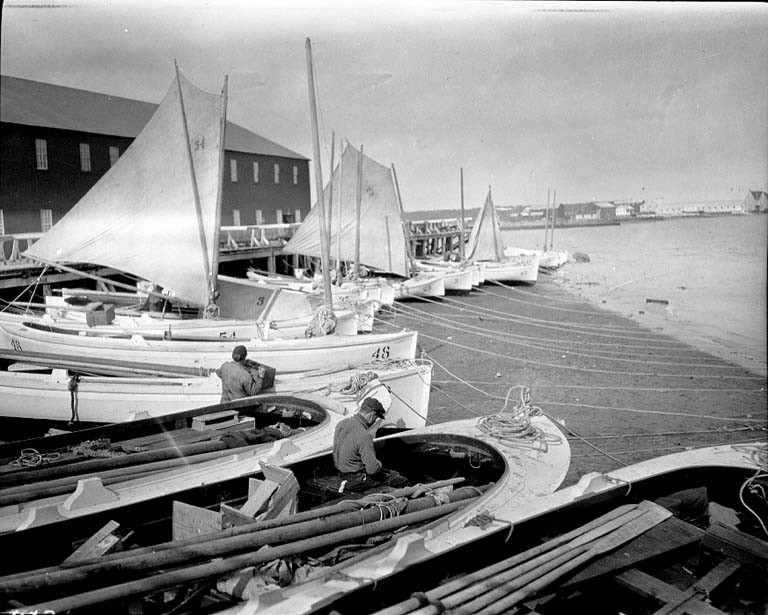
Fishing boats at a cannery in Nushagak, 1917

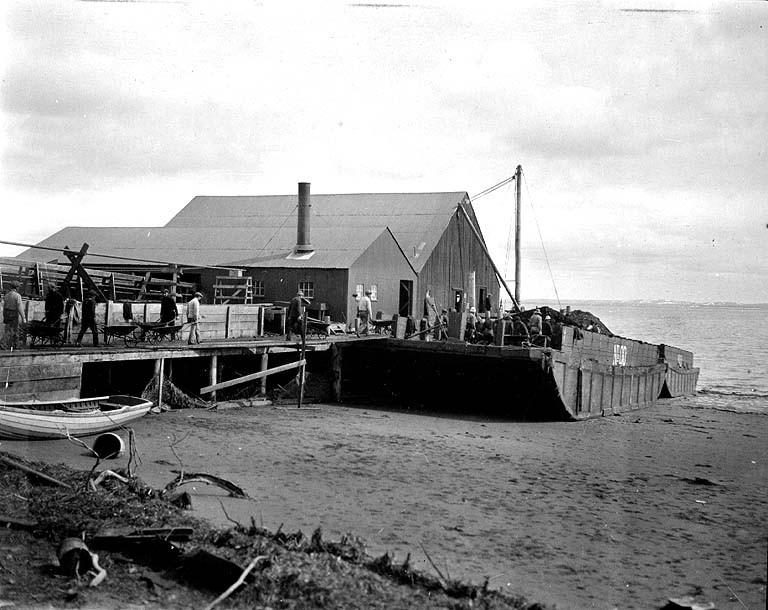
Wharf and scows at P.H.J.

The area was inhabited by Yup'ik people and Athabaskan peoples. In 1818 Russians built the post of Alexandrovski Redoubt (Post) there. A Russian Orthodox mission was established there in 1837, by which time the community was known as Nushagak. Nushagak became a place where different Alaska Native groups from the Kuskokwim River, the Alaska Peninsula and Cook Inlet came to trade or live.

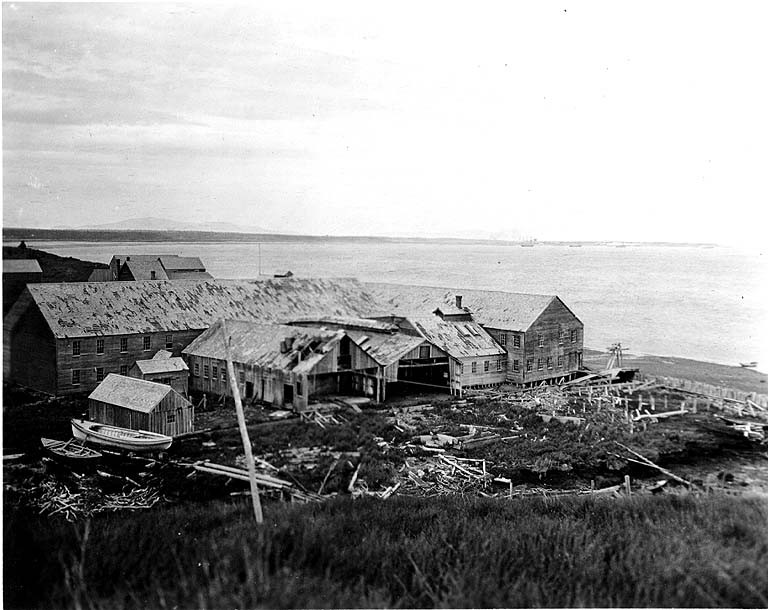
Old Bradford Cannery in Nushagak, 1917

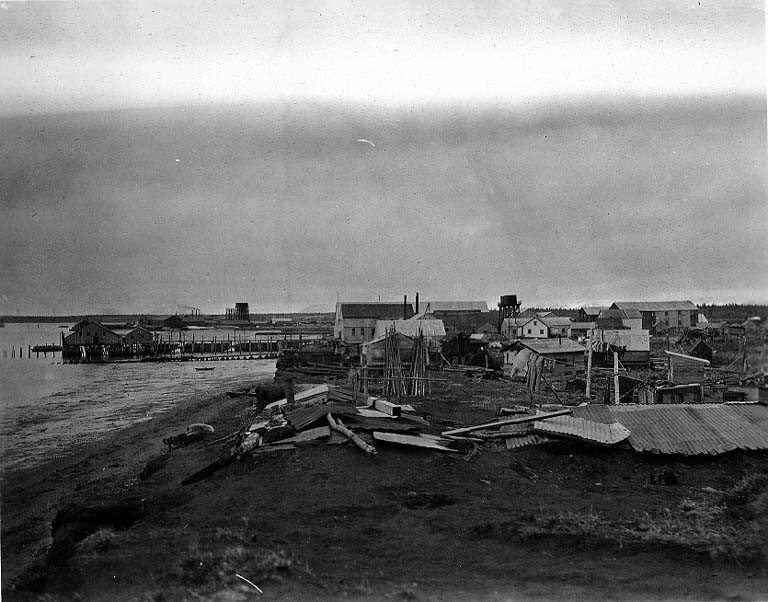
Canneries in Nushagak, 1917

In 1881, after the Alaska Purchase by the United States, the United States Signal Corps built a weather station at Nushagak. The first salmon cannery in the Bristol Bay region was constructed by Arctic Packing Company in 1883 at Kanulik, just east of Nushagak Point. Several other canneries followed, two of which were at Nushagak Point.

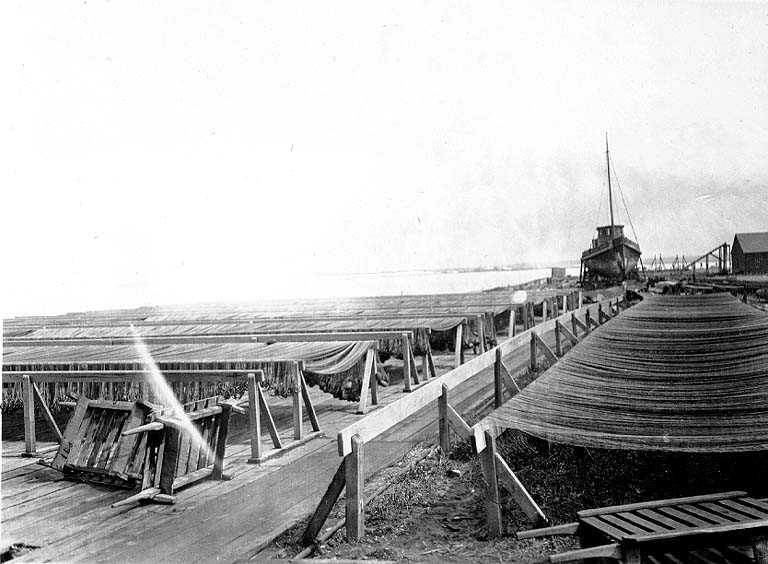
Gillnets on drying racks in Nushagak, 1917

The Pacific Steam Whaling Company built a cannery there in 1899 with Crescent Porter Hale as its first superintendent. It was bought by Pacific Packing and Navigation Co in 1901 and after its demise, Northwestern Fisheries Co. in 1904. Pacific American Fisheries bought the property in 1933 along with others in the region but never operated the Nushagak cannery. It was leased to Lowes Trading Company in 1936 and closed after the 1937 season following death of Lowes' manager, Alex Bradford, and reports of financial difficulties. The second cannery built in 1899 was owned by the Alaska Fisherman's Packing Co. It was bought by Libby, McNeill and Libby in 1916 and operated until 1936.

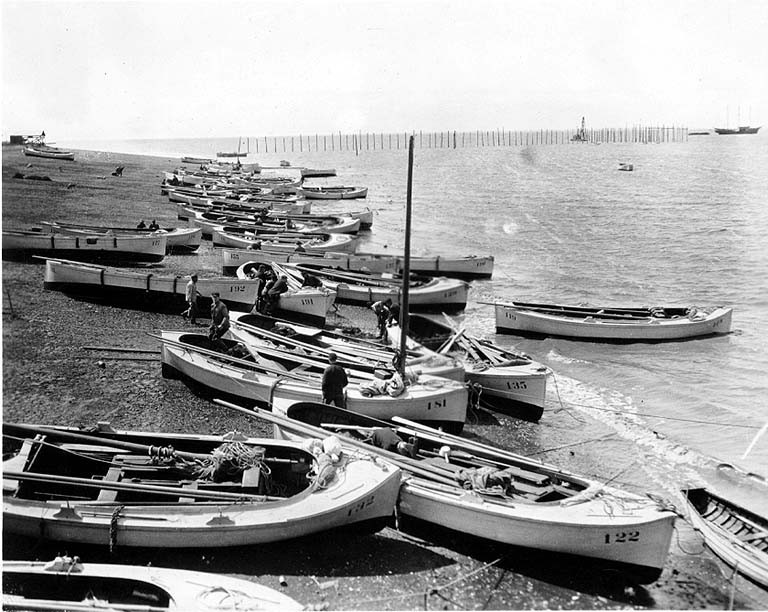
Gillnet boats and fishermen on the beach in Nushagak, 1917

Despite the commanding position that the Point offered over the entire upper Nushagak Bay, it suffered from extensive and growing mud flats that limited access to vessels except during the bay's extreme high tides. Nushagak Point remains the location of some productive salmon set net sites. Artifacts from the cannery era, such as donkey engines, still remain.

The world wide influenza pandemic of 1918 devastated the region in 1919, and contributed to the depopulation of Nushagak. After the epidemic a hospital and orphanage were established in Kanakanak, across the river and 6 miles (10 km) from the present-day city center of Dillingham.

== Demographics ==
Historical population
Census	Pop.	Note	%±
1880	178		—
1890	268		50.6%
1900	324		20.9%
1910	74		−77.2%
1920	16		−78.4%
1930	43		168.8%
1940	41		−4.7%
U.S. Decennial Census

Nushagak first reported on the 1880 U.S. Census as an unincorporated village (spelled "Nushegak" and with the alternative name of "Alexandrovsk.") It reported 178 residents, of which 91 were Inuit, 86 were Creole (Mixed Russian and Native) and 1 White. In 1890, it reported as Nushagak, which also included the weather station, Nushagak Cannery & Hunters Camp. It had 268 residents, of which a plurality (99) were Asian (imported workers for the canneries), 85 were Natives, 64 were White and 20 were Creole.

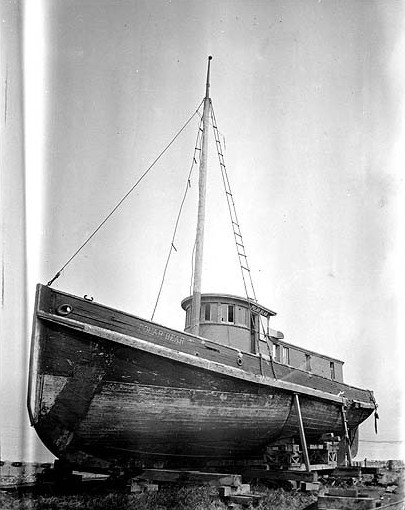
A new ship named Polar Bear in dry dock, Nushagak 1917

In 1900, it reported 324 residents, but did not return the racial demographics. With the closure of the canneries, the population dropped precipitously. It did not report again after the 1940 census, though the Geographical Survey Professional Paper on Alaska reported an unofficial population of 7 in 1958.
