= WKK =

WKK may refer to:

- WKK, the IATA code for Aleknagik Airport, an airport in Aleknagik, Alaska, United States
- WKK, the National Rail code for Wakefield Kirkgate railway station, West Yorkshire, England
