= Krimmer =

Krimmer is a surname. Notable people with the surname include:

- Robert Krimmer (born 1953), American lawyer and actor
- Sebastian Krimmer (born 1990), German gymnast
