= Aleknagik Lake =

Lake in the state of Alaska, United States

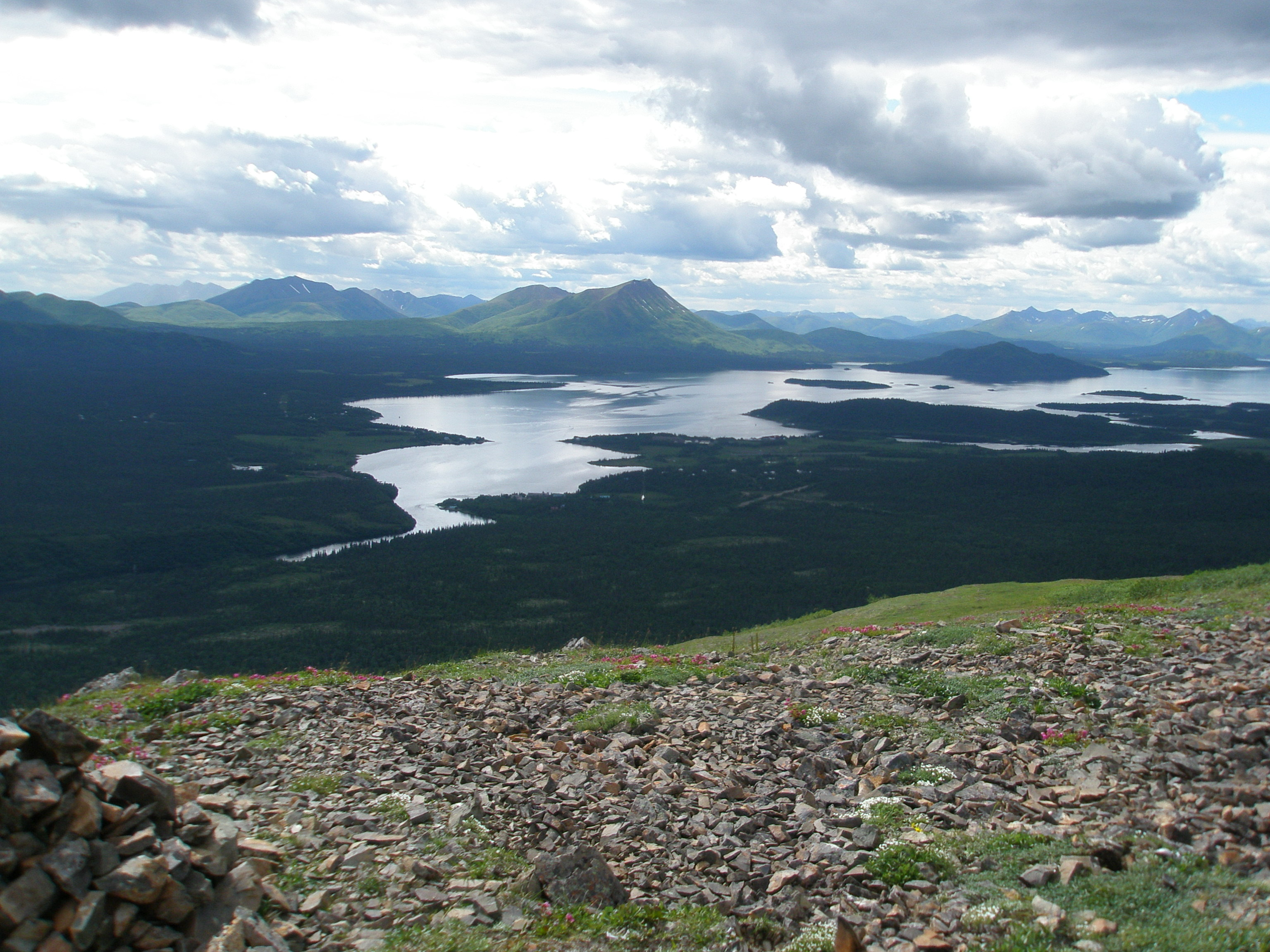

- Location within Alaska Location within North America
- Location: Dillingham Census Area, Alaska, US
- Coordinates: 59°20′22″N 158°48′07″W
- Basin countries: United States
- Max. length: 20 mi (32 km)
- Max. width: 2.5 mi (4 km)
- Settlements: Aleknagik

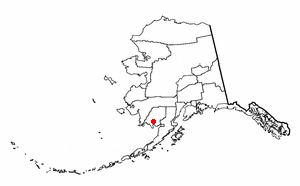
Location of Aleknagik, Alaska

Aleknagik Lake is a lake in the U.S. state of Alaska. It is 20 miles (32 km) long by 2.5 miles (4 km) wide. The village of Aleknagik is on its southeast shore.

Aleknagik is a Yupik word meaning "wrong way home". Yupiks returning to their homes along the Nushagak River would sometimes become lost in the fog and be swept up the Wood River to Aleknagik Lake by the tide.
