= Jack Hickel =

American physician

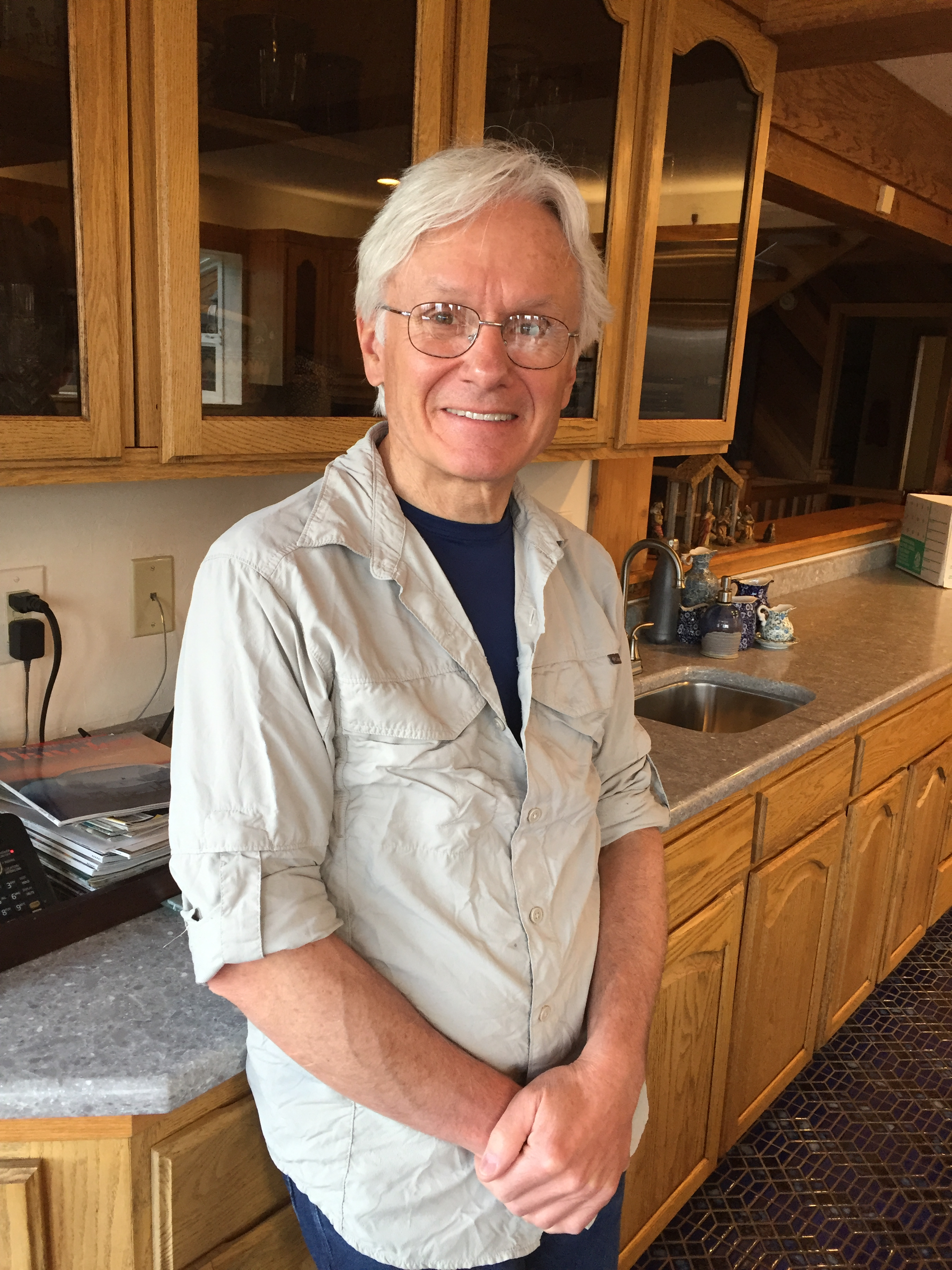
- Born: October 1, 1950 (age 76); Anchorage, AK, U.S.
- Occupation: Physician
- Known for: Permanent Fund Defenders, Alaska Sudan Medical Project

Jack E. Hickel (born October 1, 1950, in Anchorage, Alaska) is an American physician and humanitarian known for his social advocacy and contributions to healthcare. He is the founder of the Alaska Sudan Medical Project (ASMP), which aims to improve the lives of people in Sudan affected by civil war by drilling wells, providing training, promoting agriculture, and providing healthcare.

== Early life and education ==
Hickel was born in Anchorage, Alaska, the fourth of six children (all sons) of Wally Hickel, former United States Secretary of the Interior under President Richard Nixon and two-time governor of Alaska. His mother was Ermalee Hickel, noted Alaska humanitarian. He is married to Josie Hickel, senior vice president of regional development for Chenega Corporation. He is the father of anthropologist Jason Hickel.

He studied at the University of Washington School of Medicine.

== Career ==
Hickel spent 15 years during the 1980s and 1990s as a medical missionary in Swaziland. In 1997, he returned to his home state of Alaska, where he continues to practice as a family physician with the Alaska Native Medical Center.

After a 2007 visit to the village of Old Fangak, Sudan (now South Sudan), Hickel helped found the Alaska Sudan Medical Project (ASMP). Incorporated in 2008, the ASMP drills wells, offers training, promotes agriculture, and provides health care in an area suffering under years of ongoing civil wars. In 2013, the ASMP achieved a primary goal with the construction of a new village clinic.

Hickel is a member of Alaska's Permanent Fund Defenders, a non-partisan and non-profit advocacy group to the defense of the Alaska Permanent Fund, which preserves and shares income from Alaska's natural resources for all residents. Among his advocacy efforts, Hickel has written several editorials in defense of the Permanent Fund and the preservation of the Fund's annual dividend to all Alaskans.
