= Wood River (Nushagak River tributary) =

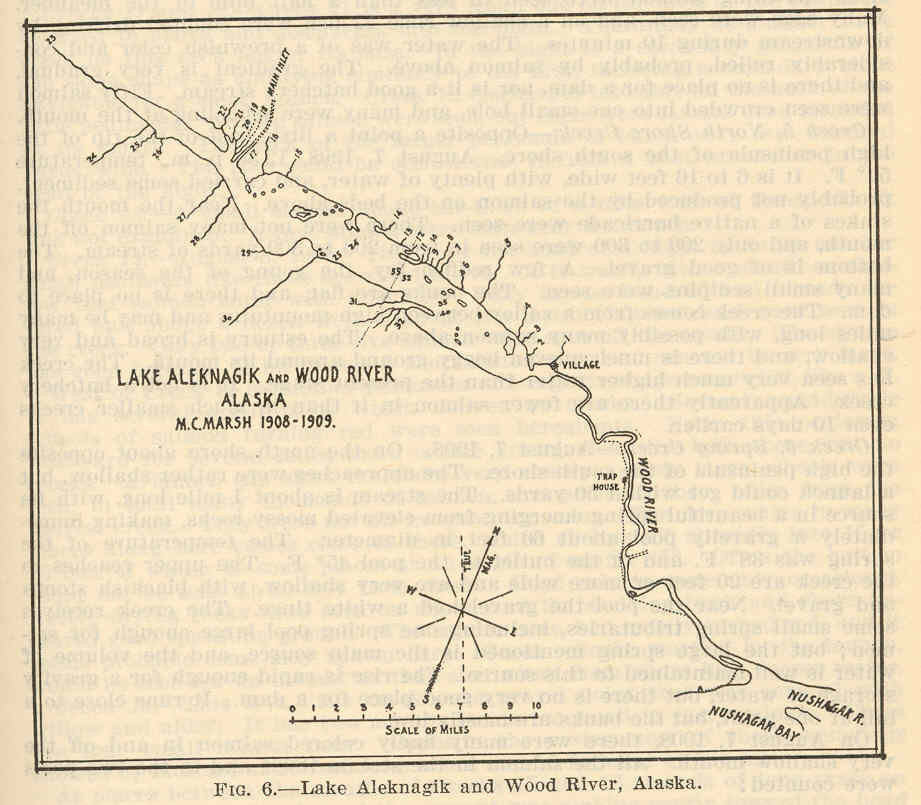
- Wood River

- Location of the mouth of the Wood River in Alaska

Location
- Country: United States
- State: Alaska

Physical characteristics
- Source: Alaska Range
  - location: Aleknagik Lake
  - coordinates: 59°16′27″N 158°35′39″W
- Mouth
  - location: Nushagak River
  - coordinates: 59°03′27″N 158°24′37″W
- Length: 33 km (21 mi)

Wood River is a waterway in Alaska as well as a location outside Dillingham, Alaska by Wood River Road and the Wood River. The Wood River Lakes Trail is used for backcountry float trips. The Wood River Mountains are nearby. Wood River Road is one of the areas transportation routes. The rivers source is the Aleknagik Lake. The river runs past Dillingham where it meets the Nushagak River and enters Nushagak Bay. Nushagak was a former trading post by the area where the rivers met.

Towers used for counting salmon are located in Wood River. Icicle Seafoods is headquartered there and has a salmon processing plant is located along the river in Dilingham.

== Gallery ==
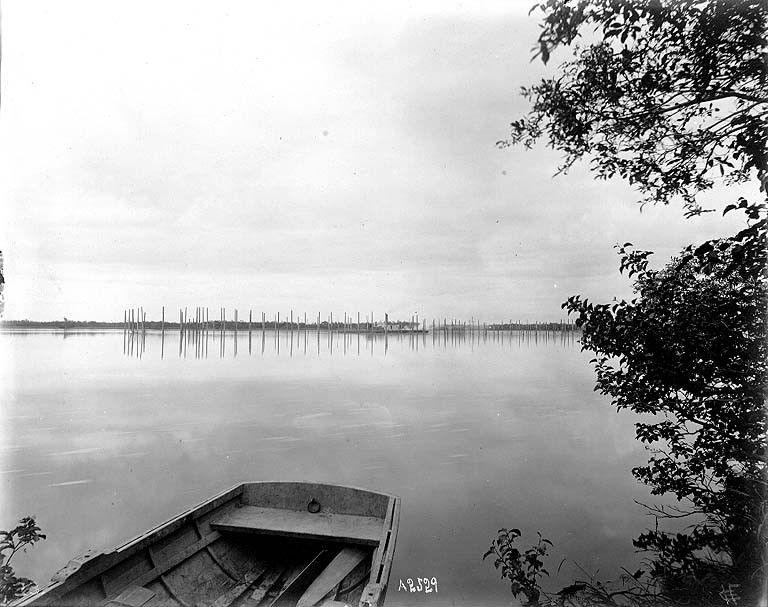
Fish traps belonging to the Alaska Packers Association on Wood River, Bristol Bay

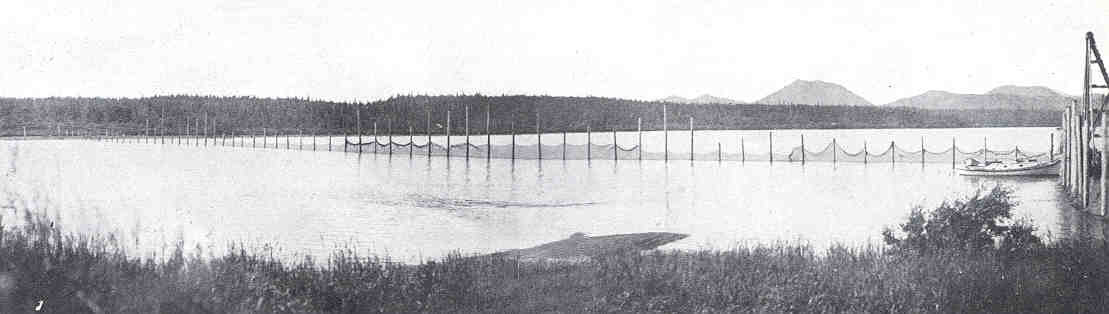
Salmon Rack Across Wood River, Alaska 1917

== See also ==
- List of rivers of Alaska
- Nushagak River
- Wood-Tikchik State Park
