= Rose Dunleavy =

First Lady of Alaska since 2018

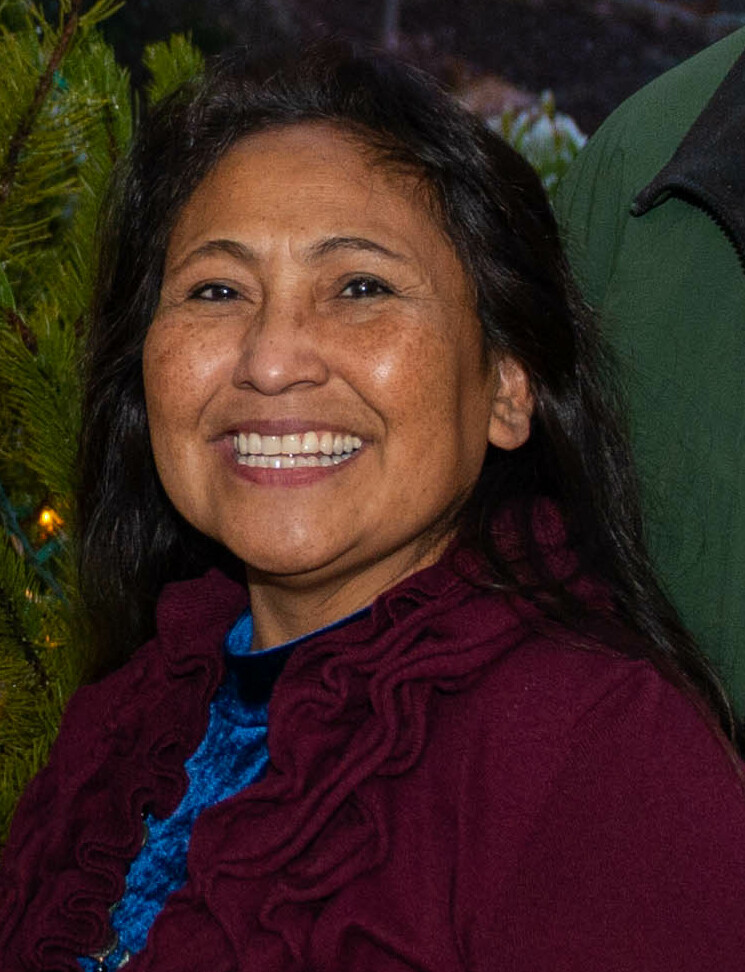
- Dunleavy in 2022

First Lady of Alaska
- Current
- Assumed role December 3, 2018
- Governor: Mike Dunleavy
- Preceded by: Donna Walker

Personal details
- Born: Rose Newlin
- Party: Republican
- Spouse: Mike Dunleavy (m. 1987)
- Children: 3

Rose Dunleavy (née Newlin) is an American Iñupiaq woman who has served as the first lady of Alaska since 2018 as the wife of Governor Mike Dunleavy.

== Early life and family ==
Dunleavy was raised in Noorvik, a village along the Kobuk River Valley in northwest Alaska. She is one of twelve children of Robert and Maggie Newlin. Her father, Robert Newlin Sr., was an Inupiat leader and one of the founders of the regional Native corporation NANA; the school in Noorvik is named in his honor.

== Career ==
Dunleavy began her career in the aviation industry with MarkAir, working in rural Alaska. She later joined Alaska Airlines in Anchorage, where she has worked for more than 20 years.

== First Lady of Alaska (2018–present) ==
Dunleavy became first lady of Alaska in December 2018 when her husband, Mike Dunleavy, was sworn in as governor. The swearing-in ceremony was held in Noorvik, her hometown, marking the first time a U.S. governor took the oath of office above the Arctic Circle.

== Personal life ==
Dunleavy met her husband in Nome, Alaska, and married in 1987. They have three daughters: Maggie, Catherine, and Ceil Anne.

The Dunleavy family lived in Kotzebue, Alaska, for 13 years before eventually settling near Wasilla, where they own 45 acres of land.

The Dunleavy family are active members of their Catholic church in Wasilla.

== See also ==
- First ladies and gentlemen of Alaska
