= Michael Margaret Stewart =

American lawyer

First Lady of Alaska
- In role December 1, 1986 – December 2, 1990
- Governor: Steve Cowper
- Preceded by: Vacant (1982–1986)
- Succeeded by: Ermalee Hickel

Personal details
- Born: December 28, 1952 Paris, France
- Died: October 22, 2015 (aged 62) Santa Barbara, California
- Spouse(s): Justin Hodges (?-?; divorced); Steve Cowper (1985–1991; divorced)
- Children: Wade Cowper (b. 1986)
- Education: Santa Barbara College of Law

Michael Margaret Stewart, formerly Michael Cowper, (December 28, 1952 – October 22, 2015) was an American lawyer and literacy advocate. She served as the sixth First Lady of Alaska during the tenure of her former husband, Alaska Governor Steve Cowper. Stewart established and launched the state reading program, "Look to a Book", as First Lady.

== Biography ==
=== Early life ===
Michael Margaret Stewart was born in Paris, France, on December 28, 1952, to Margaret and Colonel William Stewart. Colonel Stewart, was a U.S. Air Force military attaché to NATO at the time, had married Margaret, who was British, in 1950, two years before her birth. Her parents named her Michael, an unusual first name for a girl, after a family friend, while her middle name came from her mother. Stewart's mother died from breast cancer when she was young.

The Stewart family returned to the United States and settled in Santa Monica, California, where Michael Stewart attended Lincoln Junior High School and Santa Monica High School. Following her father's retirement, the family relocated to Santa Barbara to manage her grandfather's family orchid horticultural business . Stewart would reside in Santa Barbara for the majority of her life. Her father and stepmother later moved to her grandfather's former vacation home in Hope Ranch, California, an upscale suburb of Santa Barbara.

Michael Margaret Stewart graduated from Santa Barbara College of Law when she was 31 years old. Her first marriage, to Justin Hodges, ended in divorce.

=== First Lady of Alaska ===
Stewart met her second husband, Steve Cowper, at a New Year's Eve party at Nipper's Club in Montecito, California, in 1984. Cowper was an Alaskan politician who was preparing for his second gubernatorial campaign, following an unsuccessful bid for Governor of Alaska in 1982. Stewart and Cowper soon married and moved to Alaska.

In 1986, Cowper announced his second candidacy for Governor of Alaska. He defeated incumbent Governor Bill Sheffield in the Democratic primary election on August 26, 1986. Stewart gave birth to the couple's son and only child, Wade Cowper, was born on August 29, 1986, just three days after the primary. The birth of their son attracted widespread public attention during the election campaign. Cowper won the four-way general election in November 1986.

Stewart focused on literacy and rural healthcare during her four years as First Lady of Alaska. The government of Alaska was facing acute economic shortfalls during the Cowper administration, as oil prices fell sharply. Stewart approached private companies and individuals for funding, rather than requesting public tax dollars, for her literacy initiatives. As First Lady, she donated book sets to all 383 elementary schools in Alaska at the time. Stewart launched her signature program, "Look to a Book," in 1989 to promote children's reading and literacy, particular in more remote, rural and Native Alaskan villages in the state. She received a State Reading Association Literacy Award for her work to promote reading. A video produced on behalf of her "Look to a Book" received a national award from the Children’s Television Workshop. She also traveled throughout Alaska on behalf of the Cowper administration's Health Care Commission, which focused on educational accountability and drew-up almost fifty recommendations to alleviate economic and social problems.

By the late 1980s, approximately one-third of Alaska's population was age 18 or younger, posing a demographic challenge. Stewart oversaw the creation of the Commission on Children and Youth to promote child care, as well as the battle against high rates of substance abuse and teen suicide.

Stewart's mother had died from breast cancer. As a preventative measure, Stewart underwent a double mastectomy about halfway through her tenure as First Lady. She went public with her surgery, encouraging discussions on women's health.

Stewart also served as a goodwill ambassador for the state. She accompanied state gubernatorial trade missions to China, Japan, South Korea and Taiwan, as well as the Soviet Union, which had opened business opportunities to Alaska during Perestroika.

=== Law practice and later life ===
In 1989, Governor Cowper announced that he would not seek re-election in the 1990 gubernatorial election. The family moved to Santa Barbara, California, shortly after Cowper left office. Michael Margaret Stewart and Steve Cowper divorced in 1991.

Michael Margaret Stewart continued to practice law in Santa Barbara and raised her son, Wade Cowper, who also became a California lawyer for a nonprofit. Stewart initially worked with colleagues Jackie Misho and Anna Karczag. She then partnered with Marty Cohn, specializing in family law for almost ten years, until a few months before her death in 2015.

In April 2015, Stewart was given a prognosis of three to six months to live due to ovarian cancer. Michael Margaret Stewart died from the disease at Serenity House, a hospice in Santa Barbara on October 22, 2015, at the age of 62. Governor Bill Walker of Alaska ordered that all flags be lowered to half staff in Stewart's honor.
