= Jason Hickel =

Economic anthropologist (born 1982)

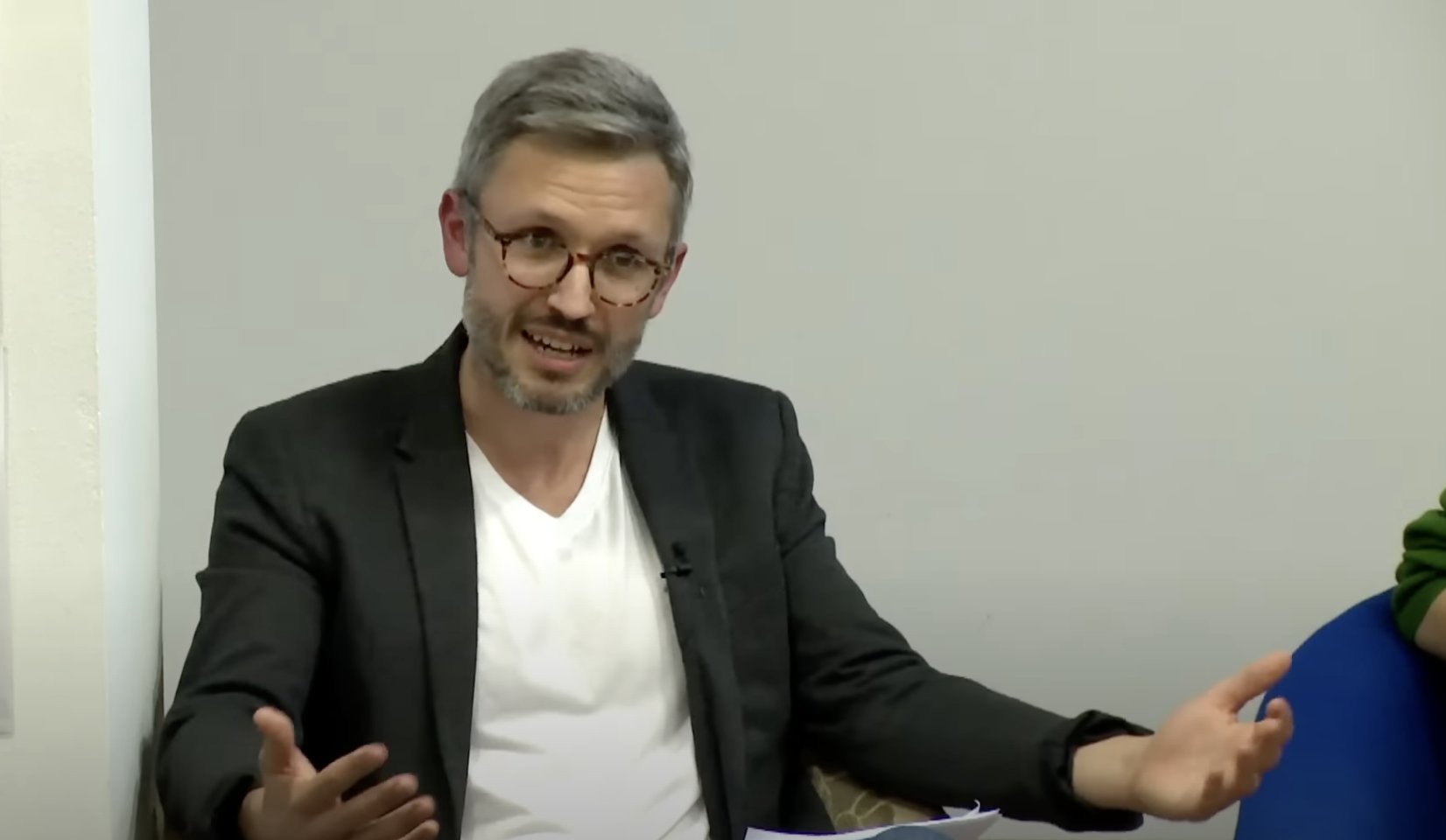
- Hickel in 2022
- Born: 1982 (age 43–44); Eswatini
- Occupations: Academic, author
- Website: jasonhickel.org

Jason Edward Hickel (born 1982) is a Swazi economic anthropologist, academic and democratic eco-socialist. He is a professor at the Institute of Environmental Science & Technology (ICTA-UAB) at the Autonomous University of Barcelona, a Fellow of the Royal Society of Arts, a visiting senior fellow at the International Inequalities Institute at the London School of Economics, and was the Chair of Global Justice and the Environment at the University of Oslo. He serves on the Climate and Macroeconomics Roundtable of the US National Academy of Sciences.

His research focuses on political economy, inequality, and ecological economics. He is a prominent proponent of the degrowth movement and a critic of capitalism, neocolonialism and the use of GDP growth as a measure of progress.

== Background ==
Hickel was born and raised in Swaziland (now Eswatini) where his parents, Jack and Josie Hickel were doctors. He is the grandson of former Alaska Governor Wally Hickel. He holds a bachelor's degree in anthropology from Wheaton College, USA (2004). He received his PhD in anthropology from the University of Virginia in August 2011. His doctoral thesis was entitled Democracy and Sabotage: Moral Order and Political Conflict in KwaZulu-Natal, South Africa. He taught at the London School of Economics from 2011 to 2017, where he held a Leverhulme Early Career Fellowship, and at Goldsmiths, University of London, from 2017 to 2021.

He served on the U.K. Labour Party task force on international development in 2017–2019. As of 2020 he serves on the Harvard-Lancet Commission on Reparations and Redistributive Justice, on the Statistical Advisory Panel for the UN Human Development Report, and on the advisory board for the Green New Deal for Europe.

== Scholarship ==
=== Poverty and development ===
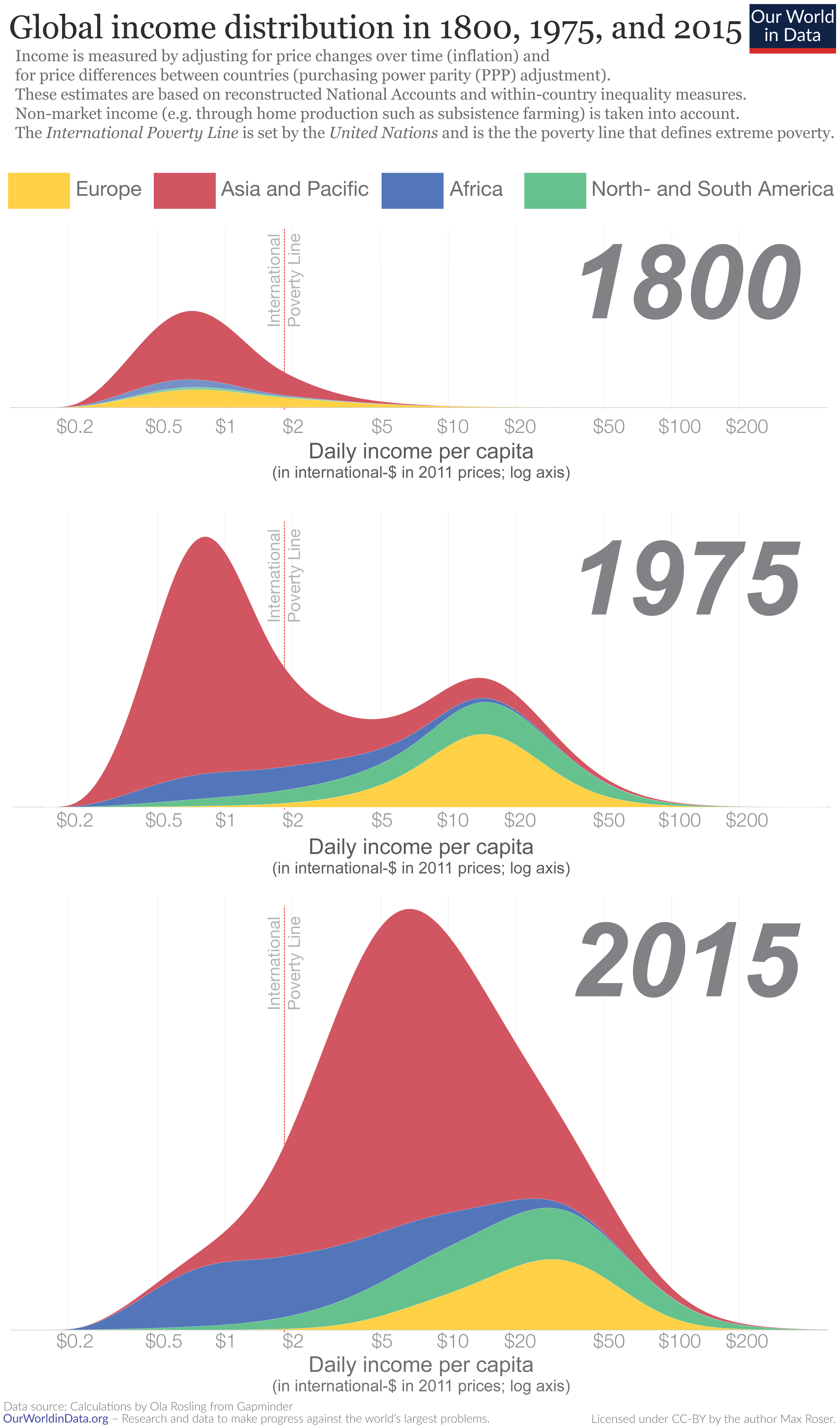
Global income distribution over time (Our World in Data). The chart shows a significant shift of incomes toward higher levels. Critics of Hickel, such as economists Max Roser and Noah Smith, cite this figure as evidence that global poverty has decreased, in contrast to Hickel's narrative.

Hickel, along with co-author Dylan Sullivan, dispute in the journal World Development the view held by most economic historians, that prior to the 19th century, the vast majority of humanity lived in extreme poverty which was eventually ameliorated by industrialization. Hickel argues in The Divide that pre-colonial societies were not poor. He argues that precolonial agricultural societies in Africa and India were "quite content" with a "subsistence lifestyle" and that it was colonialism that made them worse off.. He argues that the dominant narrative of "progress" in international development is overstated, and that poverty remains a widespread and persistent feature of the global economy, reproduced by power imbalances between the Global North and Global South. Hickel argues that the International poverty line used to underwrite the progress narrative, (US$1.90 per day in 2011 PPP, the World Bank's definition of extreme poverty), has no empirical grounding in actual human needs, and is inadequate to achieve basic nutrition and health. Hickel argues that US$7.40 per day is required for nutrition and health. Many other economists agree with Hickel that it would be more useful to use a higher daily income to define the poverty threshold, with some recommending $15 per day. As a consequence of population growth, the absolute number of people living under this threshold has increased from 3.2 billion in 1981 to 4.2 billion in 2015, according to World Bank data. Hickel states that the vast majority of gains against poverty have been achieved by China and East Asian countries that were not subjected to structural adjustment schemes. Elsewhere, increases in income among the poor have been very small, and mostly inadequate to lift people out of his definition of poverty. However, all scholars and intellectuals, including Hickel, agree that the incomes of the poorest people in the world have increased since 1981. Nevertheless, Sullivan and Hickel argue that poverty persists under contemporary global capitalism (in spite of it being highly productive) because masses of working people are cut off from common land and resources, have no ownership or control over the means of production, and have their labor power "appropriated by a ruling class or an external imperial power," thereby maintaining extreme inequality.

In a follow up piece published in Monthly Review, Sullivan and Hickel further argue that this inequality is necessary for capitalism to function as a global system, and as such this explains why it has failed to eliminate extreme poverty outright even though the global economy easily produces enough to do so. Capital accumulation, they posit, requires access to cheap labor, and lots of it, as without it the system would be brought to its knees. They contrast this with the existing communist states, primarily in the 20th century, which "achieved better social outcomes than their capitalist counterparts at any given level of national production, including higher life expectancy, better education attainment, and lower child mortality." In this they quote the economist Amartya Sen who commented on health and literacy achievements around the world that "one thought that is bound to occur is that communism is good for poverty removal."

Noah Smith has criticized Hickel for using a single threshold of poverty ($7.40 per day) and ignoring increases in incomes below that threshold. Smith states that an increase in income from $1.90 per day to $7.39 per day would be life-changing, but would not count as poverty alleviation for Hickel. Smith accuses Hickel that he has continued to treat poverty reduction entirely as a matter of crossing a single finish line. And he continues to set that line high enough to allow him to claim that poverty hasn't fallen. According to Smith it is important to look at distributions, not one threshold. Shaohua Chen and Martin Ravallion's research shows that no matter where the poverty threshold is defined, the percentage of the world's residents who live below it declined from 1981 to 2008.

Professor of Sociology Tibor Rutar assesses Hickel's work in a 2024 paper in which he examines the link between capitalism and extreme poverty. According to Rutar, "the data clearly shows poverty and even life relatively close to extreme poverty (though above it) to be an undeniable and not uncommon reality in many pre-capitalist countries". In contrast to Hickel, Rutar argues that the transition to capitalist institutions in countries such as England did not lead to deterioration, but rather to a stabilization or improvement in living standards. Regions that did not undergo capitalist development yet, such as parts of continental Europe, often experienced a decline in real wages and food security.

=== Colonialism ===
Writing for a piece published in the journal World Development and in an accompanying opinion piece for Al Jazeera, Hickel, along with co-author Dylan Sullivan argue that it was the emergence of colonialism and the shoehorning of regions into the capitalist world system starting in the "long 16th century" that created "periods of severe social and economic dislocation" which resulted in wages crashing to subsistence levels and surging premature mortality. Hickel and Sullivan estimate that British colonial policies in India caused 165 million of excess deaths between 1880 and 1920 (compared to England's 16th and 17th-century average death rate), which they state is "larger than the combined number of deaths that occurred during all famines in the Soviet Union, Maoist China, North Korea, Pol Pot's Cambodia, and Mengistu's Ethiopia". They conclude that human welfare only really began to increase in the 20th century, and note that this development coincided with "the rise of anti-colonial and socialist political movements."

According to sociologist Tibor Rutar, the relationship between capitalism and colonialism is more complex than is often suggested. He argues that many colonial powers (such as Spain and Portugal) in the early modern period were still pre-capitalist. Moreover, he claims that these powers rarely introduced capitalist institutions into their colonies. Only in a few settler colonies, such as the United States and Australia, did a genuine capitalist development take place. According to Rutar, economic profit motives alone are insufficient to classify colonialism as a specifically capitalist practice. Balance of payments analyses also show that colonial plunder generally did not play a necessary or decisive role in Europe's economic growth—except in the case of settler colonies.

=== Trade and global inequality ===
In a 2022 article published in Global Environmental Change, Hickel and a team of scholars state that in the globalized neoliberal capitalist economy, the Global North still relies on "imperialist appropriation" of resources and labor from the Global South, which annually amounts to "12 billion tons of embodied raw material equivalents, 822 million hectares of embodied land, 21 exajoules of embodied energy, and 188 million person-years of embodied labour, worth $10.8 trillion in Northern prices – enough to end extreme poverty 70 times over." From 1990 to 2015, this net appropriation amounted to $242 trillion. Hickel et al. write that this unequal exchange is a leading driver of uneven development, increasing global inequality and environmental degradation.

According to Hickel, the focus on aid as a tool for international development depoliticises poverty and misleads people into believing that rich countries are benevolent toward poorer countries. In reality, he says, financial flows from rich countries to poor countries are outstripped by flows that go in the opposite direction, including external debt service, tax evasion by multinational companies, patent licensing fees and other outflows resulting from structural features of neoliberal globalisation. Moreover, Hickel argues that poor countries suffer significant losses due to international trade and finance rules (such as under structural adjustment programmes, free trade agreements, and the WTO framework) which depress their potential export revenues and prevent them from using protective tariffs, subsidies, and capital controls as tools for national economic development. According to Hickel, global poverty is ultimately an artefact of these structural imbalances. Focusing on aid distracts from the substantive reforms that would be necessary to address these problems.

Journalist Kelsey Piper wrote that Jason Hickel argues most trade between rich and poor countries is extractive rather than mutually beneficial. According to Piper, this view rests on a speculative assumption about how developing countries could grow without trade with rich nations — an assumption that, she noted, is not widely shared by democratically elected leaders in those countries. Piper further argued that the global economy is much more interconnected than Hickel suggests. As an example, she pointed to the COVID-19 pandemic, during which the decline in consumption in wealthy countries led to severe side effects in poorer nations, such as rising hunger and child mortality.

=== Climate change, ecological economics and degrowth ===
In 2020, Hickel published research in The Lancet Planetary Health based on 2015 data. It asserted that a small number of high-income countries are responsible for the overwhelming majority of historical CO_{2} emissions in excess of the planetary boundary (350 ppm). His analysis concluded that the US was responsible for 40%, the EU was responsible for 29%, the most industrialized countries were responsible for 90%, and the Global North as a group was responsible for 92%. He has also argued that high-income nations are disproportionately responsible for other forms of global ecological breakdown, given their high levels of resource use. Critics of Hickel argue that economic growth can occur while emissions decrease, pointing to data that shows that many countries have transitioned to green forms of energy while still experiencing economic growth.

In a review paper written with the ecological economist Giorgos Kallis, Hickel argues that narratives about "green growth" have little empirical validity. They point to evidence showing that it is not feasible for high-income nations to achieve absolute reductions in resource use, or to reduce emissions to zero fast enough stay within the carbon budget for 2 °C if they continue to pursue GDP growth at historical rates. Hickel and his colleagues argue that high-income nations need to scale down excess energy and resource use (i.e., "degrowth") in order to achieve a rapid transition to 100% renewable energy and to reverse ecological breakdown. He has argued that high-income nations do not need economic growth in order to achieve social goals; they can reduce excess resource and energy use while at the same time improving human well-being, by distributing income more fairly, expanding universal public goods, shortening the working week, and introducing a public job guarantee. Hickel has also suggested that modern monetary theory (MMT) could help finance a degrowth transition. In a 2022 comment published in Nature, Hickel, Kallis and others say that both the IPCC and the IPBES "suggest that degrowth policies should be considered in the fight against climate breakdown and biodiversity loss, respectively."

In 2020, Hickel proposed a Sustainable Development Index, which adjusts the Human Development Index by accounting for nations' ecological impact, in terms of per capita emissions and resource use. Hickel has also criticized the Sustainable Development Goals Index (SDG Index)

Human ecologist Rikard Warlenius argues in the scientific journal Ecological Economics that the pessimistic assessment of Hickel regarding decoupling is not based on robust arguments but rather on mystifications of what decoupling entails. They assume a maximum annual reduction in the carbon intensity of GDP of 4%, combined with the notion that global GDP must decline or converge. Based on these assumptions, limiting global warming to 1.5 °C would be impossible, and even the 2 °C target would only be achievable if high-income countries reduced their economies by more than 90%, and middle-income countries by around 70%. However, such a scenario is widely considered politically unrealistic, which could in turn jeopardize the climate targets themselves. According to Warlenius, their pessimism is also unfounded. There are already examples of absolute decoupling where emissions declined faster than the 4% threshold proposed by Hickel. Moreover, he argues that no compelling reasons are given as to why strong policy measures would not be able to achieve higher rates of decoupling. He finds it surprising that scholars such as Hickel and Kallis could not imagine more "aggressive policies" than those used in their model. Under normal conditions, economic growth increases emissions (while carbon intensity declines), and degrowth (recession) stabilizes emissions. At the same time, however, growth is likely better positioned than degrowth to create the conditions necessary for ambitious climate action, such as the deep, transformative, and costly transitions outlined by the IPCC.

Journalist Kelsey Piper argues that Hickel’s vision in Less Is More is based on the assumption that societies can stop pursuing economic growth while better meeting human needs than ever before. She describes this as a “wildly optimistic” idea, disconnected from actual policy results, and even more out of touch with reality than the “sustainable development” models degrowthers themselves criticize. She adds that, in the world today, economic growth is strongly associated with welfare outcomes of every kind. GDP, though imperfect, is the best predictor of well-being indicators such as life expectancy, health care, and leisure time — the very things degrowthers care about. In a similar vein, Max Roser of Our World in Data has stated that economic growth ultimately concerns the production of goods and services that people need. Piper further notes that Less Is More is “surprisingly sparse” in explaining how his vision could achieve its stated goals. She describes Hickel's proposals to shorten the workweek and reform tax policy as solid ideas, but considers the other suggested measures — such as ending planned obsolescence, advertising, food waste, and student debt — “laughably inadequate” to the scale of the climate challenge. According to Piper, Hickel’s work is “relentlessly pessimistic” about the potential for reform within the current system, yet “oddly optimistic” about the feasibility of his own alternative.

Climatologist Michael E. Mann, known for the hockey stick graph, stated that to avert catastrophic warming, global carbon emissions must be cut in half in 10 years. He considered it highly implausible that the world would abandon capitalism or market economics in that time frame, concluding that the climate crisis must therefore be addressed within the framework of the current economic system. Mann and other climate scientists, while recognizing the magnitude of the challenge, strike a more optimistic tone than degrowthers like Hickel. Mann emphasized that the necessary technologies already exist — such as renewable energy, smart grids, and energy storage — and that what is most needed is the political will to deploy them on an unprecedented scale.

== Reception ==
Belgian economist Willem Sas questioned, in an interview with De Morgen, the credibility of degrowth authors such as Jason Hickel, suggesting that some have made the writing of commercial books their main occupation and give media interviews to promote their work. He said that “some degrowthers can explain things very well, which the media appreciate, but it does not seem the ideal source of information". When the interviewer said that Hickel "wants to return to the period before capitalism", Sas said he did not want to return to a time "[w]hen you could still die from a simple cut on your arm".

Senior Fellow of the neoliberal think tank Adam Smith Institute, Tim Worstall, argued that Hickel does not understand economics, adding that Hickel's "economics is wrong because he doesn’t have the base, the footing, in the subject." He also described Hickel as an example of the dangers of pontificating beyond one’s field.

In a review for Deutschlandfunk Kultur, German economics journalist Ursula Weidenfeld described Hickel’s book The Divide as “radically one-sided,” portraying capitalism as a centuries-long history of exploitation. She wrote that it tells a history of capitalism as a powerful conspiracy theory, centering on Hickel’s depiction of industrialization and globalization as instruments of domination that enabled the rich to subjugate the world. According to Weidenfeld, Hickel “denies reports that global poverty has drastically declined in the past twenty years,” calling such claims “sleight-of-hand tricks by interested parties.” She argued that Hickel ignores the disastrously failed attempt at an alternative economic system — communism — and that only for this reason can he recommend a kind of “feel-good socialism” as a remedy, a utopian vision lacking nothing.

== Journalism ==
Hickel writes on global development and political economy, and has contributed to The Guardian, Foreign Policy, Al Jazeera, Jacobin, Monthly Review and other media outlets.

== Awards ==
- Association of Social Anthropologists of the UK and the Commonwealth (ASA) Annual Award for Teaching and Lecturing in Anthropology, 2013.

== Books ==
- de Ploeg, Chris; Hickel, Jason (2026). The Exterminating Empire: Capitalism’s War on Life from Palestine to the Burning Planet. Monthly Review Press. ISBN 978-1685901653.
- Hickel, Jason (2020). Less Is More: How Degrowth Will Save the World. Penguin Random House. ISBN 978-1-78515-249-8.
- Hickel, Jason (2017). The Divide: A Brief Guide to Global Inequality and its Solutions. Random House. ISBN 978-1-4735-3927-3.
  - (2018). The Divide: Global Inequality from Conquest to Free Markets. WWNorton. ISBN 978-0-393-65136-2
- Hickel, Jason; Haynes, Naomi (2018). Hierarchy and Value: Comparative Perspectives on Moral Order. Berghahn Books. ISBN 978-1-78533-998-1.
- Hickel, Jason (2016). "Neoliberalism and the End of Democracy". In Springer, Simon; Birch, Kean; MacLeavy, Julie (eds.). The Handbook of Neoliberalism. Routledge. ISBN 978-1-138-84400-1.
- Hickel, Jason (2015). Democracy as Death: The Moral Order of Anti-Liberal Politics in South Africa. University of California Press. ISBN 978-0-520-95986-6.
- Healy-Clancy, Meghan; Hickel, Jason (2014). Ekhaya: The Politics of Home in KwaZulu-Natal. University of KwaZulu-Natal Press. ISBN 978-1-86914-254-4.
