= Robert Krimmer =

American lawyer and former actor (born 1953)

- Born: Robert Krimmer; November 24, 1953 (age 72); Chicago, Illinois
- Other name: Wortham Krimmer
- Education: American Conservatory Theater (MFA); Santa Barbara & Ventura Colleges of Law
- Occupations: Lawyer, actor (former)
- Known for: Martin Zeiss in The Paper Chase
- Spouse: Christine LaValle (2009-present)
- Children: 2

Robert Krimmer (born November 24, 1953) is an American lawyer and former actor. Formerly known professionally as Wortham Krimmer (his first wife's maiden name as his first name), Krimmer has reverted to his birth name of Robert Krimmer.

With appearances on St. Elsewhere, Hill Street Blues, and the soap operas, Knots Landing and Days of Our Lives, Krimmer is best known by soap fans as Reverend Andrew Carpenter on the ABC soap opera One Life to Live. He is also known for playing the mad Emperor Cartagia in the 4th season of the science fiction series Babylon 5. In addition, he was featured on the Showtime drama The Paper Chase for the second, third and final seasons as Zeiss, a student and member of the Law Review, and on Family Medical Center (1988–1989) as Dr. Alexander Raines.

Prior to his acting career, Krimmer attended the JD/MBA program at University of California Hastings College of Law and Berkeley. He left the program upon being offered a scholarship to the American Conservatory Theater (ACT) MFA Program. After completing the three-year program at ACT, Krimmer pursued an acting career that spanned 27 years. Following his acting career Krimmer returned to law school, attending classes at Santa Barbara & Ventura Colleges of Law on a part-time basis while working as a paralegal during the day. He graduated valedictorian and then passed the California bar exam on his first try. Following law school he began work as an attorney.

Krimmer has been married to Chris LaValle since 2009 and has two children from a previous marriage.
