= First ladies and gentlemen of Alaska =

Title of the spouse of the governor of Alaska

First Lady of Alaska
- Seal of Alaska

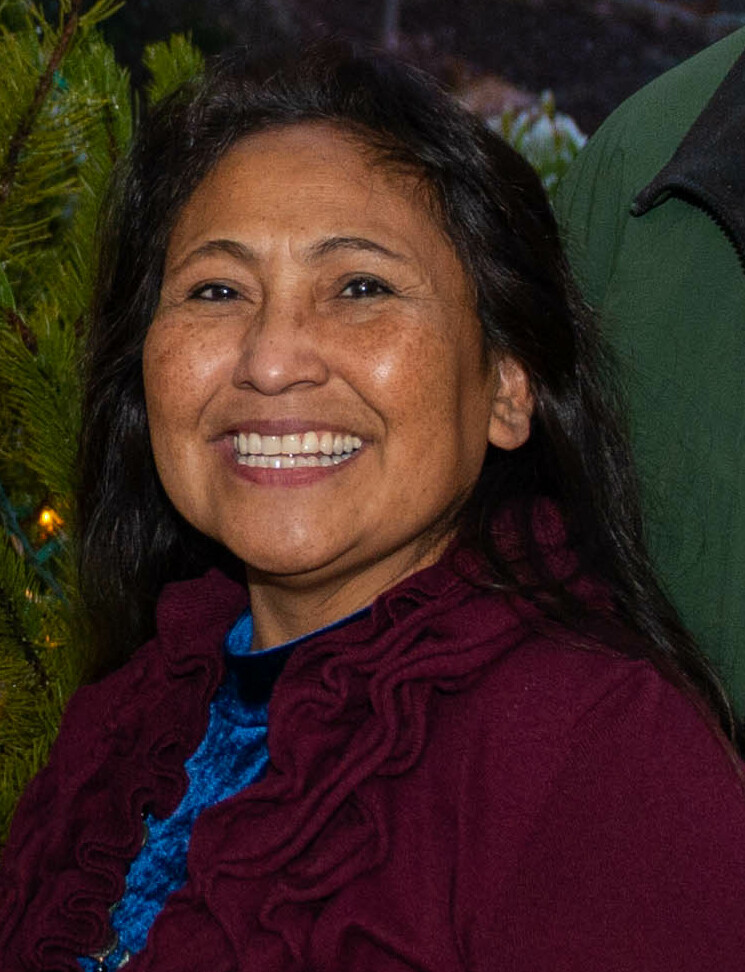
- Current; Rose Dunleavy since December 3, 2018
- Style: Mrs. Dunleavy; Madam First Lady
- Residence: Governor's Mansion
- Inaugural holder: Neva Egan (as first lady); Todd Palin (as first gentleman)
- Formation: January 3, 1959 (67 years ago)
- Website: Official website

First Lady or First Gentleman of Alaska is the title attributed to the wife or husband of the governor of Alaska. The holder of the title resides with the governor at the Alaska Governor's Mansion in Juneau, Alaska.

The current first lady of Alaska is Rose Dunleavy, wife of Governor Mike Dunleavy, who has held the position since December 3, 2018. To date, only one person has served as the first gentleman since statehood: Todd Palin from 2006 to 2009.

== List of first ladies and gentlemen of Alaska ==
First Lady/Gentleman	Term begins	Term ends	Governor	Notes
Neva Egan	January 3, 1959	December 5, 1966	William Egan	
Ermalee Hickel	December 5, 1966	January 29, 1969	Wally Hickel	
Diana Miller	January 29, 1969	December 7, 1970	Keith Harvey Miller	
Neva Egan	December 7, 1970	December 2, 1974	William Egan	Second tenure as First Lady
Bella Hammond	December 2, 1974	December 6, 1982	Jay Hammond	
Position vacant	December 6, 1982	December 1, 1986	Bill Sheffield	Sheffield's wife, Lee Sheffield, died in 1978.
Michael Margaret Stewart	December 1, 1986	December 3, 1990	Steve Cowper	
Ermalee Hickel	December 3, 1990	December 5, 1994	Wally Hickel	Second tenure as First Lady
Susan Knowles	December 5, 1994	December 2, 2002	Tony Knowles	
Nancy Murkowski	December 2, 2002	December 4, 2006	Frank Murkowski	
Todd Palin	December 4, 2006	July 26, 2009	Sarah Palin	The first man to serve as First Gentleman. Often nicknamed "First Dude of Alaska."
Sandra Parnell	July 26, 2009	December 1, 2014	Sean Parnell	
Donna Walker	December 1, 2014	December 3, 2018	Bill Walker	
Rose Dunleavy	December 3, 2018	present	Mike Dunleavy	
