= Aleknagik, Alaska =

City in Alaska, United States

Aleknagik Alaqnaqiq
- City
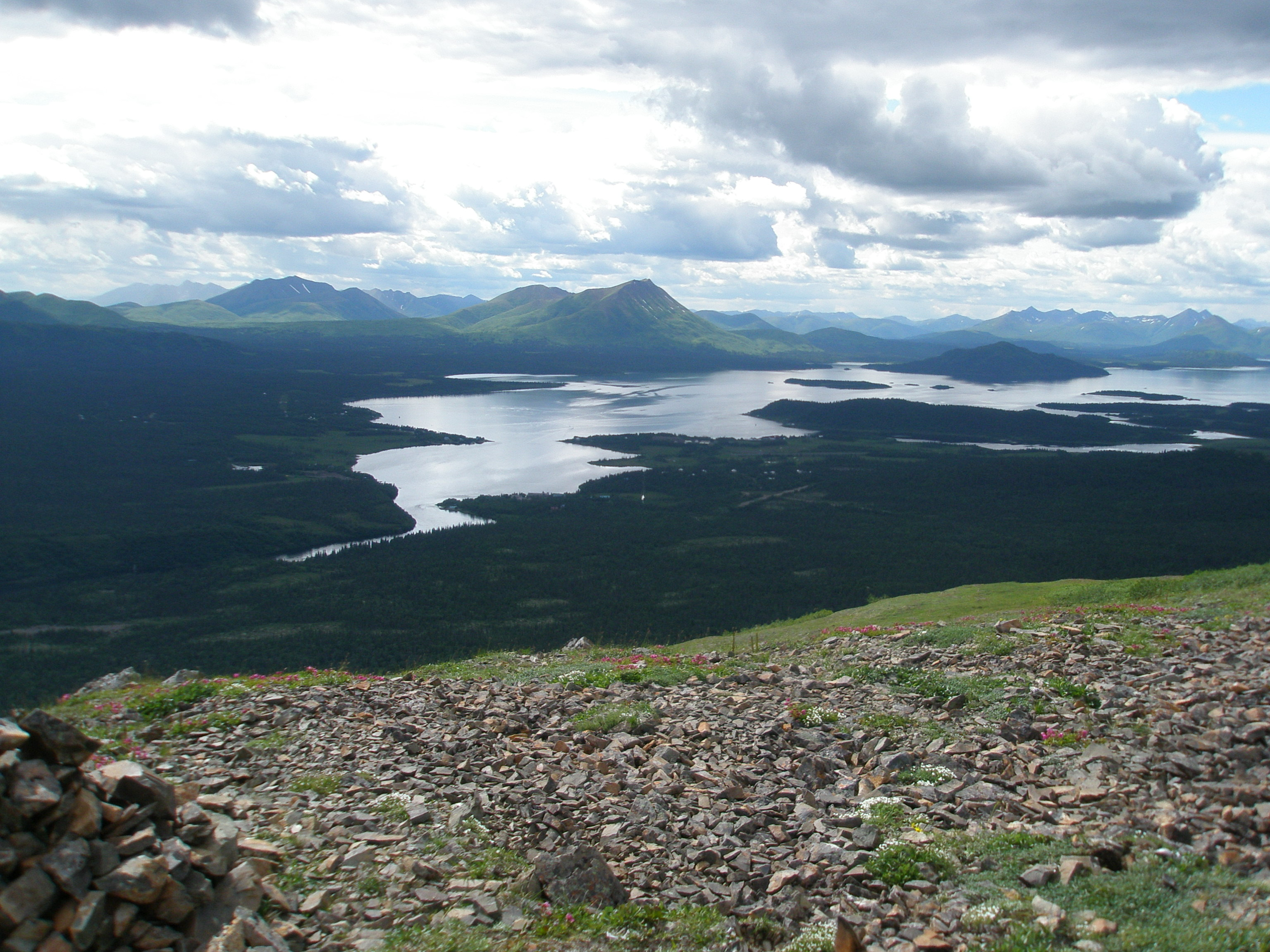
- Aleknagik lake, with the village of Aleknagik apparent in the lower left of the picture

- Location in Alaska
- Coordinates: 59°16′42″N 158°37′23″W
- Country: United States
- State: Alaska
- Census Area: Dillingham
- Incorporated: March 26, 1973

Government
  - Mayor: Mr Kelly Ilutsik
  - State senator: Lyman Hoffman (D)
  - State rep.: Bryce Edgmon (I)

Area
  - Total: 43.52 sq mi (112.71 km^{2})
  - Land: 26.55 sq mi (68.76 km^{2})
  - Water: 16.97 sq mi (43.95 km^{2})
- Elevation: 36 ft (11 m)

Population (2020)
  - Total: 211
  - Density: 8.0/sq mi (3.07/km^{2})
- Time zone: UTC-9 (Alaska (AKST))
  - Summer (DST): UTC-8 (AKDT)
- ZIP code: 99555
- Area code: 907
- FIPS code: 02-01420
- GNIS feature ID: 1398091
- Website: aleknagikak.gov

Aleknagik (/əˈlɛknəɡɪk/ ə-LEK-nə-gik; Central Yupik: Alaqnaqiq) is a second class city in the Dillingham Census Area of the Unorganized Borough of the U.S. state of Alaska. The population was 211 at the 2020 census.

== Geography ==
Aleknagik is located at 59°16′42″N 158°37′23″W (59.278362, -158.622928) (Sec. 31, T010S, R055W, Seward Meridian), in the Bristol Bay Recording District.

Aleknagik is located at the head of the Wood River on the southeast end of Lake Aleknagik, 16 miles (26 km) northwest of Dillingham. The city is named after Aleknagik Lake.

According to the United States Census Bureau, the city has a total area of 41.5 square miles (107.5 km^{2}), of which 24.5 square miles (63.5 km^{2}) is land and 17.0 square miles (44.0 km^{2}), or 40.89%, is water.

== Climate ==
Aleknagik's climate is similar to that of nearby Anchorage and Dillingham, having a typical subarctic climate (Köppen climate classification: Dfc). Fog and low clouds are common during July and August, and may preclude access. The lake and river are ice-free from June through mid-November. A weather station was operated between 1958 and 1973; however the climate data has many missing observations and appears slightly irregular, with March in many years being colder than February. The smoothed data, however, shows March slightly warmer:

Climate data for Aleknagik
Month	Jan	Feb	Mar	Apr	May	Jun	Jul	Aug	Sep	Oct	Nov	Dec	Year
Record high °F (°C)	49 (9)	45 (7)	52 (11)	53 (12)	71 (22)	88 (31)	88 (31)	78 (26)	70 (21)	61 (16)	47 (8)	45 (7)	88 (31)
Mean daily maximum °F (°C)	20.6 (−6.3)	27.9 (−2.3)	27.5 (−2.5)	37.0 (2.8)	50.1 (10.1)	61.2 (16.2)	66.0 (18.9)	63.0 (17.2)	56.8 (13.8)	41.2 (5.1)	29.3 (−1.5)	21.7 (−5.7)	41.9 (5.5)
Daily mean °F (°C)	12.4 (−10.9)	18.9 (−7.3)	16.6 (−8.6)	28.7 (−1.8)	41.1 (5.1)	50.9 (10.5)	56.1 (13.4)	53.1 (11.7)	48.2 (9.0)	33.5 (0.8)	22.2 (−5.4)	14.2 (−9.9)	33.0 (0.5)
Mean daily minimum °F (°C)	4.1 (−15.5)	9.8 (−12.3)	5.7 (−14.6)	20.3 (−6.5)	32.0 (0.0)	40.6 (4.8)	46.1 (7.8)	43.2 (6.2)	39.5 (4.2)	25.7 (−3.5)	15.0 (−9.4)	6.6 (−14.1)	24.1 (−4.4)
Record low °F (°C)	−44 (−42)	−35 (−37)	−36 (−38)	−15 (−26)	11 (−12)	23 (−5)	31 (−1)	28 (−2)	22 (−6)	−4 (−20)	−20 (−29)	−27 (−33)	−44 (−42)
Average precipitation inches (mm)	1.84 (47)	2.06 (52)	2.41 (61)	2.98 (76)	3.12 (79)	2.87 (73)	2.77 (70)	5.14 (131)	4.81 (122)	2.82 (72)	2.55 (65)	2.79 (71)	36.16 (919)
Average snowfall inches (cm)	10.4 (26)	14.9 (38)	12.5 (32)	7.8 (20)	1.3 (3.3)	0.0 (0.0)	0.0 (0.0)	0.0 (0.0)	0.0 (0.0)	2.3 (5.8)	9.2 (23)	8.4 (21)	66.9 (170)

== History and culture ==
Wood River and Aleknagik Lake have been used historically as summer fish camps. The spelling of the Yupik word "Aleknagik" has been disputed, because Yupik was an unwritten language. The name was described by the resident Yako family in 1930 as meaning "Wrong Way Home", because Nushagak River residents returning to their homes upriver would sometimes become lost in the fog and find themselves swept up the Wood River with the tide, inadvertently arriving at Aleknagik Lake.

Recorded history may not define the exact place of Aleknagik, and various reports have reported the original site with the name "Alaqnaqiq" as far to the south near entrance to the Wood River. James Van Stone, an anthropologist who traveled to Saint Petersburg and read diaries of the Russian explorers from 1867, noted that explorers traveled to "Aleknagik Lake" (in a spelling that is Russian but sounds out to Aleknagik).

In 2005, the Alaska Department of Natural Resources applied to own the waterways and compiled an extensive history of the area in their application (see Links below).

The 1929 U.S. Census found 55 people living in the "Wood River village" area to the south. During 1930, there were five families living on the shores of the lake year-round, the Waskeys, Polleys, Hansons, Yakos, and Smiths. A log cabin territorial school was built on the south shore of the lake in 1933, and Josie Waskey was the first teacher. Attracted by the school, other facilities, and plentiful fish, game and timber, a number of families from the Goodnews, Togiak, and Kulukak areas relocated to Aleknagik. A post office was established in March 1937, with Mrs Mabel M. Smith as postmaster. A two-story framed school with a teacher apartment was constructed in 1938. By 1939, Aleknagik had 78 residents, over 30 buildings, and a small sawmill. In the late 1940s, a Seventh-day Adventist mission and school were established on the north shore. During the 1950s, a Moravian church and a Russian Orthodox church were built in Aleknagik, and over 35 families lived along the lake. In 1959, the state constructed a 25-mile (40 km) road connecting the south shore to Dillingham. The road was passable only during the summer months, until the late 1980s when it was upgraded and maintained year-round. The city was incorporated in 1973. Over 24 additional square miles were annexed to the city in April 2000.

In the mid-1950s, Moravian church members formed a colony on the north shore of the lake, across from the post office. The Moravian pastor and his wife's family built homes there and remain in the community.

In the late 19th century there were about 200 people in Aleknagik and the other Wood River villages. Varied illnesses killed most of the residents of the villages. The few survivors moved out of the area. In fall of 1930, there was one Yupik family living at the top of the Wood River in Aleknagik, and the village grew to about 40 people by 1931. By 1940, Aleknagik had over 30 buildings, including a community school, church, and small sawmill. The local religious mission school, run by Seventh-day Adventists, brought several new families to Aleknagik. Other families came to the village because of the territorial school.

In 1938, a territorial school was constructed in Aleknagik. During this period, a Moravian church, a Russian Orthodox church and a Seventh-day Adventist mission school were established in the community. In 1959, the State of Alaska constructed a 22-mile (35 km) road connecting Aleknagik to Dillingham.

The Aleknagik Traditional Council, a federally-recognized tribe, is located in the community.

In August 2010, an airplane carrying former Senator Ted Stevens crashed near Alegnagik, resulting in the death of Stevens and four others.

== Demographics ==
Historical population
Census	Pop.	Note	%±
1940	78		—
1950	153		96.2%
1960	181		18.3%
1970	128		−29.3%
1980	154		20.3%
1990	185		20.1%
2000	221		19.5%
2010	219		−0.9%
2020	211		−3.7%
U.S. Decennial Census

Aleknagik first appeared on 1940 U.S. Census as an unincorporated village. It appeared as Aleknagik Lake (uninc.) on the 1960 census, and neighboring village of Aleknagik Mission showed 50 residents (for a combined total area of 231). In 1970, it appeared again simply as Aleknagik and was incorporated in 1973.

=== 2020 census ===
As of the 2020 census, Aleknagik had a population of 211. The median age was 36.8 years. 24.6% of residents were under the age of 18 and 18.5% of residents were 65 years of age or older. For every 100 females there were 124.5 males, and for every 100 females age 18 and over there were 127.1 males age 18 and over.

0.0% of residents lived in urban areas, while 100.0% lived in rural areas.

There were 72 households in Aleknagik, of which 34.7% had children under the age of 18 living in them. Of all households, 30.6% were married-couple households, 34.7% were households with a male householder and no spouse or partner present, and 20.8% were households with a female householder and no spouse or partner present. About 26.3% of all households were made up of individuals and 9.7% had someone living alone who was 65 years of age or older.

There were 116 housing units, of which 37.9% were vacant. The homeowner vacancy rate was 1.5% and the rental vacancy rate was 8.3%.

Racial composition as of the 2020 census
Race	Number	Percent
White	40	19.0%
Black or African American	0	0.0%
American Indian and Alaska Native	132	62.6%
Asian	2	0.9%
Native Hawaiian and Other Pacific Islander	0	0.0%
Some other race	0	0.0%
Two or more races	37	17.5%
Hispanic or Latino (of any race)	4	1.9%

=== 2000 census ===
As of the census of 2000, there were 221 people, 70 households, and 52 families residing in the city. The population density was 19.1 people per square mile (7.4 people/km^{2}). There were 107 housing units at an average density of 9.3 units per square mile (3.6 units/km^{2}). The racial makeup of the city was 13.57% White, 81.90% Native American, 1.36% from other races, and 3.17% from two or more races. 1.36% of the population were Hispanic or Latino of any race.

There were 70 households, out of which 41.4% had children under the age of 18 living with them, 48.6% were married couples living together, 11.4% had a female householder with no husband present, and 24.3% were non-families. 17.1% of all households were made up of individuals, and 2.9% had someone living alone who was 65 years of age or older. The average household size was 3.16 and the average family size was 3.62.

In the city, the age distribution of the population shows 37.1% under the age of 18, 9.0% from 18 to 24, 29.9% from 25 to 44, 16.3% from 45 to 64, and 7.7% who were 65 years of age or older. The median age was 28 years. For every 100 females, there were 121.0 males. For every 100 females age 18 and over, there were 131.7 males.

The median income for a household in the city was $22,750, and the median income for a family was $30,625. Males had a median income of $29,583 versus $75,487 for females. The per capita income for the city was $10,973. About 21.7% of families and 40.8% of the population were below the poverty line, including 49.0% of those under the age of eighteen and 21.4% of those 65 or over.

== Public services ==
The majority of residents (49 homes) have household plumbing, and most use individual wells. 12 homes do not have water or sewer service – some haul water from the community center, and a few are served by a spring water catchment system. Septic tanks, leachate fields and public sewage lagoons are used for sewage disposal. The North Shore uses eleven shared residential effluent pumps (REP units) which discharge into a piped system. There are three landfill sites. The North Shore landfill is being relocated; the South Shore landfill has an incinerator but is unfenced. A third landfill is located 2 miles (3.2 km) from the South Shore, on the West side of the Aleknagik-Dillingham road. Electricity is provided by Nushugak Electric Cooperative. Local hospitals or health clinics include North Shore Health Clinic (842–5512), South Shore Health Clinic (842–2185) or Kanakanak Hospital in Dillingham. Both, North and South Shore Clinics are Primary Health Care facilities. Aleknagik is classified as a highway village, it is found in EMS Region 2I in the Bristol Bay Region. Emergency Services have limited highway, air and satellite access. Emergency service is provided by volunteers and a health aide Auxiliary health care is provided by Aleknagik First Responders Group (907-842-2085); or Kanakanak Hospital in Dillingham (25 road miles).

There is one school located in the community, Aleknagik School, operated by the Southwest Region School District. It is attended by 26 students.

In 2021, Aleknagik became a part of the Energy Transitions Initiative Partnership Project via the Renewable Energy Alaska Project; the project will help the city (and several other remote villages in Alaska) develop renewable energy sources and increase its energy efficiency.

== Economy and transportation ==
Many residents participate in commercial and subsistence activities on the Bristol Bay coast during the summer. 33 residents hold commercial fishing permits. Trapping is also an important means of income. Most families depend to some extent on subsistence activities to supplement their livelihoods. Salmon, freshwater fish, moose, caribou, and berries are harvested. Poor fish returns and prices since 1997 have significantly affected the community.

Aleknagik is the only village in the region coming close to a road link with Dillingham; a 25-mile (40 km) road connects to the south shore of Aleknagik Lake from which the city is within walking distance. The "New Aleknagik" airport is a State-owned 2,070-foot-long (630 m) by 90-foot-wide (27 m) gravel airstrip located on the north shore, and regular flights are scheduled through Dillingham. The north shore of the lake was not road accessible until fall of 2016 when finally a two lane 440' bridge was constructed across the Wood River; residents used skiffs to travel to town on the south shore. Moody's Aleknagik Seaplane Base, also on the north shore, accommodates float planes. There are two additional airstrips, the public Tripod Airport, a 1,250-foot (380 m) turf-gravel airstrip located 2 miles (3 km) southeast of Aleknagik, and the Adventist Mission School Airport, a 1,200-foot (370 m) gravel/dirt airstrip with a crosswind runway. The State owns and operates a 100-foot (30 m) dock on the north shore of Aleknagik Lake. A breakwater, barge landing, boat launch ramp and boat lift are available on the north shore. Vehicles, skiffs, ATVs and snowmachines are the most frequent means of local transportation.

Sales tax in the community is 5%, and there is also a 5% accommodations tax. There is no property tax.

== Notable Resident ==
- Callan Chythlook-Sifsof (born 1989), Olympic snowboarder
