= Neva Egan =

American educator (1914–2011)

First Lady of Alaska
- In role January 3, 1959 – December 5, 1966
- Governor: William Allen Egan
- Preceded by: Marion Hendrickson (as wife of the acting territorial governor)
- Succeeded by: Ermalee Hickel
- In role December 7, 1970 – December 2, 1974
- Governor: William Allen Egan
- Preceded by: Diana Miller
- Succeeded by: Bella Hammond

Personal details
- Born: Desdia Neva McKittrick; October 3, 1914 Wilson, Kansas, U.S.
- Died: January 19, 2011 (aged 96) Juneau, Alaska, U.S.
- Party: Democratic
- Spouse: William Allen Egan
- Children: Elin Carol Egan (b. and d. ca. 1941); Dennis William Egan (b. 1947, d. 2022)

Desdia Neva Egan (October 3, 1914 – January 19, 2011) was an American educator who served as the first First Lady of Alaska from the state's creation in 1959 to 1966, and again from 1970 to 1974. Egan was the wife of the state of Alaska's first governor, William Allen Egan, and the mother of former Juneau Mayor and Alaska State Senator Dennis Egan.

== Biography ==
=== Early life ===
Egan was born Desdia Neva McKittrick on October 3, 1914, in Wilson, Kansas. She was the third of five children born to Joseph Leland McKittrick and Martha Desdia Alderson McKittrick. McKittrick worked at her family's grocery store to earn the tuition money to attend Kansas State College. She then transferred to the University of Wyoming, where her aunt was a faculty member, in Laramie, Wyoming.

McKittrick began her career teaching music in a public school in Glenrock, Wyoming, for two years. She was paid a salary of $1,000 USD annually. She moved to the Territory of Alaska from Wyoming in 1937. McKittrick sailed to Alaska on board a steamship called the Teachers Special, which brought teachers to Alaska to work in the territory during the winter. McKittrick moved to Valdez, Alaska, where she became one of just three new teachers hired for the Valdez school district that year for a one-year teaching assignment. She taught fourth through sixth grade, as well as music, in the Valdez public school system.

McKittrick soon met her future husband, William Allen Egan, in Valdez, and the couple married on November 16, 1940. William Egan was also elected to the Alaska Territorial House of Representatives in 1940. William and Neva also operated a small grocery store, the Valdez Supply.
