= Aleknagik Airport =

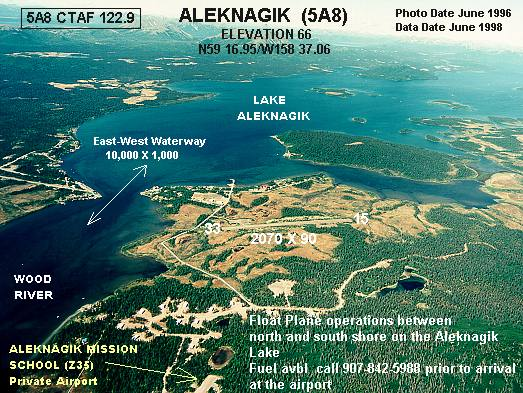
- IATA: WKK; ICAO: none; FAA LID: 5A8

Summary
- Airport type: Public
- Owner: State of Alaska DOT&PF - Central Region
- Serves: Aleknagik, Alaska
- Elevation AMSL: 66 ft (20 m)
- Coordinates: 59°16′57″N 158°37′04″W

Map
- Location of airport in Alaska

Runways
Direction	Length		Surface
Direction	ft	m	Surface
15/33	2,030	619	Gravel

Statistics (2015)
- Aircraft operations: 930 (2013)
- Based aircraft: 0
- Passengers: 36
- Freight: 54,000 lbs
- Source: Federal Aviation Administration

Aleknagik Airport (IATA: WKK, FAA LID: 5A8), also known as Aleknagik (New) Airport, is a state-owned, public-use airport located one nautical mile (1.85 km) east of the central business district of Aleknagik, a city in the Dillingham Census Area of the U.S. state of Alaska.

This airport is included in the FAA's National Plan of Integrated Airport Systems for 2009–2013, which categorizes it as a general aviation facility. The airport formerly had scheduled service provided by PenAir with flights to Dillingham.

It has a single runway and an FAA location identifier of 5A8, while Aleknagik Seaplane Base uses an FAA identifier of Z33.

== Facilities and aircraft ==
Aleknagik Airport covers an area of 51 acres (21 ha) at an elevation of 66 feet (20 m) above mean sea level. It has one runway designated 15/33 with a gravel and dirt surface measuring 2,040 by 80 feet (622 x 24 m). For the 12-month period ending December 31, 2008, the airport had 2,500 aircraft operations, an average of 208 per month: 60% air taxi and 40% general aviation.

== Airlines and destinations ==
=== Statistics ===
Carrier shares: January – December 2015
Carrier	Passengers (arriving and departing)
Grant	40(100.00%)

Top domestic destinations: January – December 2015
Rank	City	Airport	Passengers
1	Manokotak, AK	Manokotak Airport (KMO)	6
2	Dillingham, AK	Dillingham Airport (DLG)	4

== See also ==
- List of airports in Alaska
