= Joe Thomas (Alaska politician) =

American politician

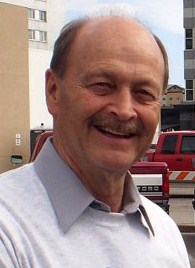

Member of the Alaska Senate from the D district
- In office January 16, 2007 – January 15, 2013
- Preceded by: Ralph Seekins
- Succeeded by: redistricting

Personal details
- Born: October 17, 1948 (age 77) Fairbanks, Alaska
- Party: Democratic
- Spouse: N/A
- Education: West Virginia University
- Profession: Labor Union official

Joseph James Thomas, Jr., more commonly known as Joe J. Thomas, is a former Democratic member of the Alaska Senate, representing the D District from 2006 through 2012. He was previously an official with the Laborers' Union Local 942.

On November 6, 2012, Thomas lost his general election bid to John Coghill.
