= Alaska Governor's Mansion =

Historic house in Alaska, United States

- U.S. National Register of Historic Places
- Alaska Heritage Resources Survey
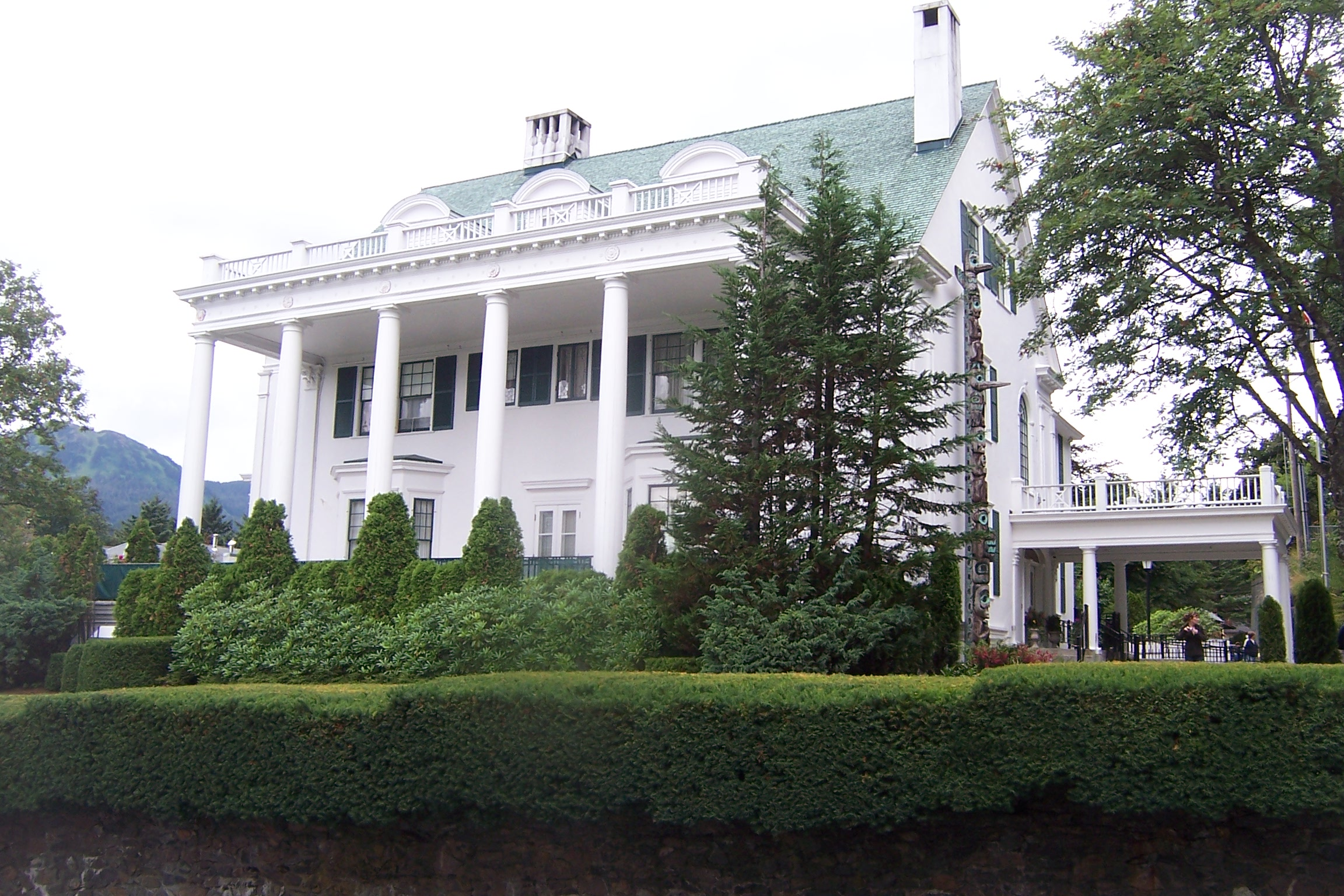
- The Alaska Governor's Mansion, 2009

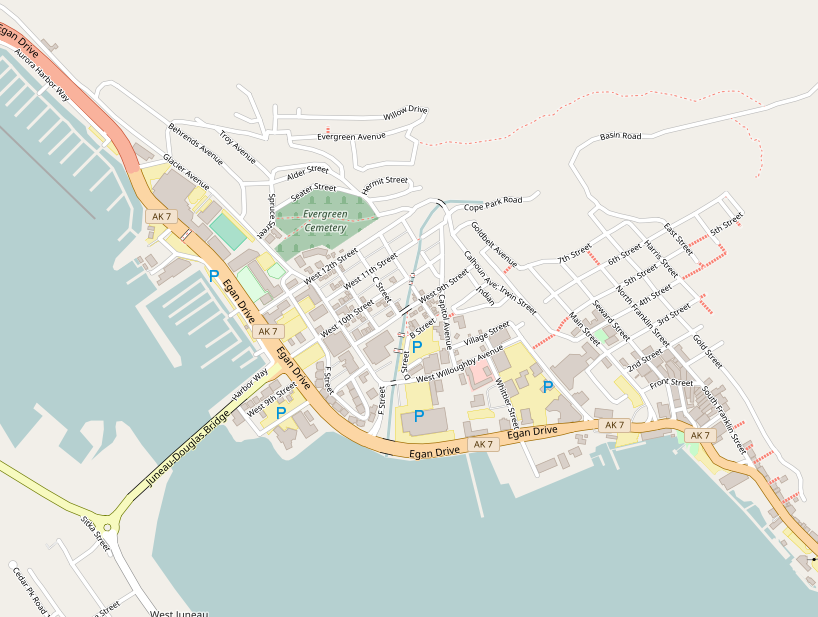
- Location within Juneau Location within Alaska
- Location: 716 Calhoun Avenue, Juneau, Alaska
- Coordinates: 58.30272°N 134.4149°W
- Area: Less than one acre
- Built: 1912
- Built by: William N. Collier
- Architect: James Knox Taylor
- NRHP reference No.: 76000359
- AHRS No.: JUN-019

Significant dates
- Added to NRHP: November 7, 1976
- Designated AHRS: July 9, 1973

The Alaska Governor's Mansion, located at 716 Calhoun Avenue in Juneau, Alaska, United States, is the official residence of the governor of Alaska, the first spouse of Alaska, and their families. It was designed by James Knox Taylor. The Governor's Mansion was first occupied in 1912 by Territorial Governor Walter Eli Clark.

== History ==
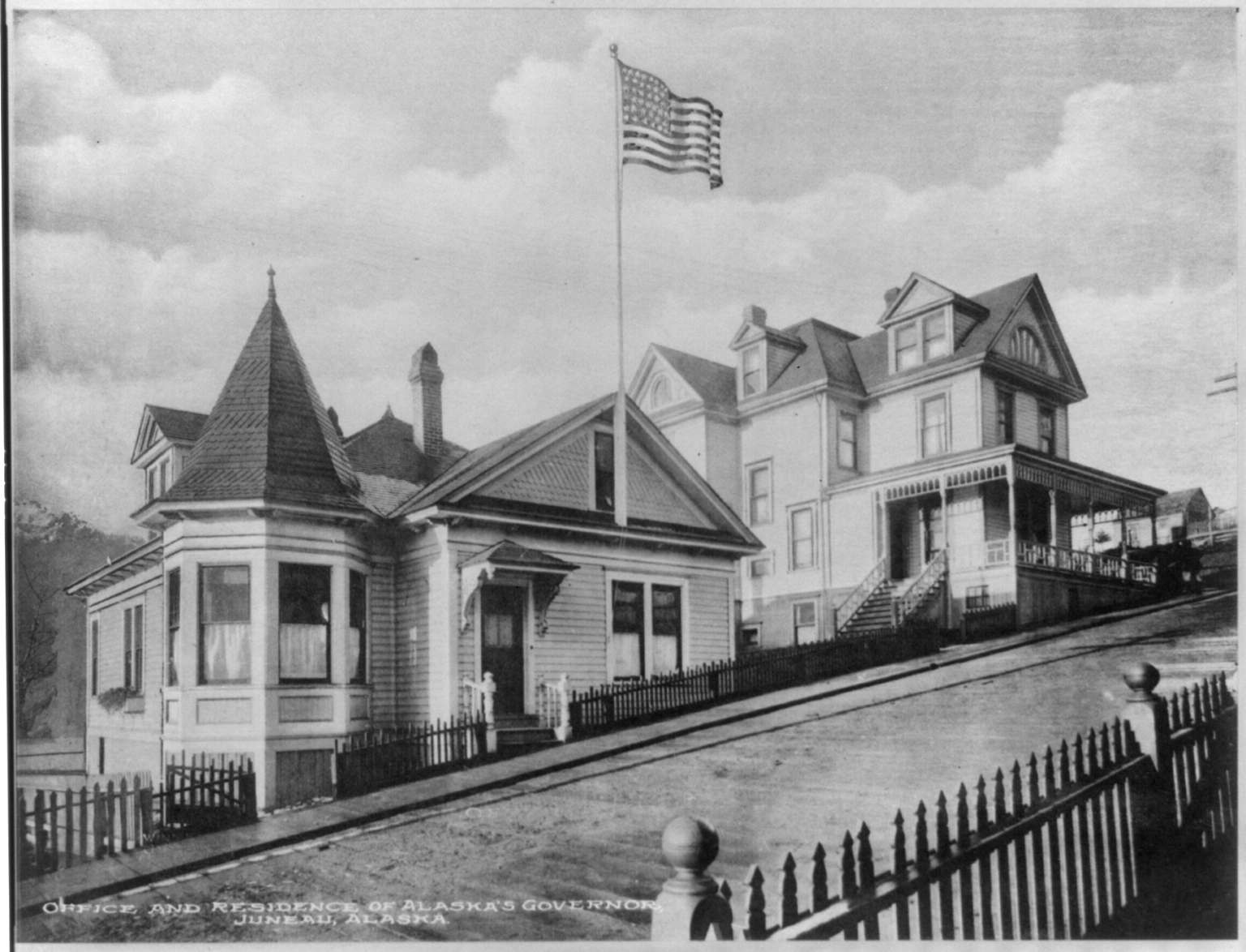
Office and residence of Alaska's governor, 1909

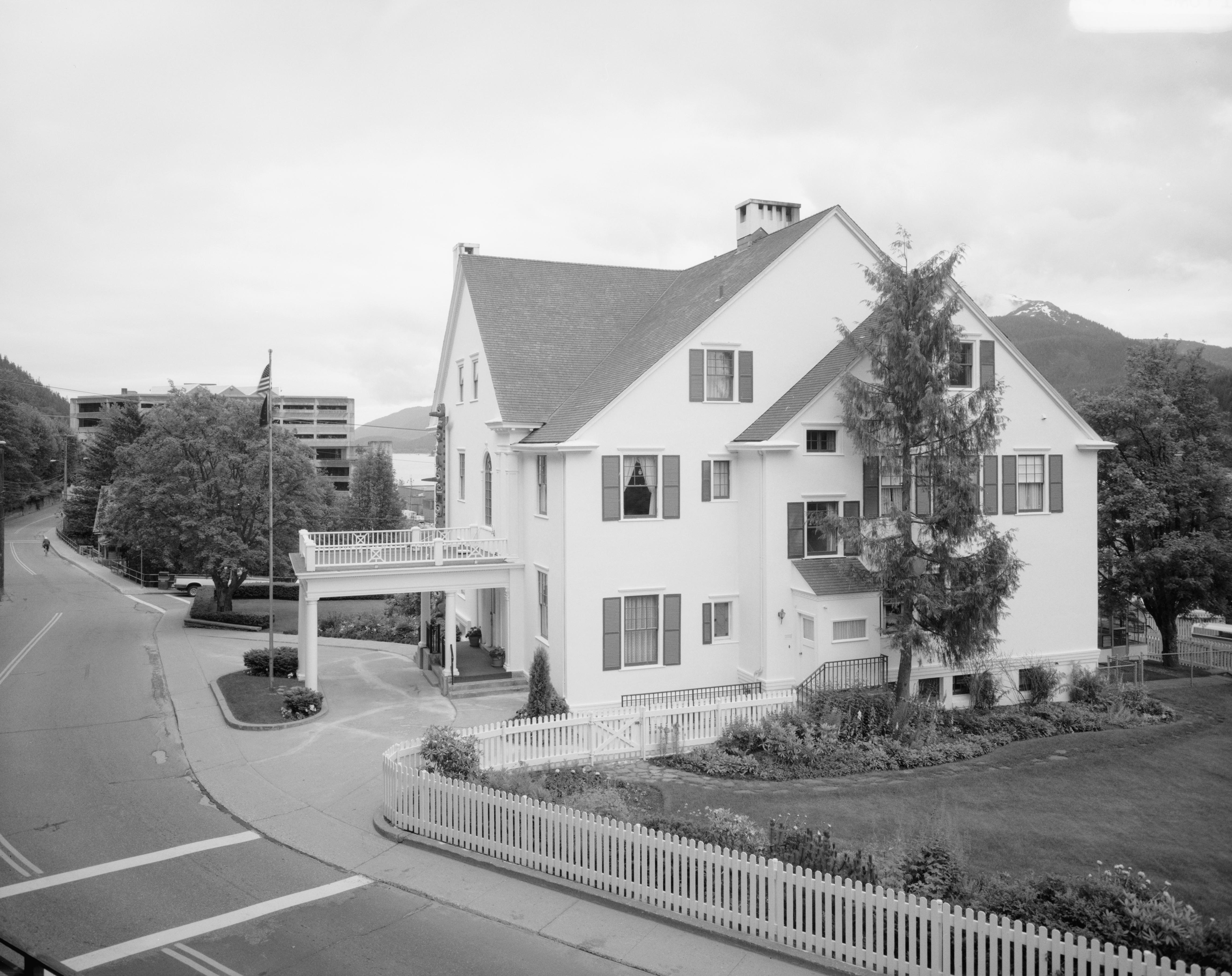
The Alaska Governor’s Mansion in 1991

The original budget for the 2½-story 12,900-square-foot (1,200 m^{2}) frame structure and furnishing was $40,000 and included planned servants quarters and a territorial museum on the third floor which were never built.

The first floor includes a reception hall, drawing room, library, dining room, office, kitchen, two pantries, and a conservatory. The second floor contains four large bedrooms, a sewing room and three bathrooms.

In 1936, the wood finish of the exterior was plastered over and painted white.

Between 1939 and 1940, Tlingit carvers Charlie Tagook and William N. Brown crafted a totem pole that sits outside the mansion on commission from the Civilian Conservation Corps.

From 1967 to 1968, two guest suites and one large bedroom were added to the third floor.

In 1983, a $2.5 million renovation that restored the interior decor to its original 1912 design also included new heating, electrical, plumbing and security systems.

In its current configuration the number of rooms in the mansion, excluding great halls, garages, closets, and bathrooms, is twenty-six. There are ten bathrooms, six bedrooms, and eight fireplaces, amounting to a total area of 14,400 square feet (1,340 m^{2}).

== Notable visitors ==
- President Warren G. Harding in 1923.
- Charles Lindbergh in 1969.
- Former President Gerald Ford in 1989.

== See also ==
- List of governors of Alaska
- National Register of Historic Places listings in Juneau, Alaska
