= The Colleges of Law =

Private law school in California, United States

Coordinates: 34.42458°N 119.70505°W

- Established: 1969
- School type: Non-profit
- Dean: Brandy Price
- Location: Santa Barbara and Ventura, California, United States
- Enrollment: 400
- Faculty: 38
- Bar pass rate: 47% (July 2023 Ventura 1st time takers)
- Website: collegesoflaw.edu

The Colleges of Law is a non-profit law school in Santa Barbara and Ventura, California. It is accredited by the WASC Senior College and University Commission and approved by the Committee of Bar Examiners of the State Bar of California.

== History ==
The Ventura campus was founded in 1969 and the Santa Barbara campus was added in 1975. In 2010, The Colleges of Law joined The Community Solution, an integrated nonprofit system of colleges and universities. In 2025, Brandy Price was appointed Dean and Chief Academic Officer, succeeding Jackie Gardina, who served COL for nine years.

The Colleges of Law is accredited by the WASC Senior College and University Commission. Additionally, the Juris Doctor program has been approved by the Committee of Bar Examiners of the State Bar of California for more than 30 years. This approval applies to both campuses (Santa Barbara and Ventura) and the pioneering Hybrid J.D. program. Upon graduation, students are eligible to take the California bar exam and practice law in California.

== Academics ==
=== Juris Doctor ===
The Colleges of Law, Ventura is a private, nonprofit law school established in 1969 and accredited by the WASC Senior College and University Commission as well as the Committee of Bar Examiners of the State Bar of California. The school is especially regarded for its accessibility, affordability, diversity, and emphasis on real-world legal skills.
