= Kanakanak, Dillingham =

Neighborhood in Dillingham, Alaska

Kanakanak is a neighborhood within the city of Dillingham in the Dillingham Census Area in the U.S. state of Alaska. It is located at 59°00′14″N 158°32′06″W, about 10 km (6 mi) southwest of downtown Dillingham. Kanakanak is the location of an Indian Health Service hospital operated by the Bristol Bay Area Health Corporation.

The name has been cited as the longest geographic palindrome. It is Yupik in origin and is said to mean "many noses," referring to the orphanage census that was located at the Kanakanak site after the 1918-1919 influenza epidemic.
