= 2012 Alaska elections =

- November 6, 2012

A general election was held in the state of Alaska on November 6, 2012. Primary elections were held on August 28, 2012.

== Federal ==
=== U.S. President ===
2012 U.S. presidential election in Alaska
Party	Candidate	Votes	%
Republican	Mitt Romney	164,676	54.80%
Democratic	Barack Obama	122,640	40.81%
Libertarian	Gary Johnson	7,392	2.46%
Green	Jill Stein	2,917	0.97%
Write-in		2,870	0.96%
Total votes		300,495	100%

=== U.S. House of Representatives ===
Republican incumbent Don Young, who has represented Alaska's at-large congressional district since 1973, ran for re-election.

2012 Alaska's at-large congressional district election
Party	Candidate	Votes	%
Republican	Don Young (incumbent)	185,296	63.94%
Democratic	Sharon Cissna	82,927	28.61%
Libertarian	Jim McDermott	15,028	5.19%
Independent	Ted Gianoutsos	5,589	1.93%
Write-in		964	0.33%
Total votes		289,804	100%

== State offices ==
=== State judiciary ===
Two statewide judicial seats were up for retention in 2012.

==== State Supreme Court ====
In the Alaska Supreme Court, one justice was up for retention: Justice Daniel Winfree who was appointed by Governor Sarah Palin in 2008.

Results by state house district Yes: 50–60%; 60–70%; 70–80%

Justice Winfree retention, 2012
Choice	Votes	%
For	165,777	64.93
Against	89,553	35.07
Total	255,330	100.00

==== Court of Appeals ====
In the Alaska Court of Appeals, one judge was up for retention: Judge Joel Bolger who was appointed by Governor Sarah Palin in 2008.

Results by state house district Yes: 50–60%; 60–70%; 70–80%

Judge Bolger retention, 2012
Choice	Votes	%
For	166,208	65.24
Against	88,563	34.76
Total	254,771	100.00

=== State legislature ===
==== Alaska Senate ====
Alaska Senate
Party	Before	After	Change
Republican	10	13	▲3
Democratic	10	7	▼3
Total	20	20	

==== Alaska House of Representatives ====
Alaska House of Representatives
Party	Before	After	Change
Republican	24	25	▲1
Democratic	16	15	▼1
Total	40	40	

== Ballot measures ==
Four statewide ballot measures appeared on the ballot in Alaska: two in August and two in November.

=== Measure 1 (August) ===
Results by state house district Yes: 50–60%; 60–70%; No: 50–60%; 60–70%

The Increase Maximum Local Residential Property Tax Exemption Initiative would allow cities and boroughs to increase the maximum residential property tax exemption from $20,000 to up to $50,000.

Ballot Measure 1 (August)
Choice	Votes	%
For	61,804	50.13
Against	61,495	49.87
Total	123,299	100.00
Source: Alaska Division of Elections

=== Measure 2 ===
Results by state house district Yes: 50–60%; 60–70%; No: 50–60%; 60–70%; 70–80%; 80–90%

The Alaska Coastal Management Question would establish a new coastal management program.

Ballot Measure 2
Choice	Votes	%
For	46,678	37.91
Against	76,440	62.09
Total	123,118	100.00
Source: Alaska Division of Elections

=== Bonding Proposition A ===
The Alaska Transportation Project Bonds Question would allow for a general obligation bond to be issued for the purpose of transportation projects in the state.

Results by state house district Yes: 50–60%; 60–70%; 70–80%

Bonding Proposition A
Choice	Votes	%
For	159,976	58.13
Against	115,222	41.87
Total	275,198	100.00
Source: Alaska Division of Elections

=== Measure 1 (November) ===
The Alaska Constitutional Convention Question would create a convention to revise, alter or amend the state constitution.

Results by state house district No: 50–60%; 60–70%; 70–80%

Ballot Measure 1 (November)
Choice	Votes	%
For	90,079	33.41
Against	179,567	66.59
Total	269,646	100.00
Source: Alaska Division of Elections
