= Greenlandic cuisine =

Culinary traditions of Greenland

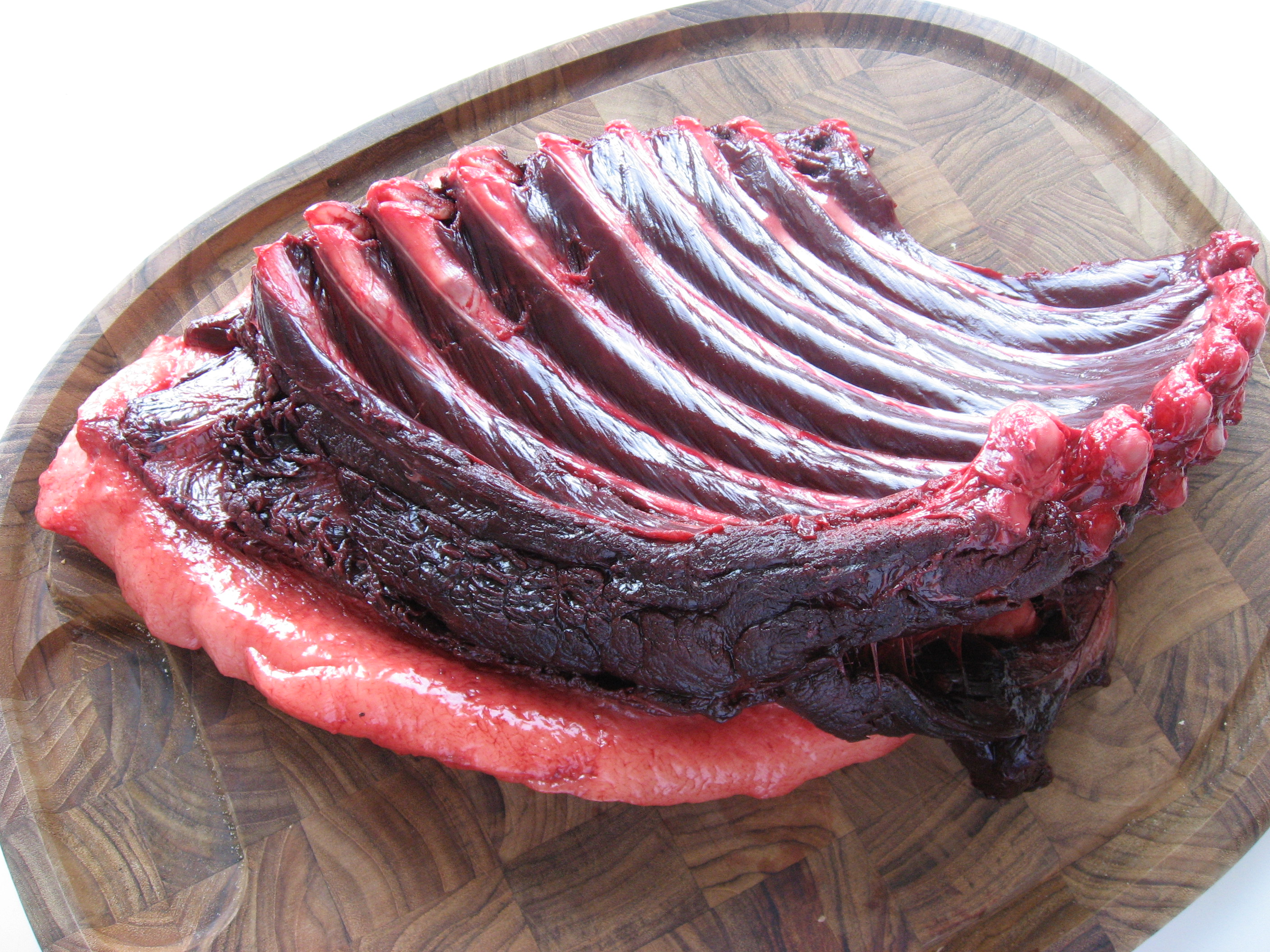
Harp seal (Pagophilus groenlandicus) seal meat, harvested in Upernavik, a town on northern West Greenland

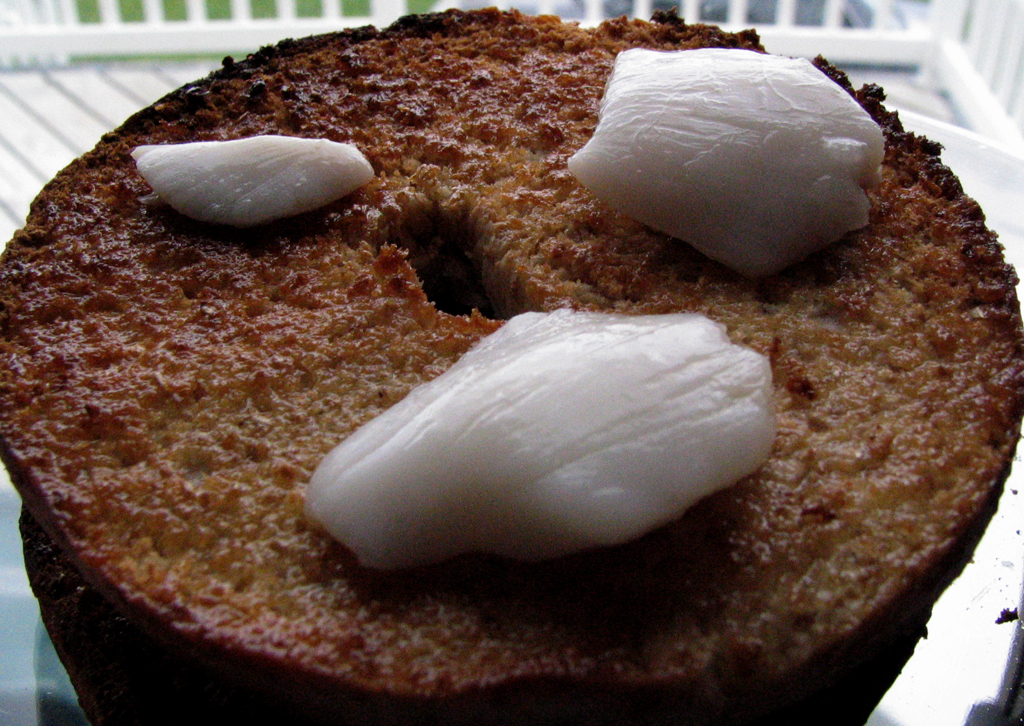
Cheek of Greenland halibut on a toasted bagel

Greenlandic cuisine is traditionally based on meat from marine mammals, birds, and fish, and normally contains high levels of protein. Since colonization and the arrival of international trade, the cuisine has been increasingly influenced by Danish, British, American and Canadian cuisine. During the summer when the weather is milder, meals are often eaten outdoors.

== National dish ==
The national dish of Greenland is suaasat, a traditional Greenlandic soup. It is often made from seal, whale, reindeer, or seabirds. The soup often includes onions and potatoes, and is simply seasoned with salt and pepper, or bay leaf. The soup is often thickened with rice, or by soaking barley in the water overnight so that the starches leach into the water. It is also a traditional Inuit food.

== Seafood ==
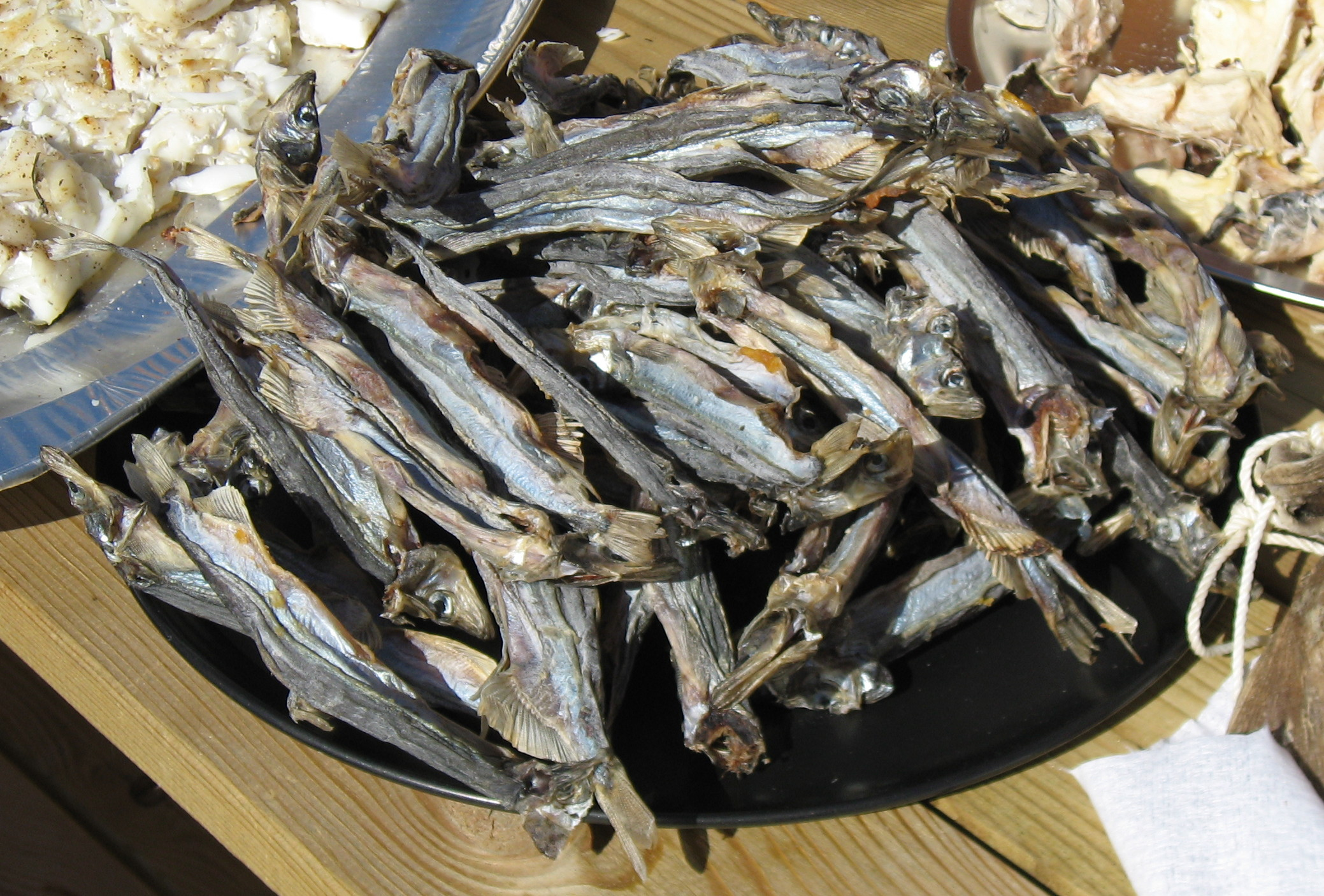
Dried capelin (Mallotus villosus), or ammassat

Because the majority of Greenland is covered by permanent glaciers, the sea is the source for most food. Seafood dishes include various fishes (often smoked), mussels, and shrimp. Ammassat or capelin is commonly eaten and can easily be dried. Atlantic halibut, redfish, deepwater redfish, Greenland halibut, and lumpfish are fished from the west coast, as are Greenland cod (Gadus ogac) and shorthorn sculpin (Myoxocephalus scorpius), but these two are eaten only as a last resort. Arctic char is fished off the east coast. The Greenland shark (Somniosus microcephalus) is rarely eaten because it is poisonous but can be edible after a complicated preparation of either boiling the meat repeatedly or fermenting the meat.

Global warming has shifted the migration of Atlantic cod, allowing for commercial fishing off Greenland's east coast. Drift ice can create problems during fishing season. There are a couple of large-scale fish and shrimp processing factories in Greenland.

Sea mammals provide important staples to Greenlandic diets. A traditional Inuit specialty is mattak, the raw hide of narwhal or white whale. Mattak can be prepared with blubber, and occasionally dried reindeer meat. When eaten raw, mattak is an important source of vitamin C. Hunting hooded seals were traditionally an important annual social event as well as subsistence activity, which included men, women, and children. Also popular is arfivik, or bowhead whale, smoked whale meat served with onions and potato. Dried cod and whale with whale blubber is a popular lunch and snack food. Bearded and ringed seals are hunted year round, especially by Polar Inuit, while narwhals and white whales are hunted during the summer. Subsistence whale hunting by indigenous peoples is legal, but some animal rights organizations are concerned about commercial whale hunting in Greenland, with one company, Arctic Green Food, freezing and distributing a quarter of Greenland's whale meat.

== Meat ==
Land-based dishes include reindeer, lamb, mutton, and muskox, which can be served tartare. Sheep farming and cattle ranching were introduced to Greenland by the Norse. Reindeer are hunted in the fall, foxes and hares year round, musk-oxen in the spring, and polar bear are hunted in the spring and fall. Meats can be boiled, dried, frozen, fermented, or occasionally eaten raw. Reindeer livers are consumed raw, immediately after the hunt.

== Birds ==
There are 21 species of birds that legally can be hunted in Greenland, although there are various restrictions (region, period, numbers or method) for several of them. Spring to fall is the primary season for hunting birds. Among others, the Greenlandic Inuit hunt dovekie, common and king eider, ptarmigan, thick-billed murre, and a variety of sea gulls. Additionally, kittiwake and ptarmigan are hunted on the east coast. Sometimes wild eggs are gathered by hunters.

== Plants ==
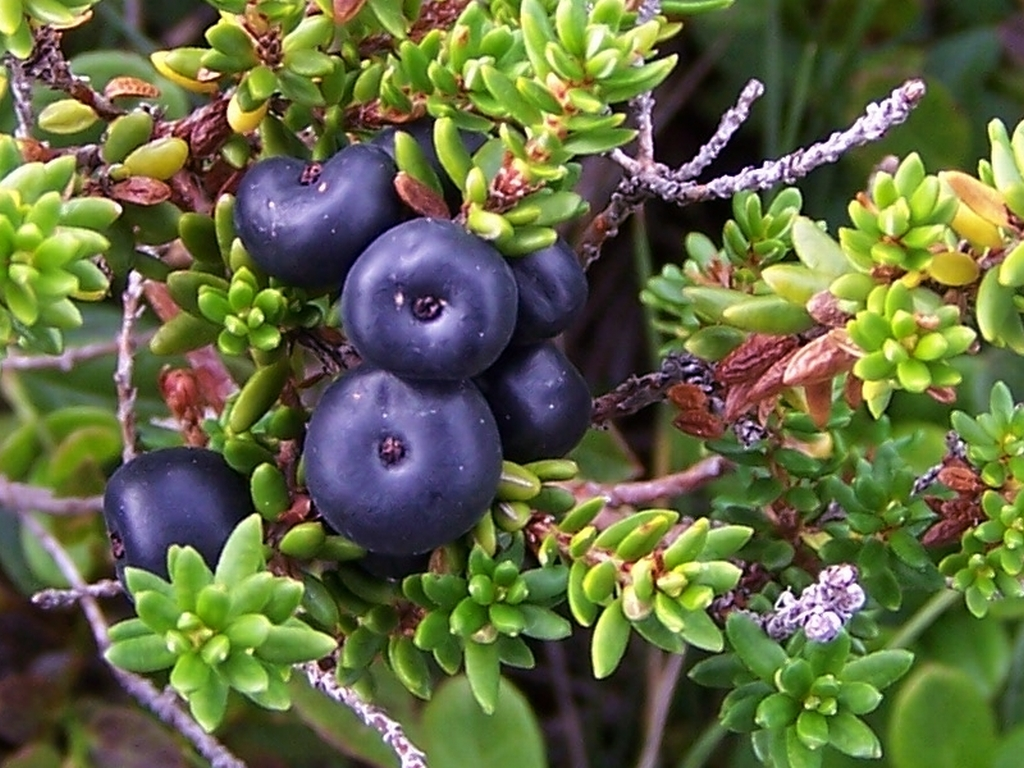
Crowberries (Empetrum nigrum)

Blueberries and crowberries (Empetrum nigrum), harvested in the autumn, often garnish cakes and other desserts. Berry compotes accompany meat dishes. Seaweed is stored as a reserve food for winter. During the summer, roseroot (Sedum rosea), fireweed (Epilobium) leaves, and Greenland lousewort (Pedicularis groenlandica) are gathered. Green vegetables are scarce but global climate change has slightly extended the growing season, so Greenlandic farmers are experimenting with new crops, such as broccoli. Rice and potatoes are common starches in meals. Onions are commonly found in meals.

== Beverages ==
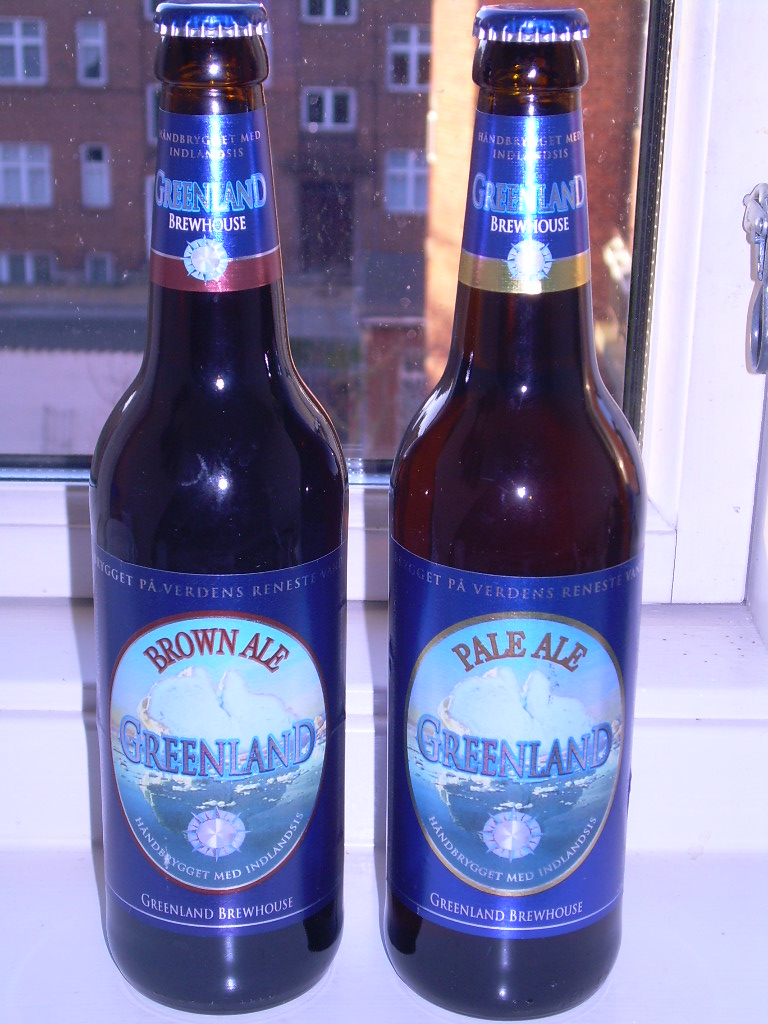
Greenland Brewhouse brown ale

Greenlandic coffee is a popular after-dinner drink. It typically features hot coffee, whiskey, Kahlúa, Grand Marnier, and whipped cream. Served in a bordeaux glass, the coffee is set on fire before drinking.

Ice beer, which features 2000-year-old natural Arctic ice harvested from glaciers, was pioneered by the Greenland Brewhouse in Narsaq. Currently, the Godthaab Bryghus, in Nuuk, and Icefiord Bryghus, in Ilulissat, brew with glacial water. Both crowberries and angelica are brewed into ales at the Icefiord Brewery.

Until 1954, alcohol sales were heavily restricted in Greenland, so homebrewing is widely popular.

== Markets ==
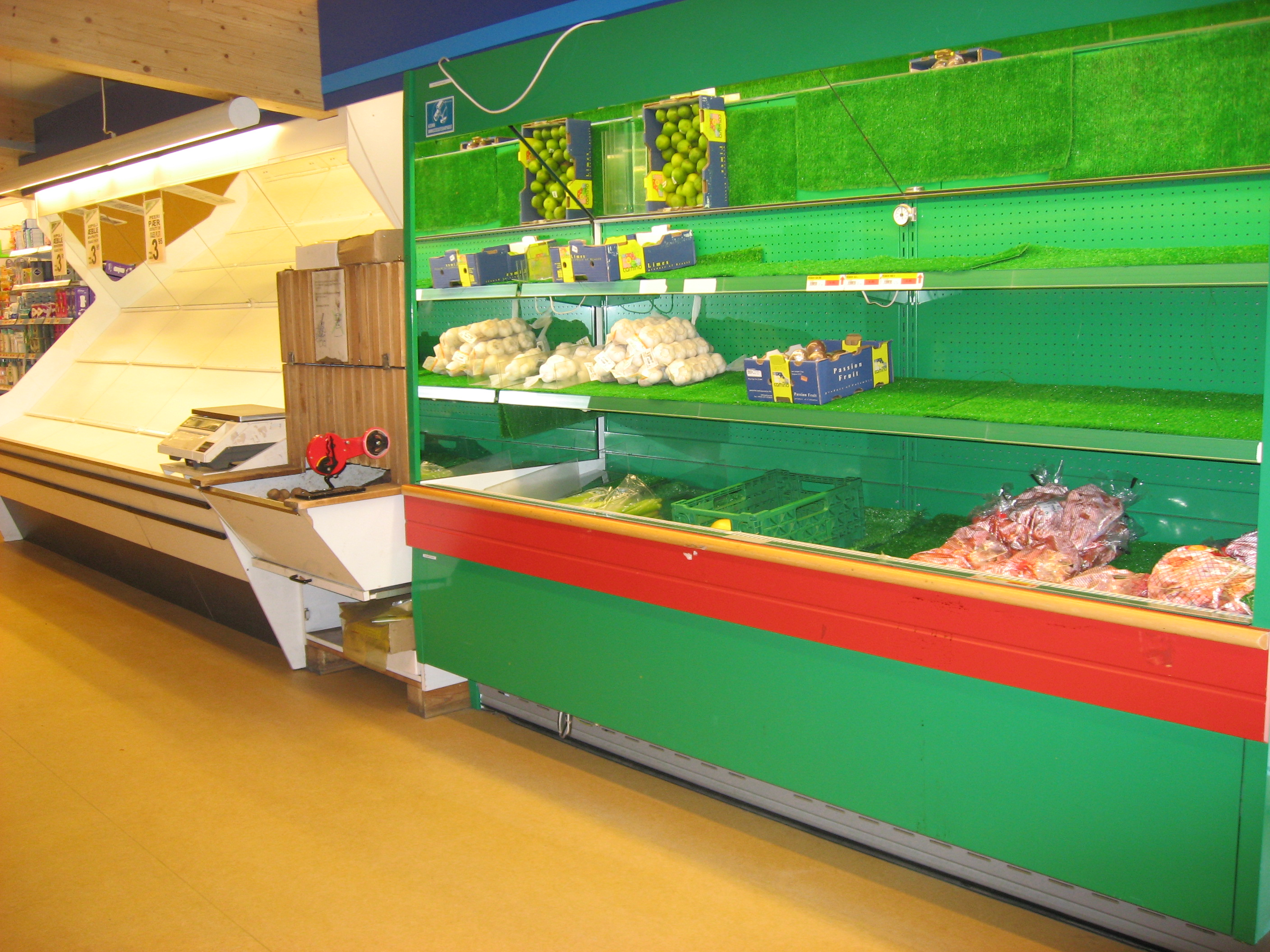
Produce section of the only grocery store in Upernavik

Animal foods comprised most of the Greenland Inuit diet until around 1980 (and still do today in some regions), but grocery stores now provide coffee, tea, biscuits, potato chips, and other foods. Depending on location, the diversity of fresh fruit and vegetables varies greatly during the year. In the capital Nuuk, the diversity is considerably higher and more consistent year-round than in smaller, more isolated places further north. In more isolated regions, supplies depend on ice cover and can typically be delivered by ship during the summer (approximately May through November, but varies depending on exact location) where the diversity is mostly better than in the winter period, where vegetables and fruit only can be delivered by plane.

== See also ==
- Arctic vegetation
- Danish cuisine
- Inuit diet
- Kalaallit
- Reindeer hunting in Greenland
- Ulu
