= Seal meat =

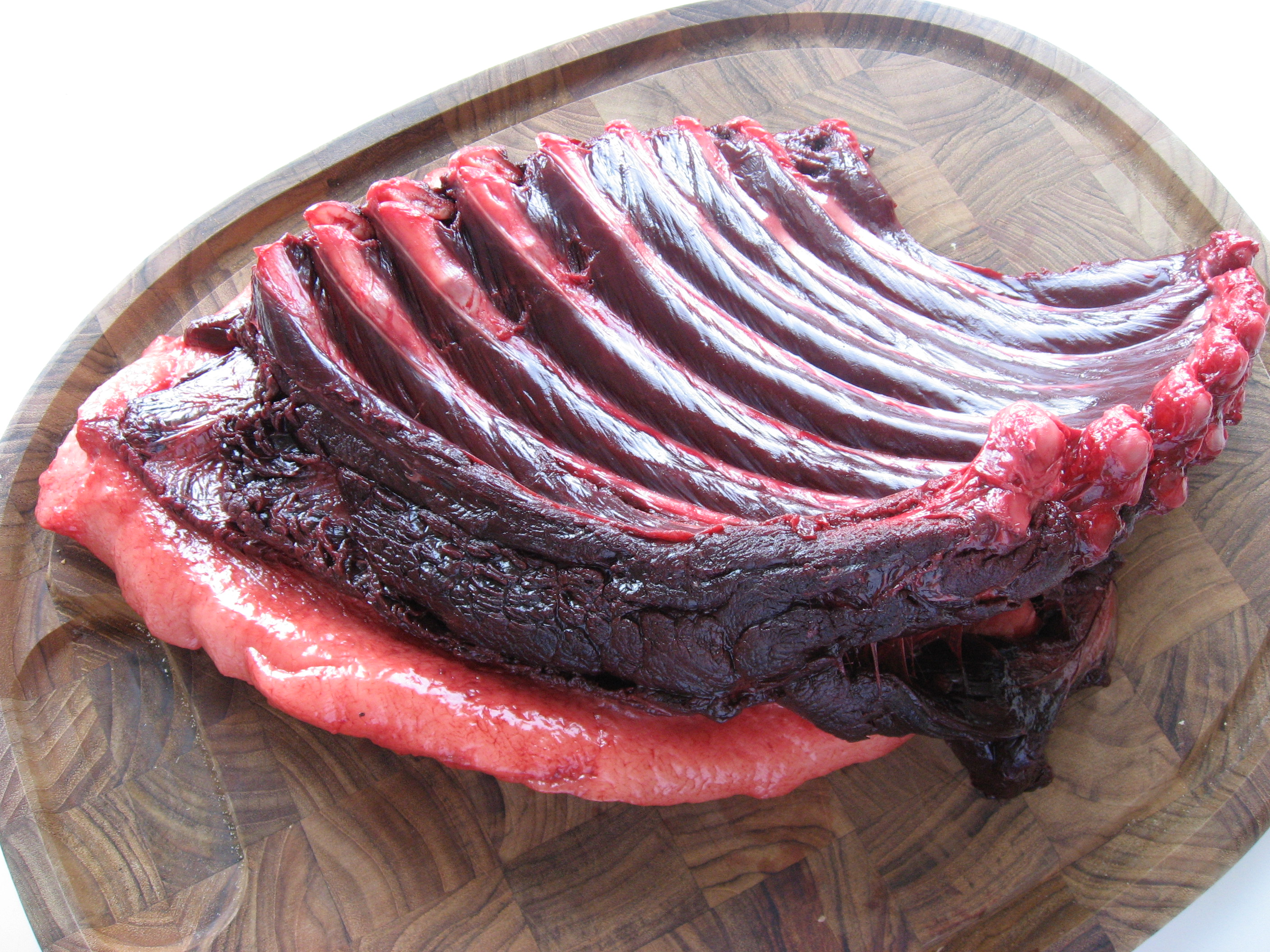
Meat from young harp seal

Seal meat is the flesh, including the blubber and organs, of seals used as food for humans or other animals. It is prepared in numerous ways, often being hung and dried before consumption. Historically, it has been eaten in many parts of the world.

Practice of seal consumption by humans continues today in Japan, Canada and Norway.

== Nutritional value ==
Seal meat
Nutritional value per 100 g (3.5 oz)
- Fat: 3.2g
- Saturated: .820g
- Monounsaturated: 1.720g
- Polyunsaturated: 0.060g
- Protein: 28.4 g
Vitamins and minerals
Vitamins	Quantity %DV^{†}
Vitamin A equiv.	13% 116 μg
Thiamine (B1)	83% 1 mg
Riboflavin (B2)	41% 0.530 mg
Pantothenic acid (B5)	13% 0.650 mg
Minerals	Quantity %DV^{†}
Calcium	0% 5 mg
Iron	109% 19.60 mg
Phosphorus	19% 238 mg
Sodium	5% 110 mg
- ^{†}Percentages estimated using US recommendations for adults.

Seal blubber and meat was studied to help understand the nutritional composition. Two species were evaluated by the Department of Biology of the University of Bergen and the National Institute of Nutrition and Seafood Research. The species were the hooded seal (Cystophora cristata) and harp seal (Phagophilus groenlandicus). The specimens used in the study were taken from Greenland's West Ice.

Seal meat in general is lean, containing less than 2% fat. This fat is mostly MUFAs, long- and very long chain omega-3 PUFAs. Also, the meat is high in protein and has an amino acid composition that is well balanced.

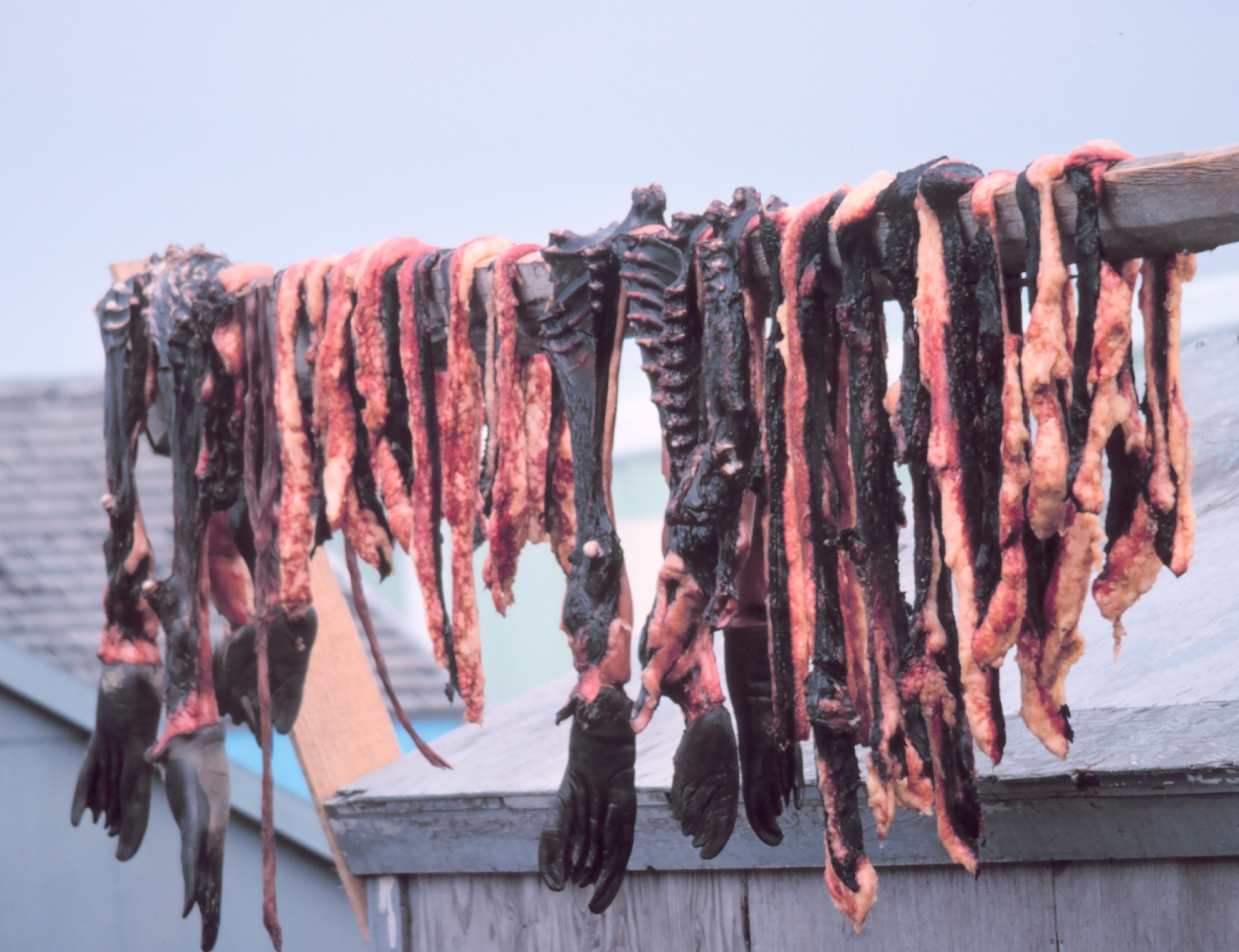
Seal meat hanging to dry on St. Lawrence Island

The study showed significant differences in nutritional composition from one seal to another. This may have been due to the highly varied age and size of the seals tested. In general, both the meat and blubber can be considered to be high quality food in terms of bioactive components and nutrients. On average, a woman's recommended daily intake of vitamin B12 and iron can be met with only 40 grams of seal meat.

A significant difference between species was found in the eicosapentaenoic acid (EPA) content of both the meat and blubber. Harp seal blubber contained 9.2% while the muscle tissue contained only 3%.

High levels of trace elements were found. In particular, hooded seal muscle meat contained 379 μg/g of iron and harp seal muscle meat contained 30 μg/g of zinc.

High levels of mercury have been found in the blubber of seals of the Canadian arctic.

== See also ==
- Country food
- Inuit cuisine
- Chukchi cuisine
- Flipper pie
- Marine mammals as food
- Wildlife trade
