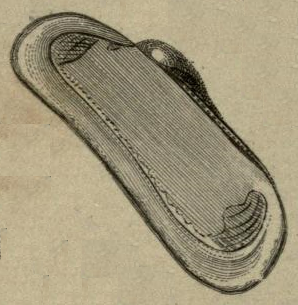
- Illustration from S.P. Woodward's book

Scientific classification
- Kingdom: Animalia
- Phylum: Mollusca
- Class: Bivalvia
- Order: Mytilida
- Family: Mytilidae
- Genus: Adipicola
- Species: A. pelagica

Binomial name
- Adipicola pelagica (Forbes in Woodward, 1854)

Synonyms
- Idas pelagica (Forbes in Woodward, 1854); Idas pelagicus (Forbes in Woodward, 1854); Modiola pelagica Woodward, 1854; Modiolarca pelagica Forbes in Woodward, 1854; Myrina dalmasi Dautzenberg & H. Fischer, 1897; Myrina denhami H. Adams & A. Adams, 1854

= Adipicola pelagica =

Species of bivalve

Adipicola pelagica is a species of saltwater clam, a marine bivalve mollusc in the family Mytilidae, the mussels. It is a deepwater species and is found attached to the bones and tissues of whales that have died and sunk to the seabed, and sometimes to fragments of decomposing carcases which have sloughed off and floated to the surface.

== History ==
In 1854, a small bivalve mollusc was found attached to some whale blubber found floating off the coast of South Africa. The mollusc was passed to the British malacologist Samuel Pickworth Woodward, who determined that the mollusc was new to science, and formally described it, naming the new species Adipicola pelagica. In 1927, the mollusc was seen again, this time attached to some floating whale debris in the northern Atlantic Ocean, and in 1964, a number of individuals were dredged up in the South Atlantic attached to a whale skull from a depth of 439 m (1,440 ft).

== Description ==
A common length for this elongated, brownish mussel is 15 mm (0.6 in).

== Distribution and habitat ==
All the sightings of this mussel have been from the Atlantic Ocean, and in 1987, the New Zealand malacologist Richard Dell concluded that the mussel's range probably extended from the Azores to South Africa. It lives on dead whale carcases on the sea bed at depths between 400 and 1,800 m (1,300 and 5,900 ft). Some of the mussels had been found attached to pieces of floating tissue that broke away from decomposing carcases and rose to the surface, and these may have drifted away from the species' normal distributional range. Another individual of A. pelagica, found near the Azores, was dredged from a depth of 2,450 m (8,000 ft).
