= Flipper pie =

Regional pie dish in Canada

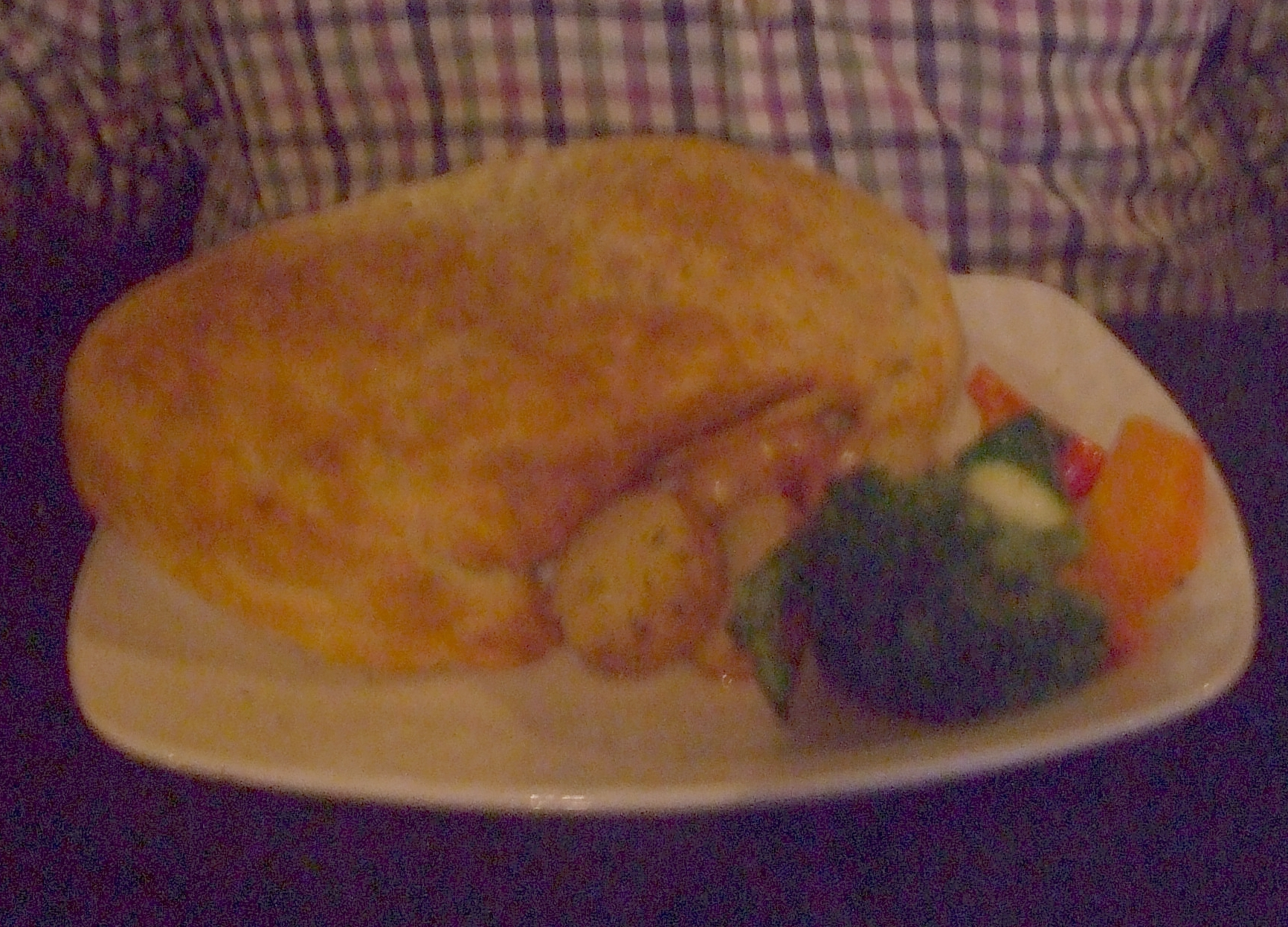
- Flipper pie as served at Woodstock Colonial Restaurant
- Type: Meat pie
- Place of origin: Canada
- Region or state: Newfoundland and Labrador
- Main ingredients: Harp seal flippers

Flipper pie, also known as seal flipper pie, is a traditional Eastern Canadian meat pie made from harp seal flippers. The seal flippers are cooked with vegetables in a thick sauce and then covered with pastry. It is specific to the province of Newfoundland and Labrador and primarily eaten in April and May, during the annual seal hunt. Although in the past, seal flippers were usually acquired directly from the boats that were used for the seal hunt (since they were considered a by-product of the seal fur trade), today they are usually purchased in grocery stores. Seal meat has been described as tasting like rabbit or dark meat chicken, and fans of its flavor tend to be people who grew up eating it.

== History ==
Flipper pie has been prepared and eaten during Lent and the annual seal hunt since at least 1555.

== See also ==
- Seal meat
- Cuisine of Canada
