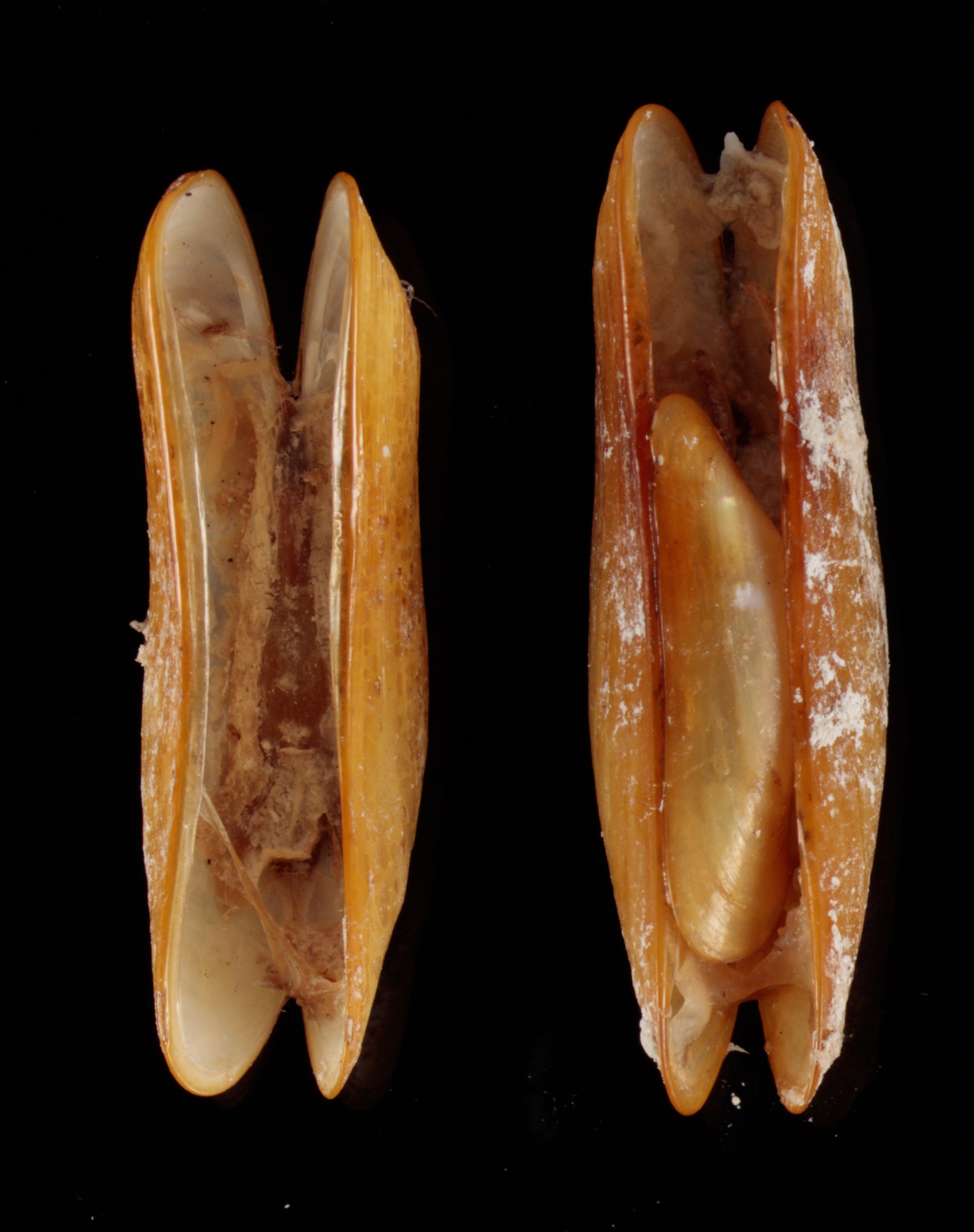

Scientific classification
- Kingdom: Animalia
- Phylum: Mollusca
- Class: Bivalvia
- Order: Mytilida
- Family: Mytilidae
- Genus: Adipicola; Dautzenberg, 1927

= Adipicola =

Genus of bivalves

Adipicola is a genus of saltwater clams, marine bivalve molluscs in the family Mytilidae, the mussels.

== Species ==
The World Register of Marine Species lists the following species:

- Adipicola apenninica Danise, Bertolaso & Dominici, 2016 †
- Adipicola chikubetsuensis (Amano, 1984) †
- Adipicola crypta (Dall, Bartsch & Rehder, 1938)
- Adipicola dubia (Prashad, 1932)
- Adipicola iwaotakii (Habe, 1958)
- Adipicola leticiae Signorelli & Crespo, 2017
- Adipicola longissima (Thiele, 1931)
- Adipicola osseocola Dell, 1987
- Adipicola pacifica (Dall, Bartsch & Rehder, 1938)
- Adipicola pelagica (Forbes in Woodward, 1854)
- Adipicola projecta (Verco, 1908)
- Adipicola simpsoni (Marshall, 1900) is now accepted as Idas simpsoni (J. T. Marshall, 1900)

According to NCBI:

- Adipicola arcuatilis
- Adipicola crypta
- Adipicola iwaotakii
- Adipicola longissima
- Adipicola pacifica
