= Inuit cuisine =

Culinary traditions of the Inuit

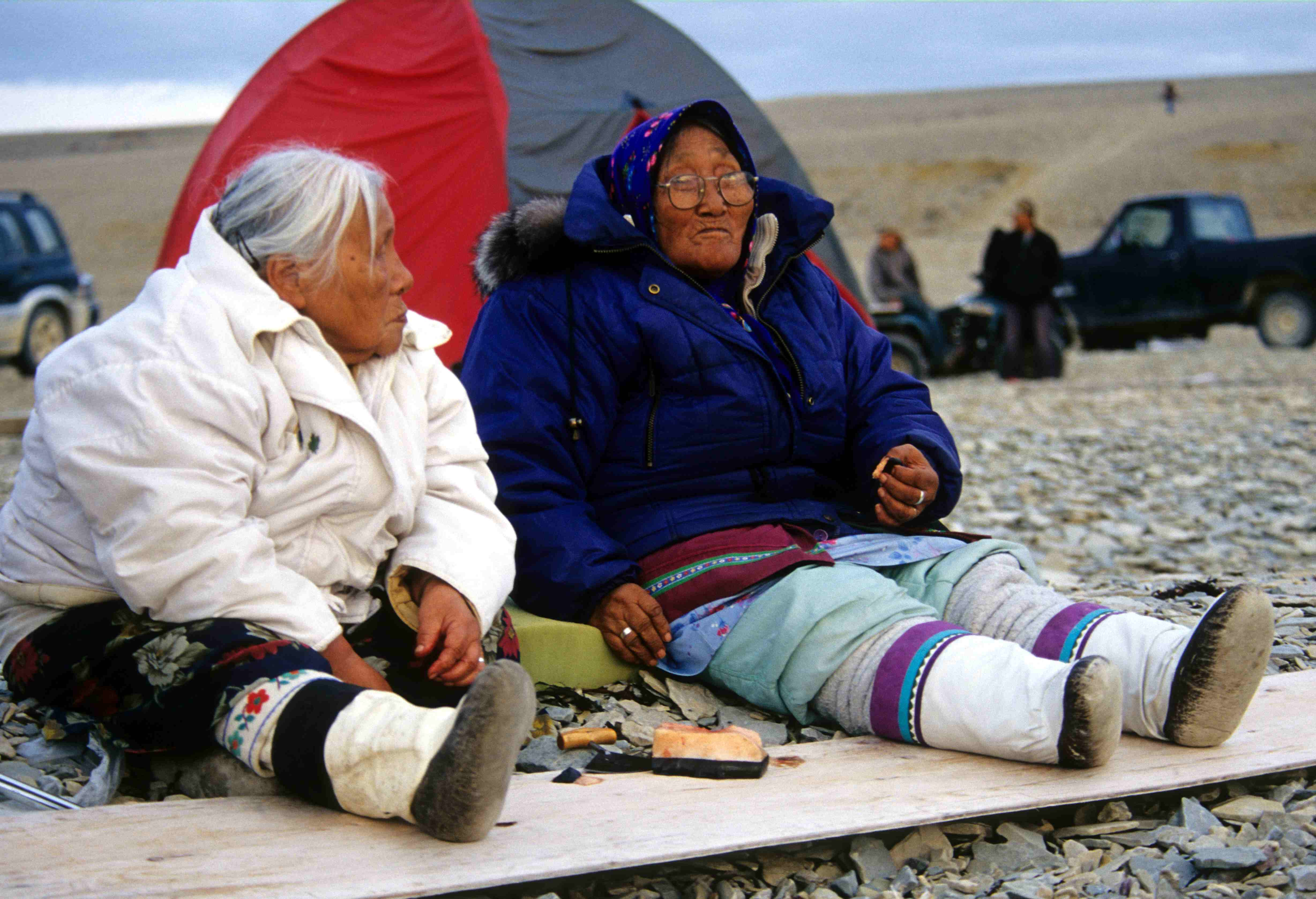
Inuit elders eating maktaaq

Historically, Inuit cuisine, which is taken here to include the Greenlandic, the Yupʼik and Aleut cuisines, consisted of a diet of animal source foods that were fished, hunted, and gathered locally.

After hunting, they often honour the animals' spirit by singing songs and performing rituals. Although traditional or country foods still play an important role in the identity of Inuit, much food is purchased from the store, which has led to health problems and food insecurity. According to Edmund Searles in his article Food and the Making of Modern Inuit Identities, they consume this type of diet because a mostly meat diet is "effective in keeping the body warm, making the body strong, keeping the body fit, and even making that body healthy".

== Food sources ==
- Hunted meats:
  - Sea mammals such as walrus, seal, and whale. Whale meat generally comes from the narwhal, beluga whale and the bowhead whale. The latter is able to feed an entire community for nearly a year from its meat, blubber, and skin. Inuit hunters most often hunt juvenile whales which, compared to adults, are safer to hunt and have tastier skin. Ringed seal and bearded seal are the most crucial aspect of an Inuit diet and often make up the largest part of an Inuk hunter's diet.
  - Land mammals such as caribou (reindeer), polar bear, and muskox
  - Birds and their eggs
  - Saltwater and freshwater fish including sculpin, Arctic cod, Arctic char, capelin and lake trout.
- While it is not possible to cultivate native plants for food in the Arctic, Inuit have traditionally gathered those that are naturally available, including:
  - Berries including crowberry and cloudberry
  - Herbaceous plants such as grasses and fireweed
  - Tubers and stems including mousefood, roots of various tundra plants which are cached by voles in burrows.
  - Roots such as tuberous spring beauty and sweet vetch
  - Seaweed

== Hunting practices ==
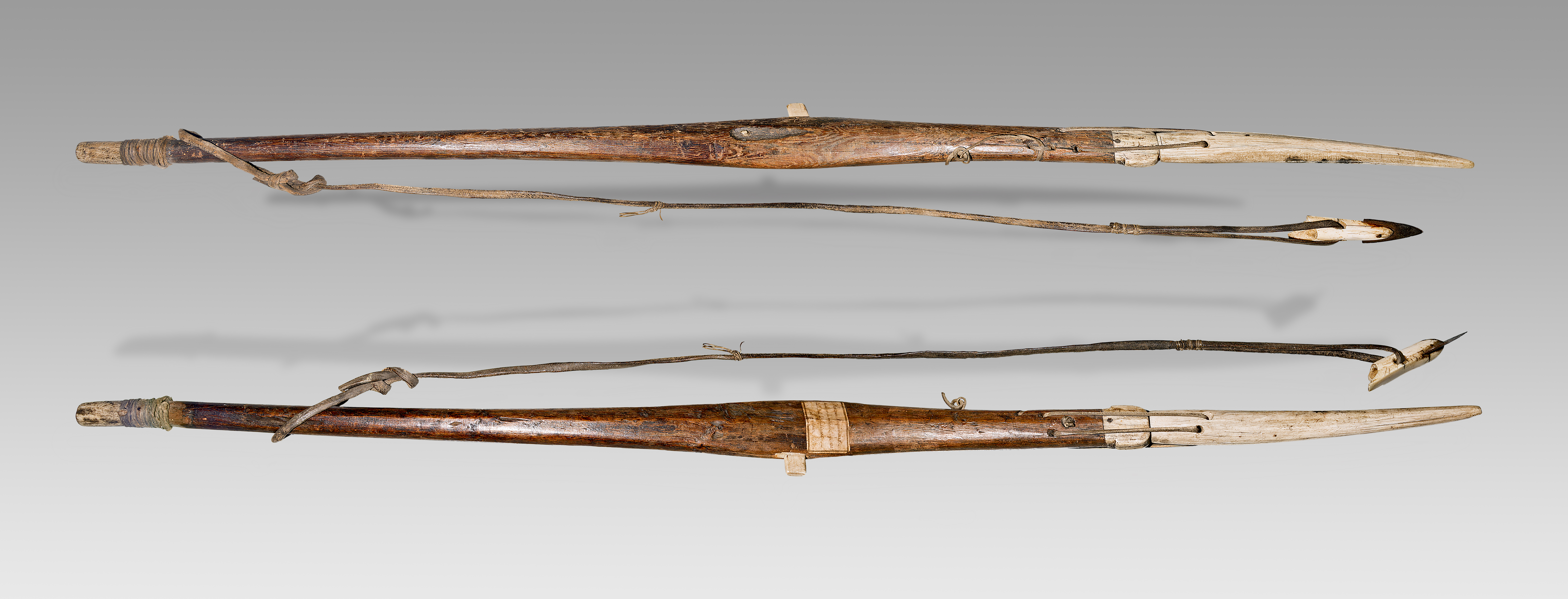
Toggling harpoon or unaaq MHNT

There has been a decline of hunting partially due to the fact that most young people lack the skills to survive off the land. They are no longer skilled in hunting like their ancestors and are growing more accustomed to the Qallunaat ("white people") food that they receive from the south. The high costs of hunting equipment—snowmobiles, rifles, sleds, camping gear, gasoline, and oil—is also causing a decline in families who hunt for their meals.

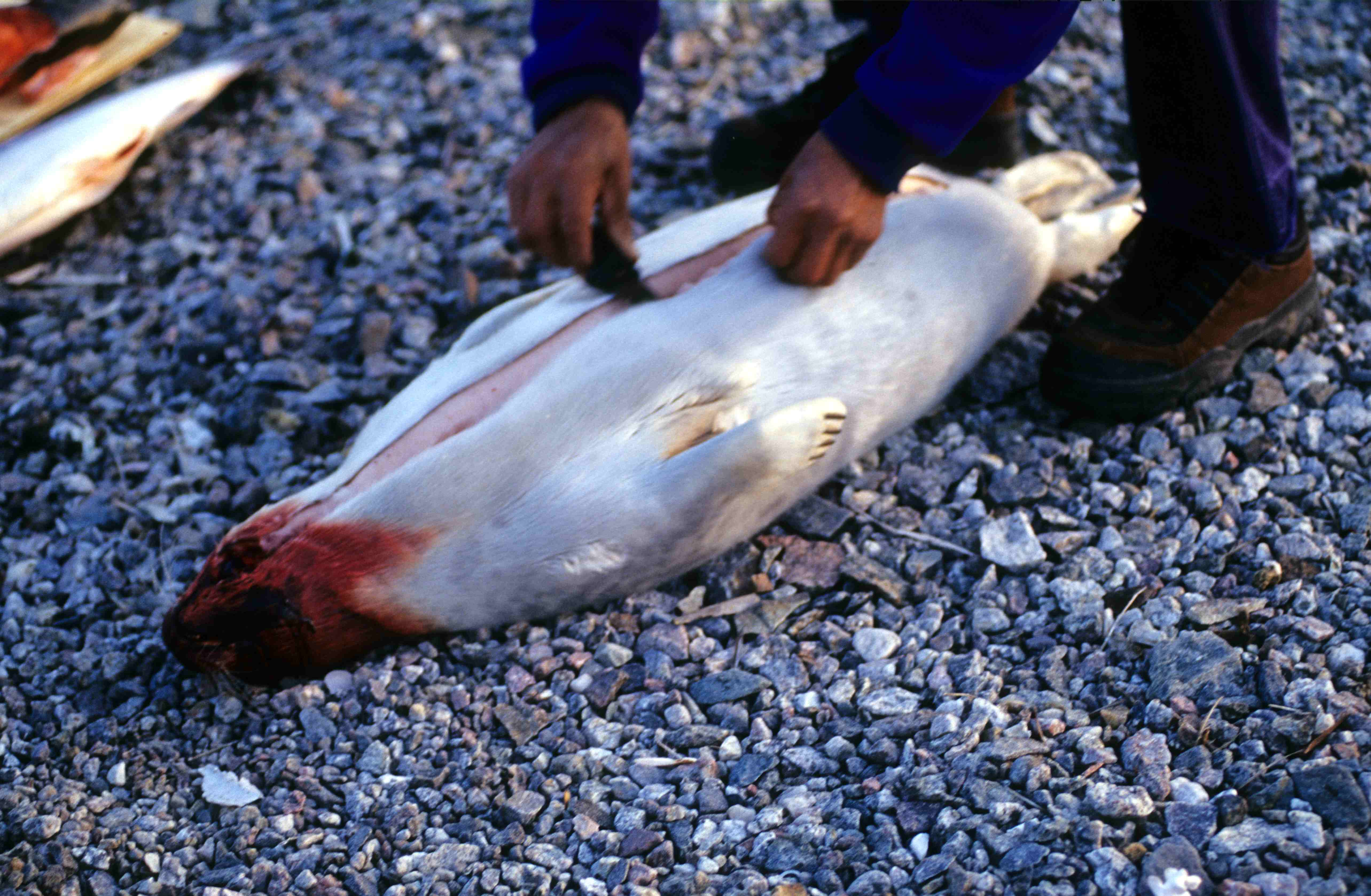
An Inuk hunter skinning a ringed seal

- Seal: Depending on the season, Inuit hunt for different types of seal: harp seal, harbour seal, and bearded seal. Ringed seals are hunted all year, while harp seals are only available during the summer. Because seals need to break through the ice to reach air, they form breathing holes with their teeth and claws. Through these, Inuit hunters are able to capture seals. When a hunter arrives at these holes, they set up a seal indicator that alerts the hunter when a seal is coming up for a breath of air. When the seal comes up, the hunter notices movement in the indicator and uses their harpoon, especially a toggling harpoon, to capture the seal in the water.

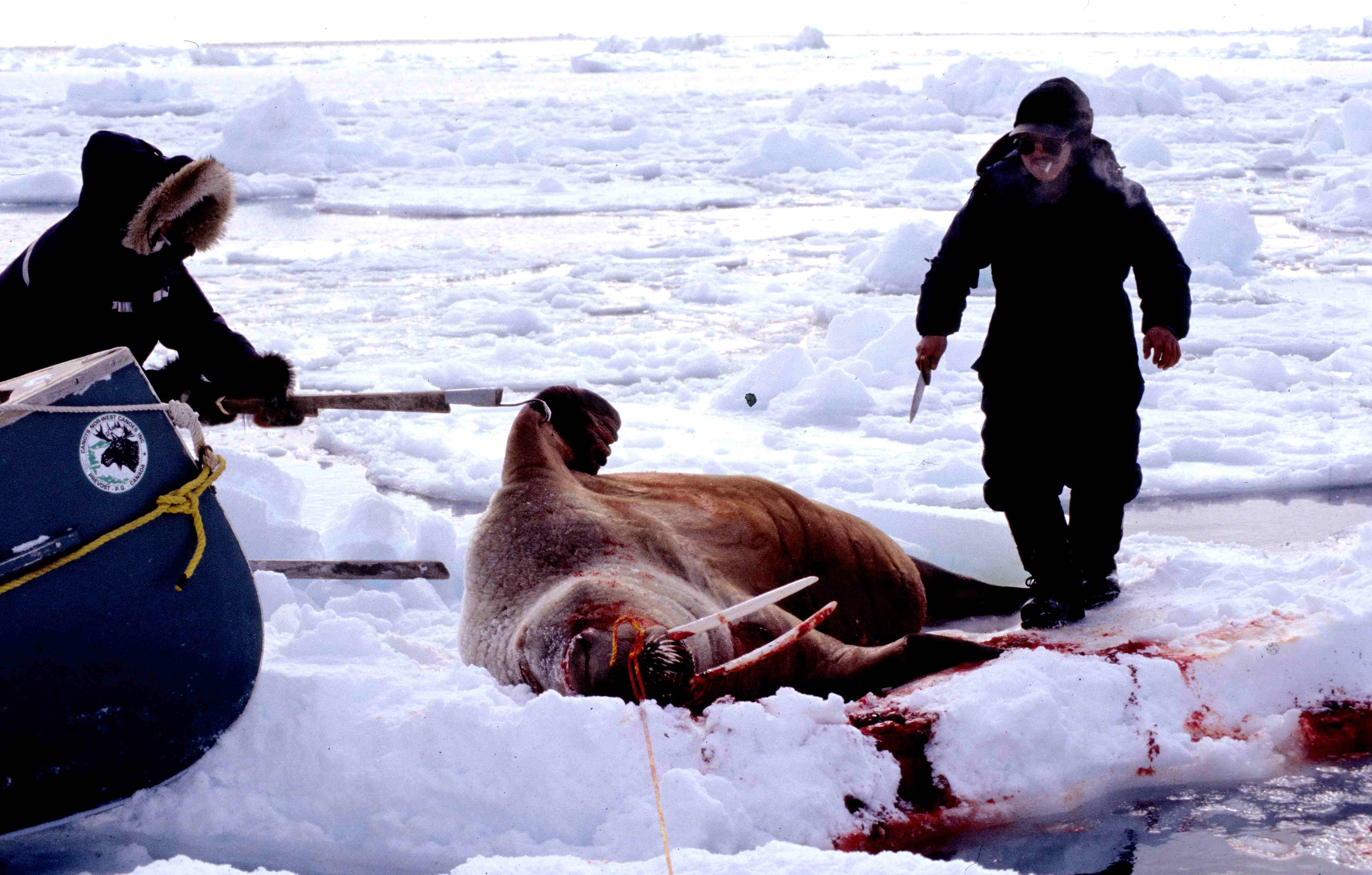
Walrus hunting

- Walrus: They are often hunted during the winter and spring since hunting them in summer is much more dangerous. A walrus is too large to be controlled by one person, so it cannot be hunted alone. In Uqalurait: An Oral History of Nunavut, an Inuk elder describes the hunt of a walrus in these words: "When a walrus was sighted, the two hunters would run to get close to it and at a short distance it is necessary to stop when the walrus's head was submerged... the walrus would hear you approach. [They] then tried to get in front of the walrus and it was harpooned while its head was submerged. In the meantime, the other person would drive the harpoon into the ice through the harpoon loop to secure it."
- Bowhead whale: Similar to walrus, they are captured by harpoon. The hunters use active pursuit to harpoon the whale and follow it during attack. At times, Inuit were known for using a more passive approach when hunting whales. According to John Bennett and Susan Rowley, a hunter would harpoon the whale and instead of pursuing it, would "wait patiently for the winds, currents, and spirits to aid him in bringing the whale to shore".

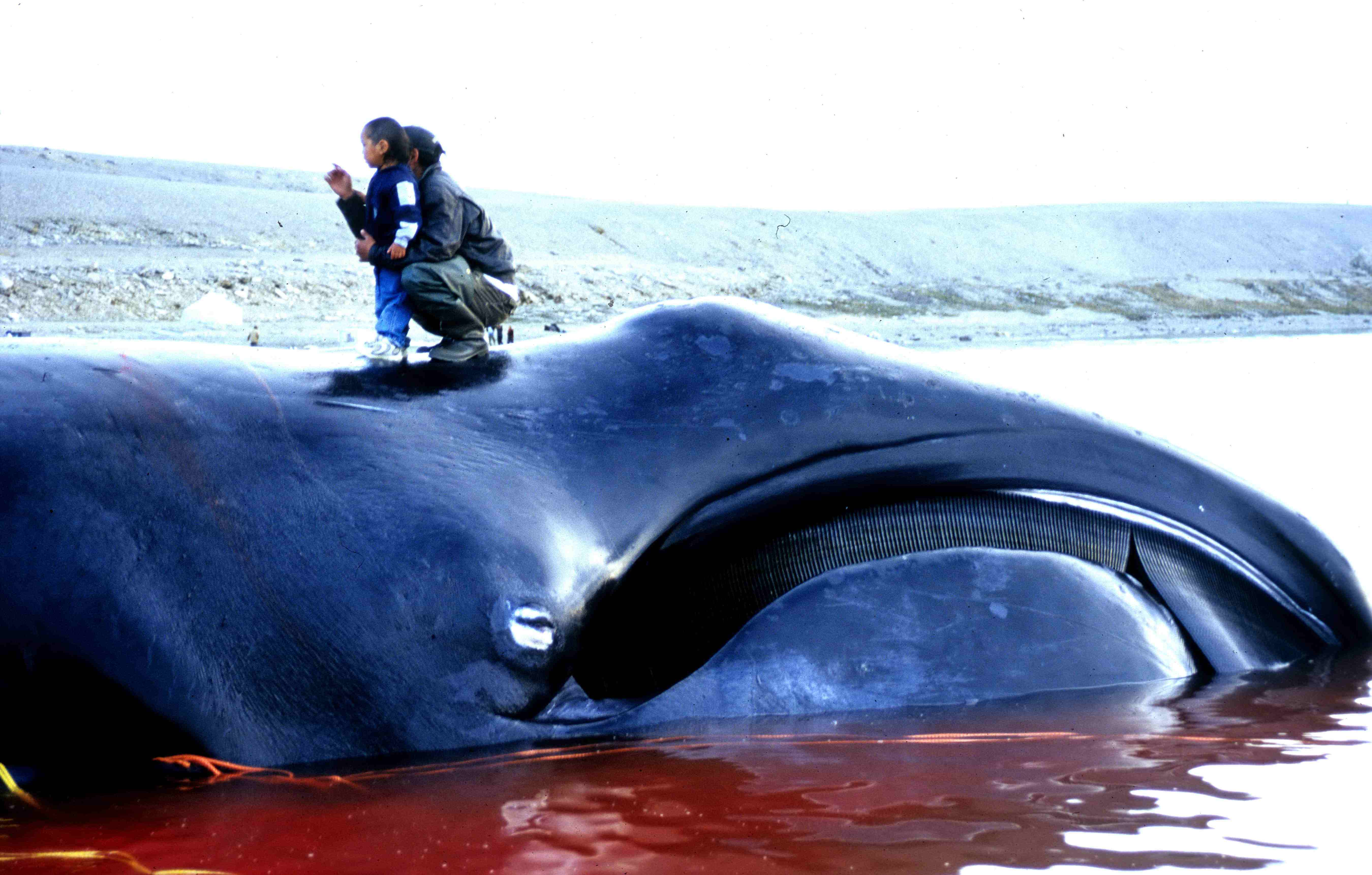
Bowhead whale (Balaena mysticetus), caught in an Inuit subsistence whale hunt in Igloolik, Nunavut in 2002

- Caribou (reindeer): During the majority of the year, they roam the tundra in small herds, but twice a year large herds of caribou cross the inland regions. Caribou have excellent senses of smell and hearing so that the hunters must be very careful when in pursuit. Often, Inuit hunters set up camp miles away from the caribou crossing and wait until they are in full view to attack. There are many ways in which the caribou can be captured, including spearing, forcing the animals into the river, using blinders, scaring them, and stalking them. When spearing caribou, hunters put the string of the spear in their mouths and the other end they use to gently spear the animal.
- Fish: They are caught by jigging. The hunter cuts a square hole in the ice on the lake and fishes using a fish lure and spear. Instead of using a hook on a line, Inuit use a fake fish attached to the line. They lower it into the water and move it around as if it is real. When the live fish approach it, they spear the fish before it has a chance to eat the fake fish.

== Nutrition ==
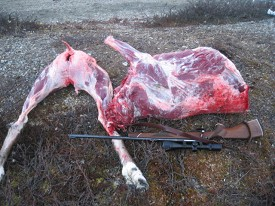
Caribou meat from hunt. Greenland

Because the climate of the Arctic is ill-suited for agriculture and lacks forageable plant matter for much of the year, the traditional Inuit diet is lower in carbohydrates and higher in fat and animal protein compared to the global average. When carbohydrate intake is inadequate for total energy requirements, protein is broken down in the liver through gluconeogenesis and utilized as an energy source. Inuit studied in the 1970s were found to have abnormally large livers, presumably to assist in this process. Their urine volumes were also high, a result of additional urea which the body uses to purge waste products from gluconeogenesis. However, in multiple studies the traditional Inuit diet has not been shown to be a ketogenic diet. Not only have multiple researchers been unable to detect any evidence of ketosis resulting from the traditional Inuit diet, but the ratios of fatty-acid to glucose were observed to be well below the generally accepted level of ketogenesis.

Inuit might consume more carbohydrates than most nutritionists have assumed. Because some of the meat the Inuit eat is raw and fresh, or freshly frozen, they can obtain more carbohydrates from their meat, as dietary glycogen, than Westerners can. The Inuit practice of preserving a whole seal or bird carcass under an intact whole skin with a thick layer of blubber also permits some proteins to ferment into carbohydrates. Furthermore, the blubber, organs, muscle and skin of the marine mammals that Inuit eat have significant glycogen stores, which assist those animals when oxygen is depleted on prolonged dives. For instance, when blubber is analyzed by direct carbohydrate measurements, it has been shown to contain as much as 8—30% carbohydrates. While postmortem glycogen levels are often depleted through the onset of rigor mortis, marine mammals have a much delayed onset of rigor mortis, even in warm conditions, presumably due to the high content of oxymyoglobin in the muscle that may permit aerobic metabolism to continue slowly for some time after the death of the animal. Additionally, in cold conditions, glycogen's depletion is halted at −18 °C (−0.4 °F) and lower temperatures in comminuted meat.

Traditional Inuit diets derive approximately 50% of their calories from fat, 30–35% from protein and 15–20% of their calories from carbohydrates, largely in the form of glycogen from the raw meat they consumed. This high fat content provides valuable energy and prevents protein poisoning, which historically was sometimes a problem in late winter when game animals grew lean through winter starvation. It has been suggested that because the fats of the Inuit's wild-caught game are largely monounsaturated and rich in omega-3 fatty acids, the diet does not pose the same health risks as a typical Western high-fat diet. However, actual evidence has shown that Inuit have a similar prevalence of coronary artery disease as non-Inuit populations and they have excessive mortality due to cerebrovascular strokes, with twice the risk to that of the North American population. Indeed, the cardiovascular risk of this diet is so severe that the addition of a more standard American diet has reduced the incidence of mortality in the Inuit population. Furthermore, fish oil supplement studies have failed to support claims of preventing heart attacks or strokes.

Vitamins and minerals which are typically derived from plant sources are nonetheless present in most Inuit diets. Vitamins A and D are present in the oils and livers of cold-water fishes and mammals. Vitamin C is obtained through sources such as reindeer liver, kelp, muktuk, and seal brain; because these foods are typically eaten raw or frozen, the vitamin C they contain, which would be destroyed by cooking, is instead preserved.

== Eating habits and food preparation ==
Searles defines Inuit food as mostly "eaten frozen, raw, or boiled, with very little mixture of ingredients and with very few spices added". Some preparations include:

- Akutaq: berries mixed with fat.
- Bannock: muqpujaq, punniq, palauga, muqpauraq ; fry bread / flatbread
- Food preservation techniques include fermenting fish and meat in the form of igunaq
- Labrador tea
- Suaasat: a traditional soup made from seal, whale, reindeer, or seabirds.

One common way to eat the meat hunted is frozen. Many hunters will eat the food that they hunt on location where they found it. This keeps their blood flowing and their bodies warm. One custom of eating meat at the hunting site pertains to fish. In Overland to Starvation Cove: A History, Heinrich Klutschak explains the custom: "...no fish could be eaten in a cooked state on the spot where caught but could only be enjoyed raw; only when one is a day's march away from the fishing site is it permitted to cook the fish over the flame of a blubber lamp."

Inuit eat only two main meals a day, but it is common to eat many snacks every hour. Customs among Inuit when eating and preparing food are very strict and may seem odd for people of different cultures.

When eating a meal, Inuit place large slabs of meat, blubber, and other parts of the animal on a piece of metal, plastic, or cardboard on the floor. From here, anyone in the house is able to cut off a piece of meat. At these meals, no one is obliged to join in the meal; Inuit eat only when hungry. Sometimes, though, meals are announced to the whole camp. A woman does this by the shout of "Ujuk!" which means "cooked meat".

After a hunt, the eating habits differ from normal meals. When a seal is brought home, the hunters quickly gather around it to receive their pieces of meat first. This happens because the hunters are the coldest and hungriest among the camp and need the warm seal blood and meat to warm them. The seal is cut in a specific way directly after a hunt. Borré explains the cutting of the seal in this way: "one of the hunters slits the abdomen laterally, exposing the internal organs. Hunters first eat pieces of liver or they use a tea cup to gather some blood to drink." At this time, hunters may also chop up pieces of fat and the brain to mix together and eat with meat.

Women and children are accustomed to eating different parts of the seal because they wait until the hunters are done eating. Intestines are the first thing to be chosen and then any leftover pieces of the liver are consumed. Finally, ribs and the backbone are eaten and any remaining meat is distributed among the camp.

=== Food sharing in the community ===
Inuit are known for their practice of food sharing, a form of food distribution where one person catches the food and shares with the entire community. Food sharing was first documented among the Inuit in 1910 when a little girl decided to take a platter around to four neighboring families who had no food of their own.

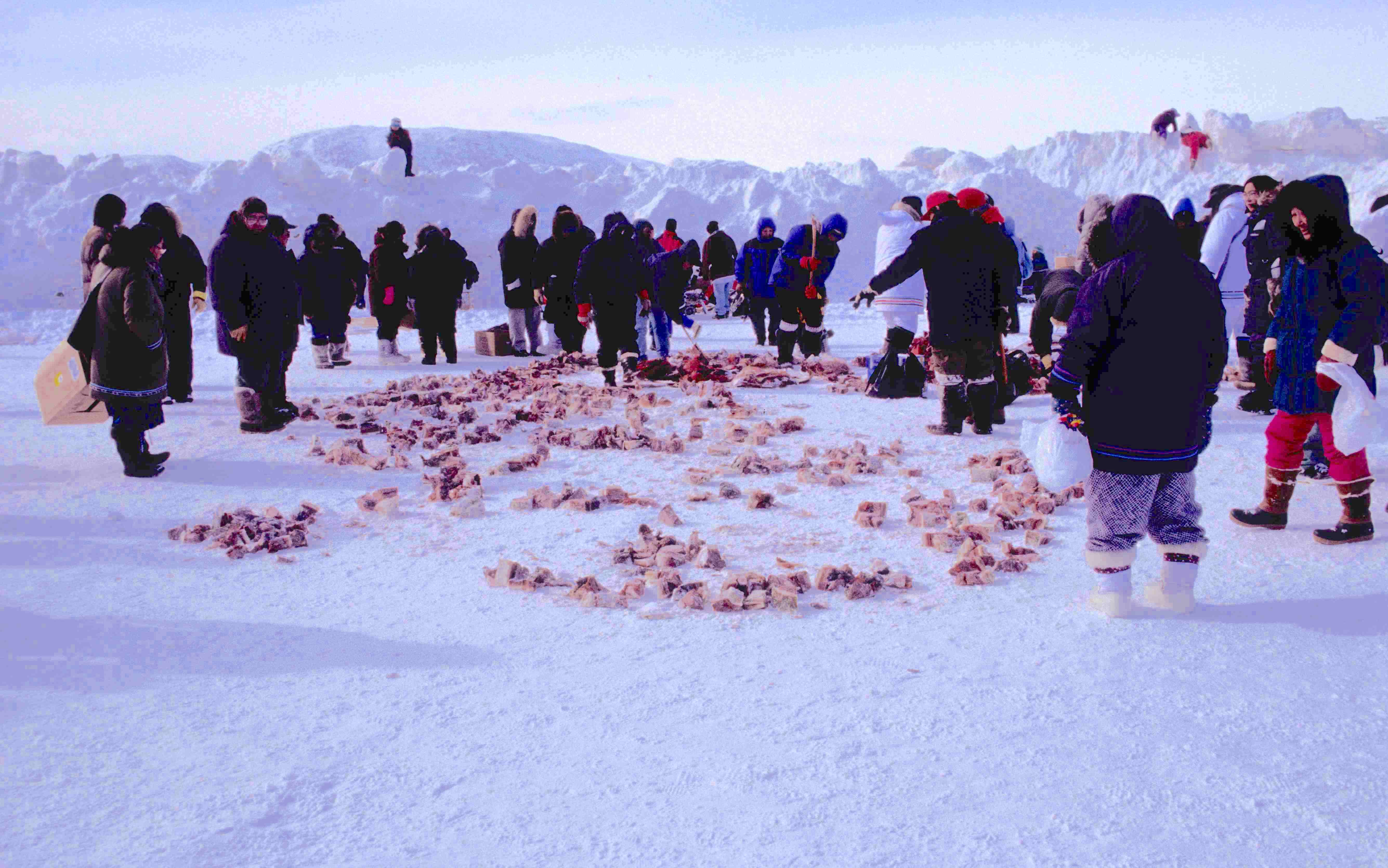
Sharing of frozen, aged walrus meat among Inuit families

According to Uqalurait: An Oral History of Nunavut, "food sharing was necessary for the physical and social welfare of the entire group." Younger couples would give food from their hunt to the elders, most often their parents, as a sign of respect. Food sharing was not only a tradition, but also a way for families to make bonds with one another. Once you shared food with someone, you were in a "lifelong partnership" with them.

Inuit often are relentless in making known that they are not like Qallunaat in the sense that they do not eat the same food and they are communal with their food. Qallunaat believe that the person who purchases the food is the owner of the food and is free to decide what happens to the food. Searles describes the Inuit perspective on food by saying that "in the Inuit world of goods, foods as well as other objects associated with hunting, fishing, and gathering are more or less communal property, belonging not to individuals but to a larger group, which can include multiple households." Food in an Inuit household is not meant to be saved for the family who has hunted, fished, gathered, or purchased it, but instead for anyone who is in need of it. Searles and his wife were visiting a family in Iqaluit and he asked for permission to have a cup of orange juice. This small gesture of asking was taken as offensive because Inuit do not consider food belonging to one person.

== Perceived benefits and beliefs of the diet ==
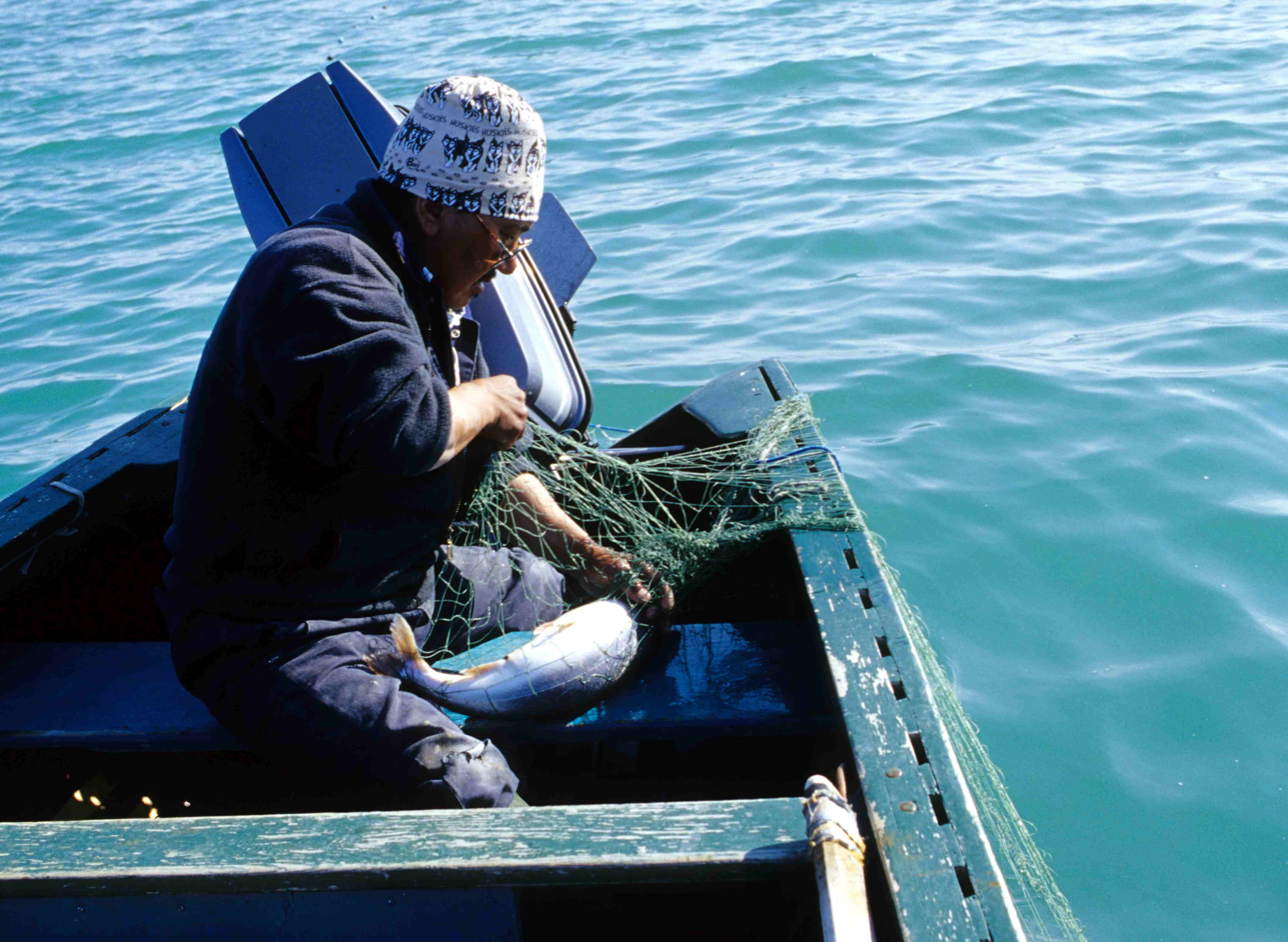
Arctic char fishing

The Inuit believe that their diet has many benefits over the western Qallunaat food. They believe that their diet will make one stronger, warmer, and full of energy.

One example is the drinking of seal blood. When interviewing an Inuk elder, Searles was told that "Inuit food generates a strong flow of blood, a condition considered to be healthy and indicative of a strong body." After the consumption of seal blood and meat, one could look at their veins in the wrist for proof of the strength that Inuit food provides. Borré states that "seal blood is seen as fortifying human blood by replacing depleted nutrients and rejuvenating the blood supply, it is considered a necessary part of the Inuit diet."

Inuit also believe that eating raw meat keeps them warmer and stronger. They say that raw meat takes effect on one's body when eaten consistently. One Inuk, Oleetoa, who ate a combination of "Qallunaat" and Inuit food, told of a story of his cousin Joanasee who ate a diet consisting of mostly raw Inuit food. The two compared their strengths, warmth, and energy and found that Joanasee benefited most based on his diet.

Inuit choose their diet based on four concepts, according to Borré: "the relationship between animals and humans, the relationship between the body and soul and life and health, the relationship between seal blood and Inuit blood, and diet choice." Inuit are especially spiritual when it comes to the customs of hunting, cooking, and eating. The Inuit belief is that the combination of animal and human blood in one's bloodstream creates a healthy human body and soul.

=== Hunting beliefs ===
A particularly strong belief held by the Inuit is about the relationship between seal and Inuit. According to Inuit hunters and elders, hunters and seals have an agreement that allows the hunter to capture and feed from the seal if only for the hunger of the hunter's family. Borré explains that through this alliance "both hunter and seal are believed to benefit: the hunter is able to sustain the life of his people by having a reliable source of food, and the seal, through its sacrifice, agrees to become part of the body of the Inuit."

Inuit are under the belief that if they do not follow the alliances that their ancestors have laid out, the animals will disappear because they have been offended and will cease to reproduce.

All saltwater animals, including seals, are considered to be always thirsty and are therefore offered a drink of fresh water as they die. This is shown as a sign of respect and gratitude toward the seal and its sacrifice. This offering is also done to please the spirit Sedna to ensure food supply.

=== Healing beliefs ===
Borré tells of a time when she saw an Inuk woman fall ill who blamed her sickness on the lack of seal in her diet. Once receiving seal meat, the woman felt better within hours and said that her quick recovery was due to the consumption of seal meat and blood. Borré experienced this many times among many different members of the group and they all attributed their sickness to the lack of Inuit food.

== See also ==
- List of diets
- No-carbohydrate diet
- Arctic vegetation
