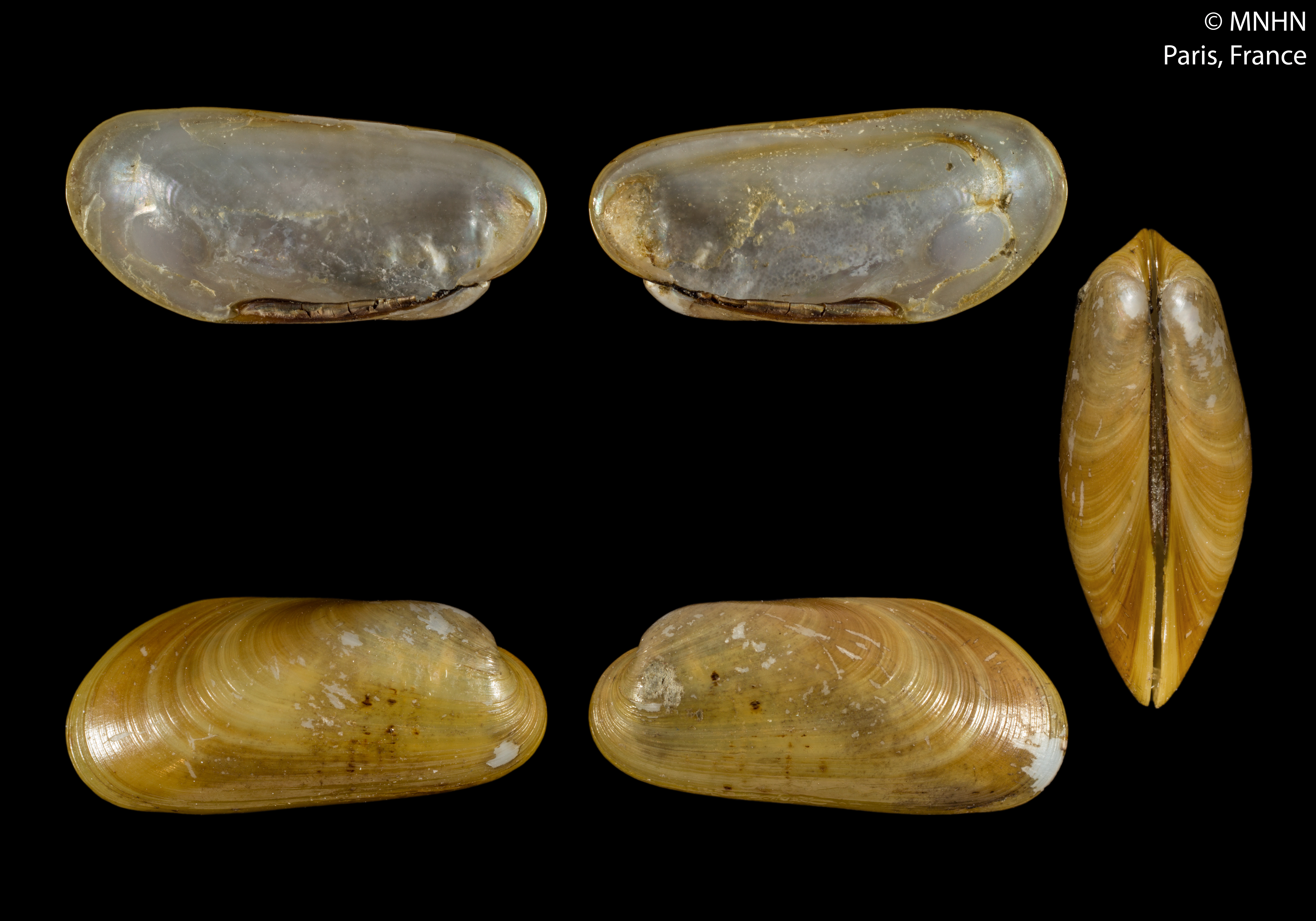
- Shell of Idas cylindricus (holotype at MNHN, Paris)

Scientific classification
- Kingdom: Animalia
- Phylum: Mollusca
- Class: Bivalvia
- Order: Mytilida
- Family: Mytilidae
- Genus: Idas; Jeffreys, 1876

Type species
- Idas argenteus Jeffreys, 1876

Synonyms
- Adipicola (Myrinopsis) F. Nordsieck, 1969; Habepegris F. R. Bernard, 1978; Idasola Iredale, 1915 (Unnecessary replacement name for Idas Jeffreys, 1876); Miridas Iredale, 1939

= Idas (bivalve) =

Genus of bivalves

Idas is a genus of saltwater clams, marine bivalve molluscs in the family Mytilidae, the mussels.

== Species ==
The World Register of Marine Species lists the following species:

- Idas argenteus Jeffreys, 1876
- Idas coppingeri (E. A. Smith, 1885)
- Idas cristiani Giusti, Mietto & Sbrana, 2012
- Idas cylindricus Pelorce & Poutiers, 2009
- Idas dalli E. A. Smith, 1885
- Idas emmae Giusti, Mietto & Sbrana, 2012
- Idas filippoi Giusti, Mietto & Sbrana, 2012
- Idas ghisottii Warén & Carrozza, 1990
- Idas indicus (E. A. Smith, 1904)
- Idas jaclinae Giusti, Mietto & Sbrana, 2012
- Idas japonicus (Habe, 1976)
- Idas lamellosus Verrill, 1882
- Idas macdonaldi Gustafson, R. D. Turner, Lutz & Vrijenhoek, 1998
- Idas modiolaeformis (Sturany, 1896)
- Idas olympicus Kiel & Goedaert, 2007 †
- Idas simpsoni (J. T. Marshall, 1900)
- Idas washingtonius (Bernard, 1978)
