= Suaasat =

Greenlandic soup

- Type: Soup
- Course: Main course
- Place of origin: Greenland
- Serving temperature: Hot
- Main ingredients: Meat (seal, whale, caribou, or seabirds), onions, potatoes, barley, salt, black pepper, bay leaves, water

Suaasat (Greenlandic pronunciation: [suaːsat]) is a traditional Greenlandic soup. It is traditionally made from seal meat, but can also be made from whale, caribou, or seabirds.

The soup often includes onions and potatoes and is simply seasoned with salt, black pepper, and bay leaves. The soup is often thickened with rice or by soaking barley in the water overnight so that the starches leach into the water.

== Sources ==
- Harlan Walker. Disappearing foods: studies in foods and dishes at risk: proceedings of the Oxford Symposium on Food and Cookery 1994. Proceedings of the Oxford Symposium on Food Series. Prospect, 1995. ISBN 0-907325-62-9, ISBN 978-0-907325-62-8. Pg 89
