= Greenland Brewhouse =

Greenland's first brewery

Coordinates: 60°54′47″N 46°3′3″W

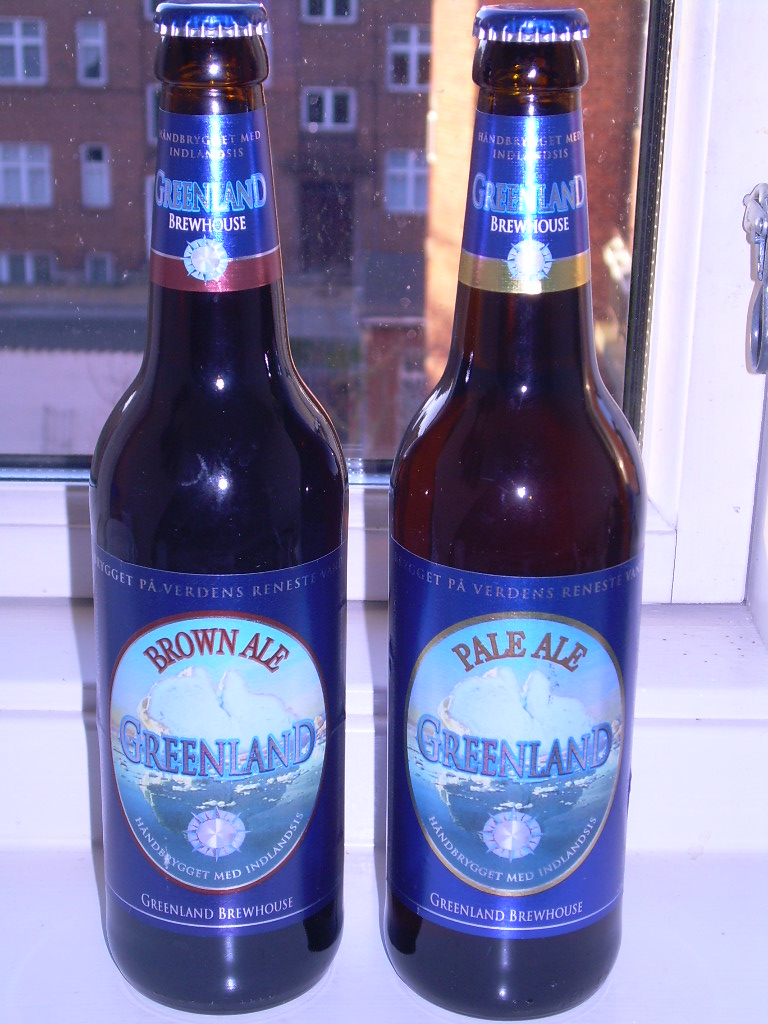
Greenland Brewhouse brown ale

Greenland Brewhouse was Greenland's first brewery. It was located in Narsaq in Southern Greenland and was founded in December 2004. The beer was brewed from water derived from melted icebergs. Melt water was collected from icebergs and transported to the brewery by local fishermen on their fishing boats. Greenland Brewhouse pioneered 'ice beer', brewed from 2000-year-old natural Arctic ice harvested from glaciers.

Prior to 1954, alcohol sales were heavily restricted in Greenland, thus home brewing presented problems.

== Bankruptcy ==
The microbrewery filed for bankruptcy in October 2008. A month later—in November 2008—the main shareholder, Greenland Ventures, decided against further investment in the company and the brewery was declared bankrupt. The main Greenlandic newspaper Sermitsiaq reported the brewery left behind four million kroner in debt.

== See also ==
- Godthaab Bryghus, in Nuuk, Greenland
- Icefiord Bryghus, in Ilulissat, Greenland
- Microbrewery
