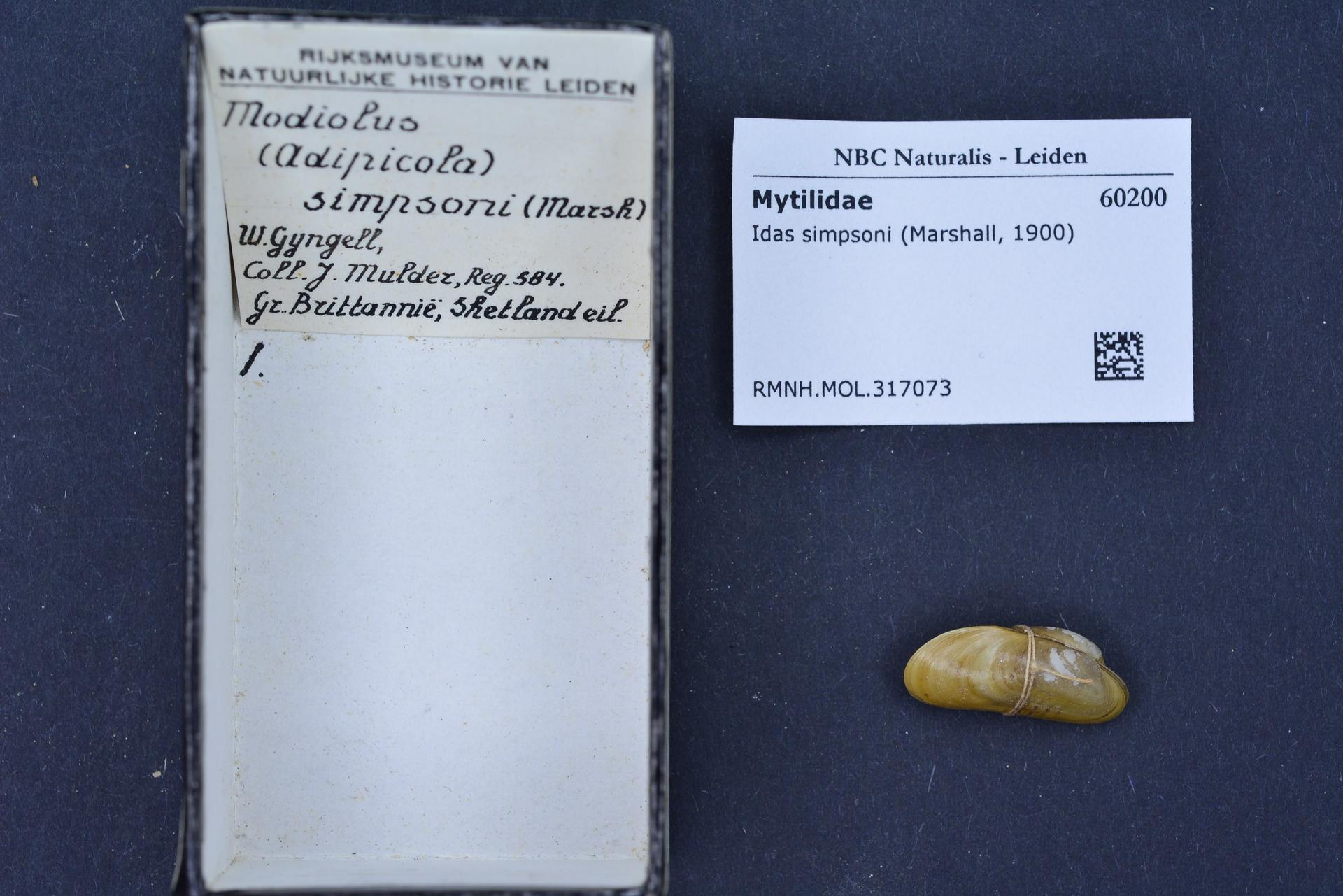
- Preserved specimen of Idas simpsoni

Scientific classification
- Domain: Eukaryota
- Kingdom: Animalia
- Phylum: Mollusca
- Class: Bivalvia
- Order: Mytilida
- Family: Mytilidae
- Genus: Idas
- Species: I. simpsoni

Binomial name
- Idas simpsoni (Marshall, 1900)

Synonyms
- Myrina simpsoni Marshall, 1900; Adipicola simpsoni (Marshall, 1900)

= Idas simpsoni =

Species of mollusc

Idas simpsoni, previously known as Adipicola simpsoni, is a species of saltwater clam, a marine bivalve mollusc in the family Mytilidae, the mussels. It is a deepwater species and is only found attached to the bones of dead whales.

== History ==
In 1900, some fishermen trawling the seabed between the Hebrides and the Shetland Islands brought to the surface part of a whale skull to which was attached about twenty bivalve molluscs. They passed their find to James Jenkins Simpson, a shell collector in Aberdeen, and he sent them on to the conchologist James Thomas Marshall. Marshall determined that the molluscs were new to science, and formally described them, naming the new species Myrina simpsoni. Apart from one specimen which was found inside a baulk of drifting pinewood, all specimens seen since then have been associated with the skeletons of dead whales, making this mollusc the first known species with such a restrictive habitat requirement. The species has since been transferred to the genus Idas, making it Idas simpsoni.

== Description ==
This mollusc can grow to a length of about 2 cm (0.8 in). The shell is equivalved, oblong and rather fragile, the posterior end being broad and rounded while the anterior end is narrower and more acutely pointed. The dorsal margin is flat and the hinge simple; the shell is embossed with fine concentric sculpturing. The exterior of the shell is grey and the interior is pearly.

== Ecology ==
A whale fall, the sinking of a dead whale carcase to the sea floor, creates a complex localized ecosystem that can supply sustenance to deep-sea organisms for long periods of time. Idas simpsoni is described as living in abundance on weathered whale skulls.
