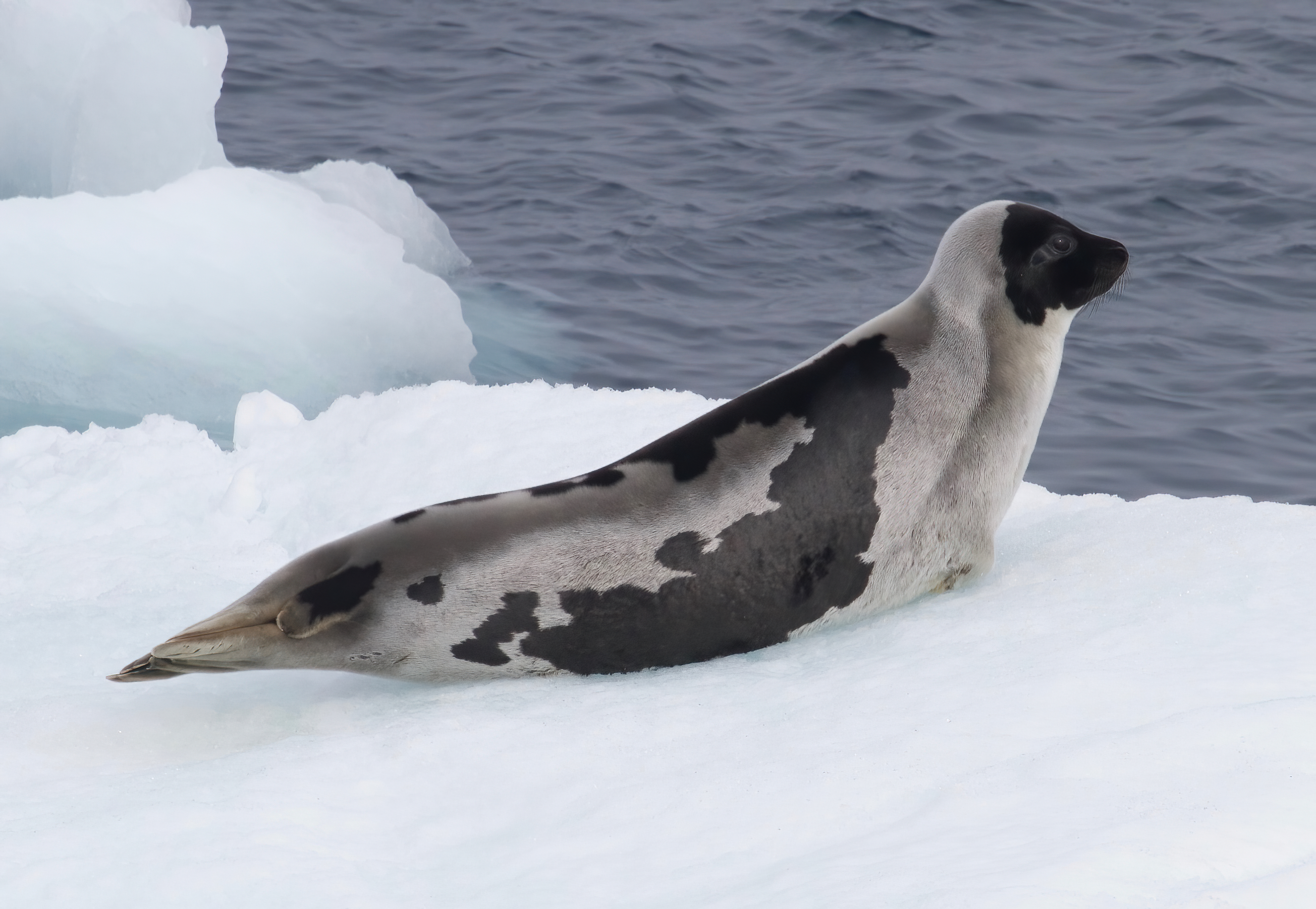

Conservation status
- Near Threatened (IUCN 3.1)
- CITES Appendix III

Scientific classification
- Kingdom: Animalia
- Phylum: Chordata
- Class: Mammalia
- Order: Carnivora
- Parvorder: Pinnipedia
- Family: Phocidae
- Subfamily: Phocinae
- Tribe: Phocini
- Genus: Pagophilus; Gray, 1844
- Species: P. groenlandicus

Binomial name
- Pagophilus groenlandicus (Erxleben, 1777)

Synonyms
- Phoca groenlandica

= Harp seal =

Species of mammal

The harp seal (Pagophilus groenlandicus), also known as the saddleback seal or Greenland seal, is a species of earless seal, or true seal, native to the northernmost Atlantic Ocean and Arctic Ocean. Originally in the genus Phoca with a number of other species, it was reclassified into the monotypic genus Pagophilus in 1844. In Greek, its scientific name translates to "Greenlandic ice-lover", and its taxonomic synonym, Phoca groenlandica translates to "Greenlandic seal".

== Description ==
Pagophilus groenladicus skeleton and skull
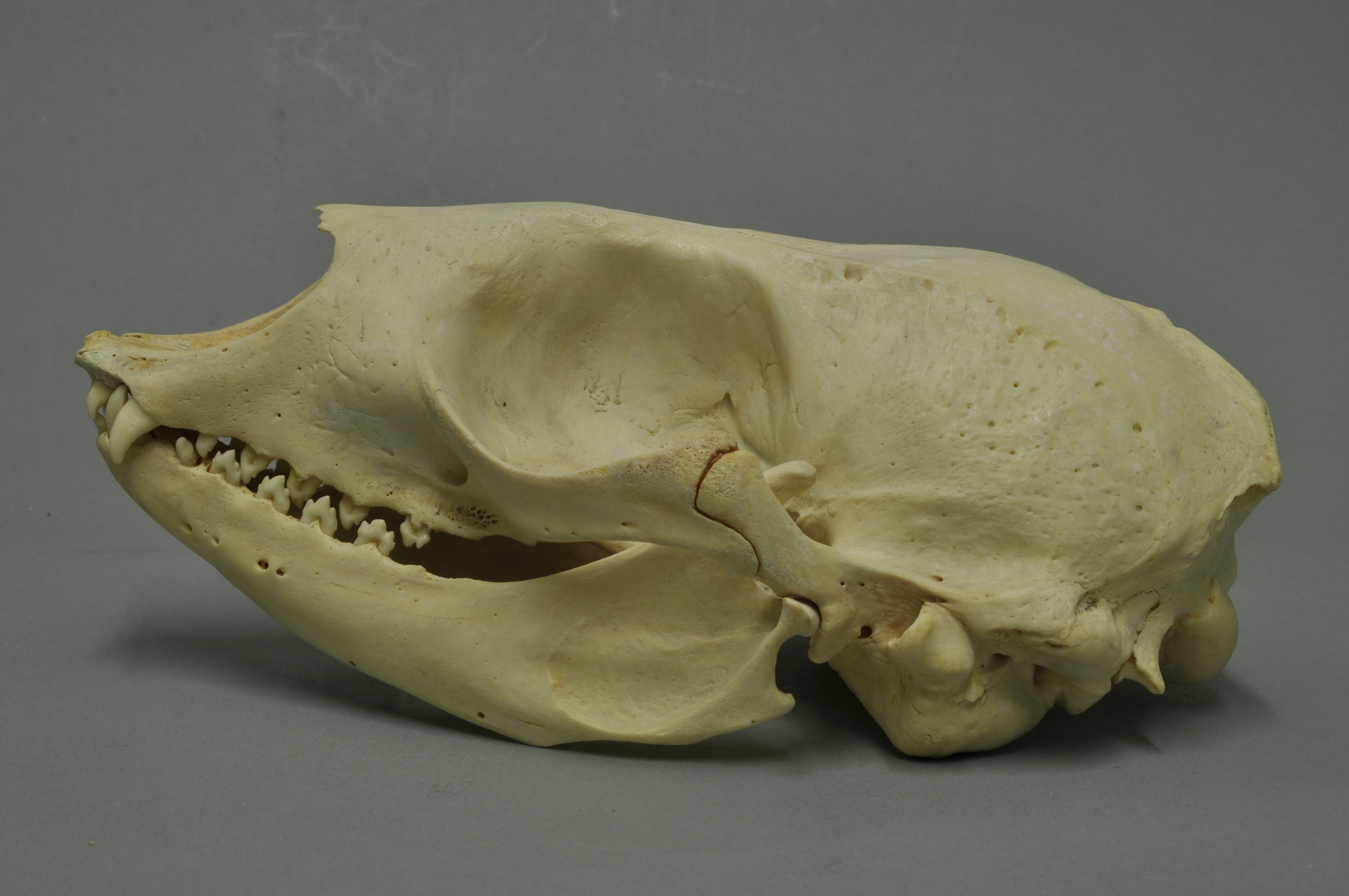

The mature harp seal has pure black eyes. It has a silver-grey fur covering its body, with black harp- or wishbone-shaped markings dorsally, accounting for its common name. Adult harp seals grow to be 1.7 to 2.0 m (5 ft 7 in to 6 ft 7 in) long and weigh from 115 to 140 kg (254 to 309 lb). The harp seal pup has a white coat for the first 2–3 weeks until the first moult, when it is replaced by a black-dotted silver to grey coat. Pups acquire their characteristic pattern once they near sexual maturity. In males, the transition to the harp-pattern tends to be abrupt, while in females it may be gradual and span years. Some females may never lose all their spots or not fully develop the harp-pattern. Harp seals show little sexual dimorphism in size, with males being slightly larger.

=== Physiology ===
The harp seal is a modest diver. Dive depth varies with season, time of day and location. In the Greenland Sea sub-population, the average dive rate is around 8.3 dives per hour and dives range from a depth of less than 20 m (66 ft) to over 500 m (1,600 ft). Dive duration ranges from less than two minutes to just over 20 minutes. During the spring and summer when seals forage along the pack ice in the Greenland Sea, most dives are less than 50 m (160 ft). In the late fall and winter, dive depth has been found to increase, particularly in the Denmark Strait, where the mean dive depth was found to be 141 m (463 ft).

Lactating female harp seals spend about 80% of the time in the water and 20% of the time on the fast ice, weaning or staying near their pups. However, almost half of the time spent in the water is at the surface, well beyond what is expected to recover from dives. This behaviour allows the mother harp seal to conserve energy and avoid the harsh conditions of the fast-ice while remaining near her pup. As with most phocids, she requires vast amounts of energy to ensure sufficient mass transfer to her growing, weaning pup. Harp seals remain within their aerobic dive limit for 99% of dives.

==== Thermoregulation ====
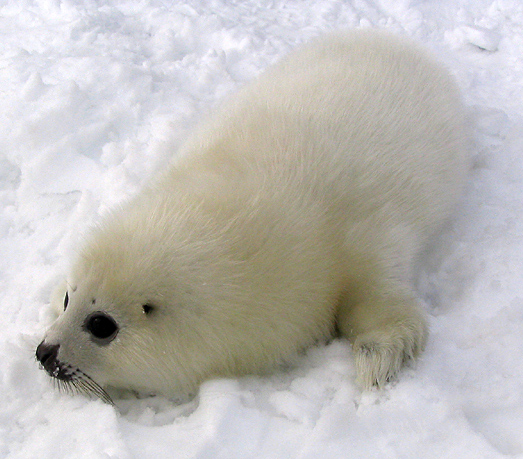
Whitecoated pup.

Harp seal insulation changes over the course of a seal's lifetime. Young harp seals rely on a lanugo pelt from nursing all the way up to their weaning age. The insulating quality of this fur depends on its ability to keep a layer of air trapped inside or between the hairs. It takes a year for their blubber to develop and for their first-year pelage to grow. This transition from thick lanugo fur to blubber is important because lanugo fur does not insulate well in water. Adult harp seals primarily use blubber for insulation.

Harp seals combine anatomical and behavioural approaches to managing their body temperatures, instead of elevating their metabolic rate and subsequently their energy requirements. Their lower critical temperature is believed to be under −10 °C (14 °F) in air. A thick coat of blubber insulates the seal's body and provides energy when food is scarce or during fasting. Blubber also streamlines its body for more efficient swimming. Brown fat warms blood as it returns from the body surface as well as providing energy, most importantly for newly weaned pups. This blubber insulates the harp seal's core but does not insulate the flippers to the same extent. Instead, the flippers have circulatory adaptations to help prevent heat loss. Flippers act as heat exchangers, warming or cooling the seal as needed. On ice, the seal can press its fore flippers to its body and its hind flippers together to reduce heat loss.

Harp seals can also redirect blood flow from the periphery to minimize heat loss; their nostrils and eyes are adapted to conserve heat, possessing a countercurrent heat exchange system and retia mirabile, respectively.

==== Senses ====
The harp seal's eyes are large for its body size and contain a large spherical lens that improves focusing ability. Its mobile pupil helps it adapt to the intense glare of the Arctic ice. Its retina is rod-dominated and backed by a cat-like and reflective tapetum lucidum, enhancing its low light sensitivity. Its cornea is lubricated by lachrymal glands, to protect the eye from sea water damage.

On ice, the mother identifies her offspring by smell. This sense may also warn of an approaching predator. Underwater, the seal closes its nostrils, disabling its sense of smell.

Its whiskers, or vibrissae, lie in horizontal rows on either side of its snout. They can sense to low-frequency vibrations, and may be able to detect movement of nearby animals during dives.

=== Diet ===
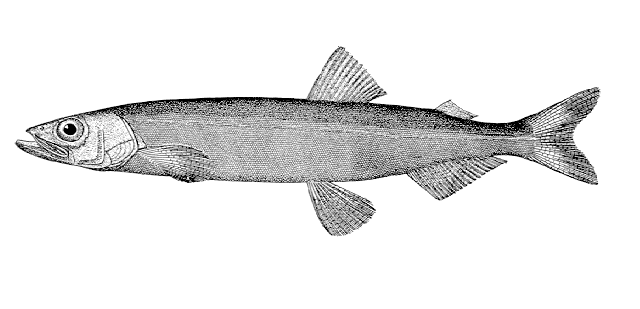
Capelin

Like most pinnipeds, harp seals are carnivorous. They have a diverse diet including several dozen fish and invertebrate species. The White Sea population migrates northward in the summer to forage extensively in the Barents Sea. Common prey items include krill, capelin (Mallotus villosus), herring (such as Clupea harengus), flat fish, and gadiform fish, such as various species of cod. Harp seals prefer some prey, though their diet depends largely on prey abundance. Diet and abundance analysis of the Svalbard population found that this population predominantly eats krill, followed closely by polar cod (Arctogladus glacialis). Barents Sea harp seals eat mostly herring and polar cod but less krill or amphipods, likely because these seals usually dive deeper than such prey.

Western North Atlantic harp seals forage both near and offshore of Newfoundland, most preferring such prey as Arctic cod (Boreogadus saida), capelin, Greenland halibut (Reinhardtius hippoglossoides) and American plaice (Hippoglossoides platessoides). As in other populations and foraging areas, diet varies with distance from shore, with arctic cod comprising more of it nearshore and capelin more of it offshore. However, capelin is the preferred prey in both locales.

== Life history ==
Harp seals spend relatively little time on land compared with time at sea. They are social animals and can be quite vocal in groups. Within their large colonies, smaller groups with their own hierarchies form. Groups of several thousand form during pupping and mating season. Harp seals can live over 30 years in the wild. On the ice, pups call their mothers by "yelling", and "mumble" while playing with other pups. Adults "growl" and "warble" to warn off conspecifics and predators. Underwater, adults have been recorded using more than 19 types of vocalization during courting and mating.

=== Reproduction and development ===
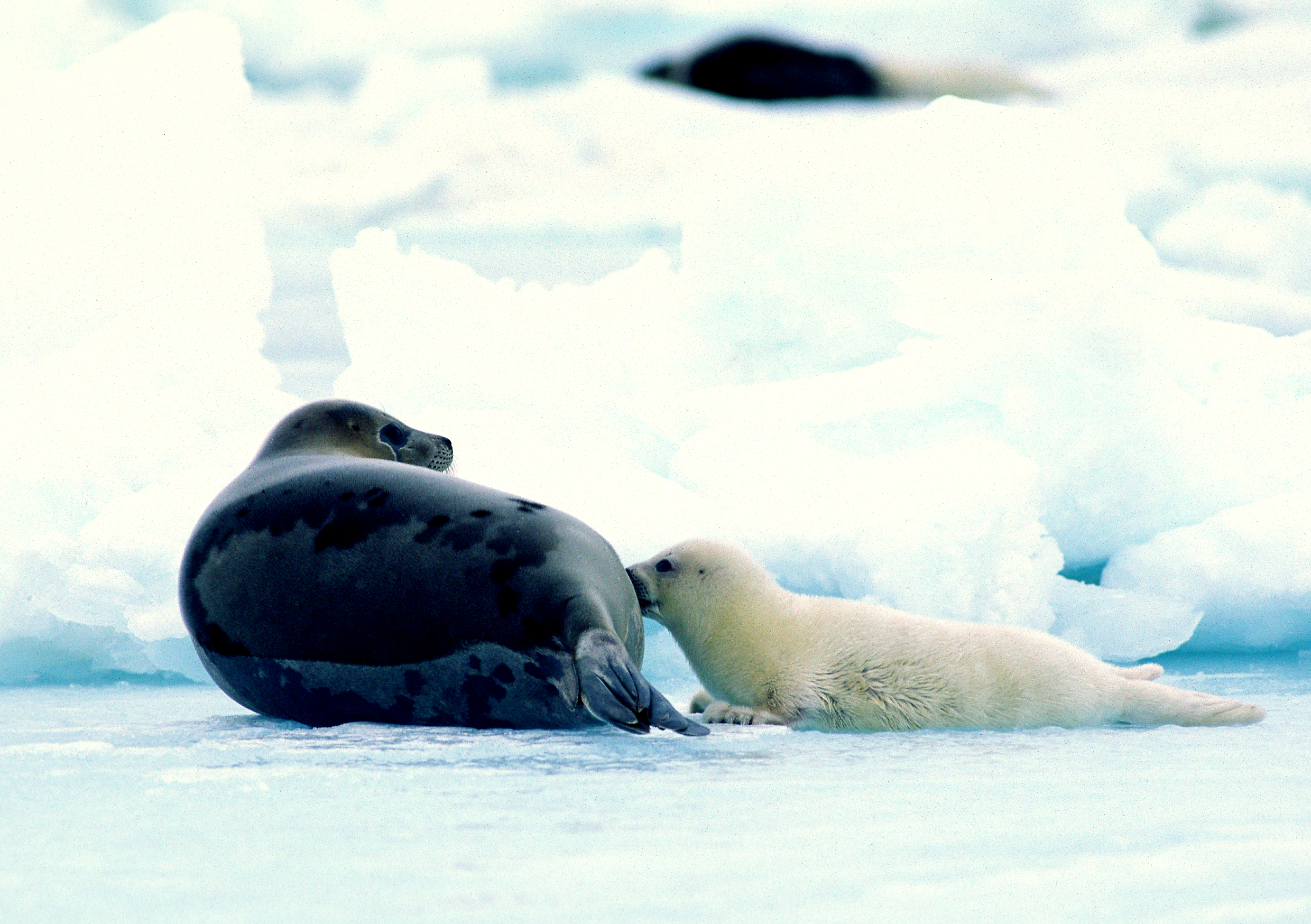
Nursing

The harp seal is a fast ice breeder and is believed to have a promiscuous mating system. Breeding occurs between mid-February and April. While courtship starts on the ice, mating usually takes place in the water. Courtship peaks during mid-March and involves males performing underwater displays, using bubbles, vocalizations, and paw movements to court females. Females, who remain on the ice, will resist copulation unless underwater.

Females become sexually mature between ages five to six. Annually thereafter, they may bear one pup, usually in late February. The gestation period lasts about 11.5 months, with a fetal development phase of 8 months. There have been reported cases of twin births, but singletons are vastly more common. The fertilized egg grows into an embryo which remains suspended in the womb for up to three months before implantation, to delay birth until sufficient pack ice is available.

Harp seal births are rapid, with recorded lengths as short as 15 seconds in duration. In order to cope with the shock of a rapid change in environmental temperature and undeveloped blubber layers, the pup relies on solar heating, and behavioural responses such as shivering or seeking warmth in the shade or even water.

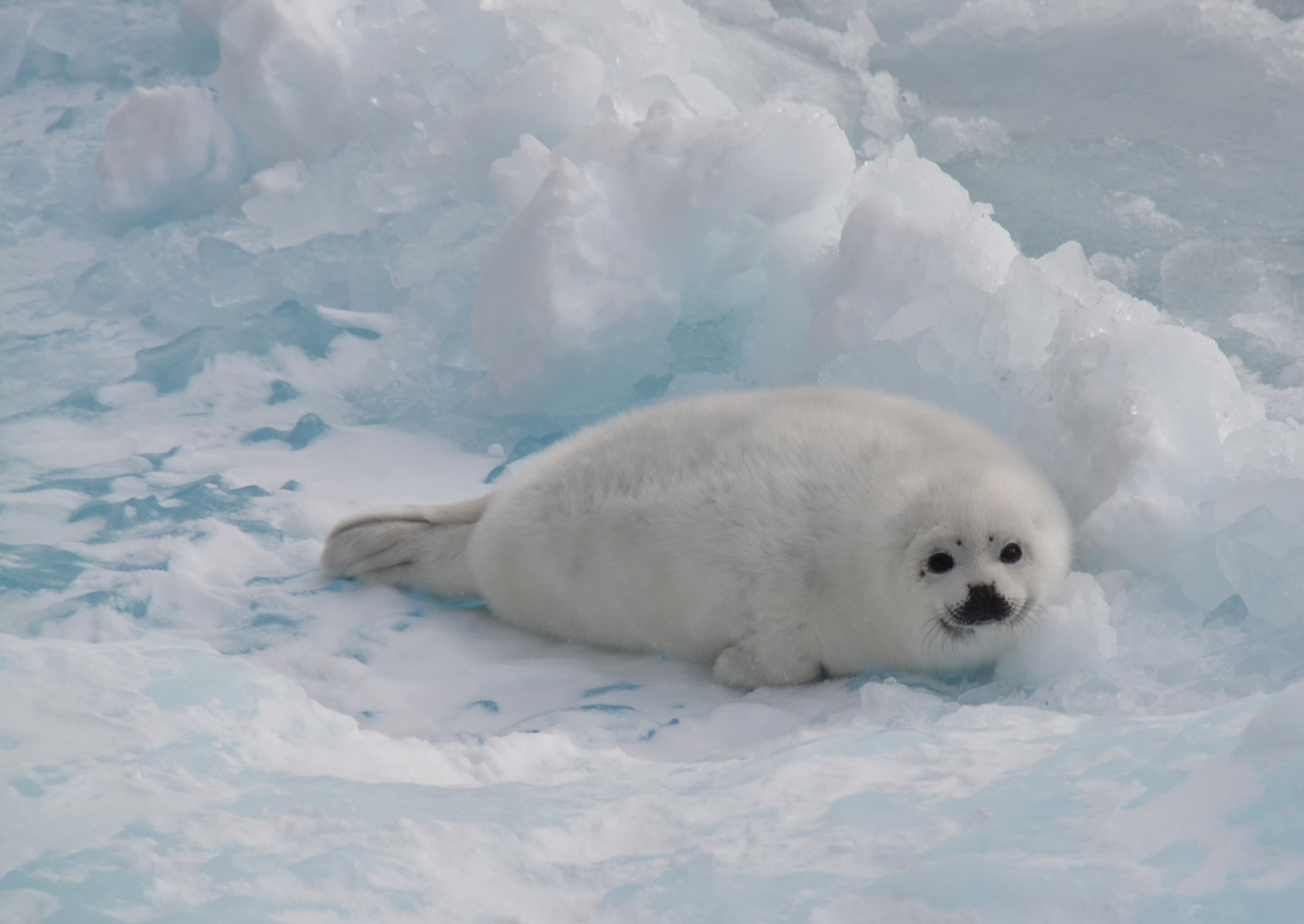
A weaned harp seal pup

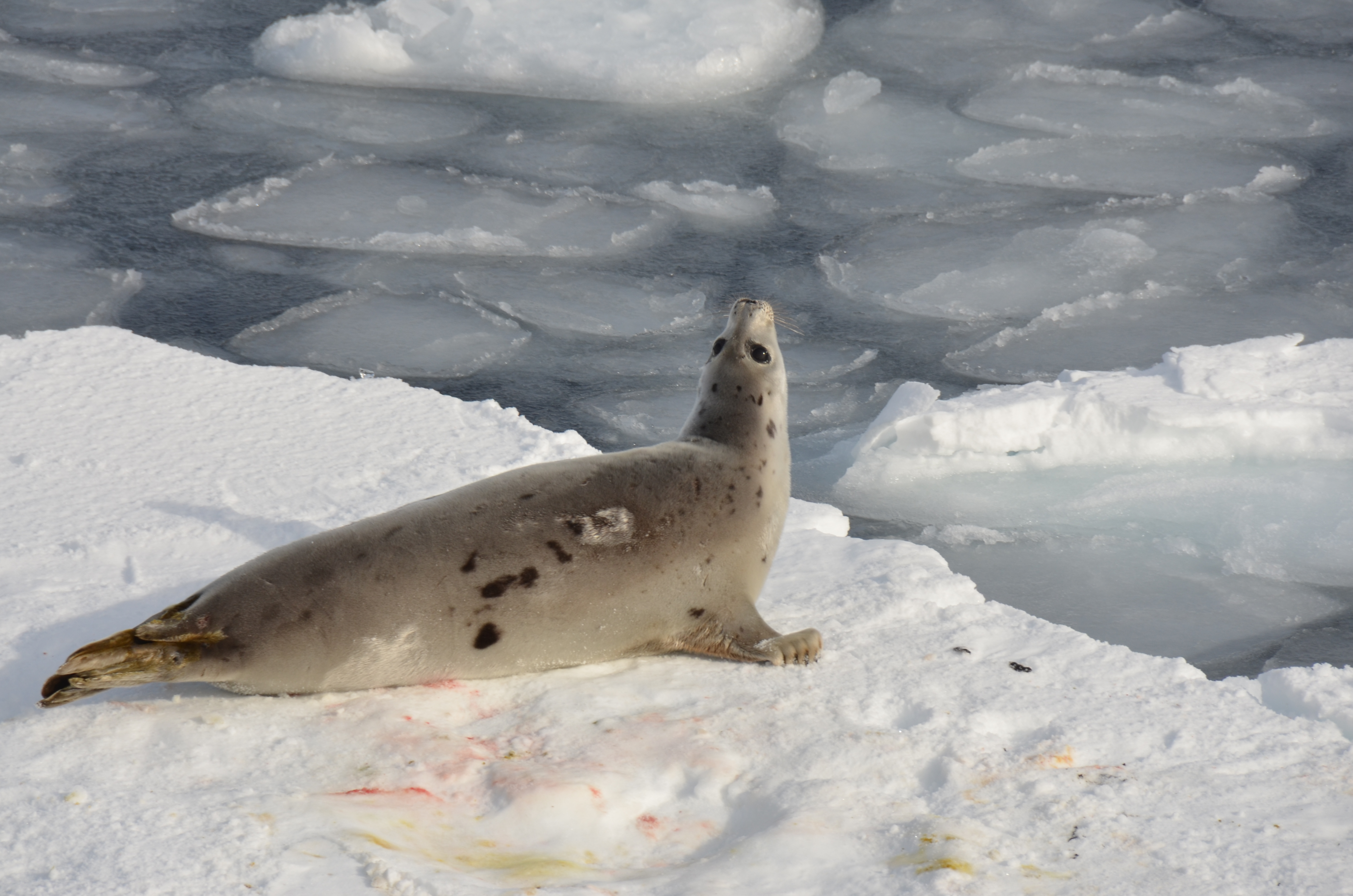
Juvenile harp seal—a "bedlamer"

Newborn pups weigh 11 kilograms (24 lb) on average and are 80–85 cm (31–33 in) long. After birth, the mother feeds only her own pup. During the approximately 12-day long nursing period, the mother does not hunt, and loses up to 3 kilograms (6.6 lb) per day. Harp seal milk initially contains 25% fat (this number increases to 40% by weaning as the mother fasts) and pups gain over 2.2 kilograms (4.9 lb) per day while nursing, quickly thickening their blubber layer. During this time, the juvenile's "greycoat" grows in beneath the white neonatal coat, and the pup increases its weight to 36 kg (79 lb). Weaning is abrupt; the mother swiftly turns from nursing to promiscuous mating, leaving the pup behind on the ice. In the post-weaning phase (after abandonment), the pup becomes sedentary to conserve body fat. Within a few days, it sheds its white coat, reaching the "beater" stage. This name comes from the sound a beater's tail makes as the seal learns to swim. Pups begin to feed at 4 weeks of age, but still draw on internal sources of energy, relying first on energy stored in the body core rather than blubber. This fast can reduce their weight up to 50%. As many as 30% of pups die during their first year, due in part to their early immobility on land. During this time the ice begins to melt, leaving them vulnerable to polar bears and marine predators such as killer whales and Greenland sharks.

Around 13–14 months old, the pups moult again, becoming "bedlamers". Juveniles moult several times, producing a "spotted harp", before the male adults' harp-marked pelt fully emerges after several years. In females, it may not emerge.

Seals congregate annually on the ice to moult, pup and breed before migrating to summer feeding grounds. Their lifespan can be over 30 years.

== Population and distribution ==
Global harp seal population estimates total around 4.5 million individuals. Due to their dependence on pack ice for breeding, the harp seal range is restricted to areas where pack ice forms seasonally. The western North Atlantic stock or population, which is the largest, is located off eastern Canada. This population is further divided into two separate "herds" based on the breeding location. The Front herd breeds off the coast of Labrador and Newfoundland, and the Gulf herd breeds near the Magdalen Islands in the middle of the Gulf of St. Lawrence. A second stock breeds on the "West Ice" off eastern Greenland. A third stock breeds on the "East Ice" in the White Sea, which is off the north coast of Russia below the Barents Sea. Breeding occurs between mid-February and April, and varies somewhat for each stock. The three stocks are allopatric and do not interbreed. Some individuals from the Greenland Sea sub-population have been observed to forage in the Barents Sea alongside the White Sea sub-population during late summer and fall.

As of 2017 the number of pups born in the traditional pupping area of the southern Gulf of St. Lawrence was greatly reduced, with an estimated pup production of only 18,300 (95% confidence interval (CI), 15,400–21,200 rounded to the nearest hundred). Another 13,600 (95% CI, 7,700–19,500) pups were born in the northern Gulf. An estimated 714,600 (95% CI, 538,800–890,400) pups were born off the northeastern coast of Newfoundland (Front); accounting for 96% of all pupping. Combining the estimates from all areas resulted in an estimated total pup production of 746,500 (95% CI, 570,300–922,700).

There are two recognised subspecies:

Image	Subspecies	Distribution
	Pagophilus groenlandicus groenlandicus	Eastern Canada to Norway
	Pagophilus groenlandicus oceanicus	White and Barents seas

=== Migration and vagrancy ===
Harp seals are strongly migratory: the northwest population regularly moves up to 4,000 kilometres (2,500 mi) northeast outside of the breeding season, and one individual was located off the north Norwegian coast, 4,640 kilometres (2,880 mi) east northeast of its tagging location. Their navigational accuracy is high, with good eyesight an important factor. They are occasionally found as vagrants south of their normal range. In Great Britain, a total of 31 vagrants were recorded between 1800 and 1988.

Harp seals reached Lindisfarne in Northumberland in September 1995, and the Shetland Islands in 1987. The latter was linked to a mass movement of harp seals into Norwegian waters; by mid-February 1987, 24,000 were reported drowned in fishing nets and perhaps 30,000 (about 10% of the world population) had invaded fjords as far south as Oslo. The animals were emaciated, likely due to commercial fishing causing competition for the seals' prey.

Harp seals can strand on Atlantic coasts, often in warmer months, due to dehydration and parasite load. In March 2020, a harp seal was seen near Salvo, North Carolina. Harp seals often consume snow to stay hydrated, but may not have enough available during mild winters. Several centers are active in seal rescue and rehabilitation, including IFAW, NOAA, and the New England Aquarium. Harp seals are protected by the Marine Mammal Protection Act in the United States.

== Sealing ==
All three populations are hunted commercially, mainly by Canada, Norway, Russia and Greenland.

In Canada, commercial hunting season is from 15 November to 15 May. Most sealing occurs in late March in the Gulf of St. Lawrence, and during the first or second week of April off Newfoundland, in an area known as "the Front". This peak spring period is generally what is referred to as the "Canadian seal hunt". Hunting Canadian whitecoats has been banned since 1987. Since 2000, harp seals that are targeted during the hunt are often found to be "beaters" less than a year old. In 2006, the St. Lawrence hunt officially started on 25 March due to thin ice caused by the year's milder temperatures. Inuit living in the region hunt mainly for food and, to a lesser extent, commerce.

In 2019, the Department of Fisheries and Oceans estimated sustainable harvest levels for the next five years. The identified annual Canadian Total Allowable Catch (TAC) levels were 425,000 assuming harvest age structures of 95% young of the year (YOY). In 2016, 66,800 harp seals and 1,612 grey seals were harvested in Atlantic Canada.

In 2005, the Independent Veterinarians' Working Group (IVWG) recommended a three-step process for hunters to kill the seals with little or no pain for the seals, as long as the process is completed in rapid succession. The process is as follows:

1. Stun the seal on the head using tools, such as a rifle or a club, to immediately kill the animal or cause it to permanently lose consciousness.
2. Ensure that step 1 was completed correctly, and the skull is irreversibly damaged.
3. Cut the axillary arteries along both armpits and cut along the belly to prevent blood from reaching the brain, confirming its death.

In 2009, this process was included in both the 'Conditions of License' for the Canadian hunt as well as the Canadian Marine Mammal Regulations.

The Canadian seal hunt is monitored by the Canadian government. Although approximately 70% of the hunt occurs on the Front, most private monitors focus on the St. Lawrence hunt, due to its more convenient location.

The annual quota off the coast of Greenland for 2017–2019 was set at 26,000 1+ animals, where two pups are equivalent to removing one 1+ animal. The total catches of harp seals were 2000 (including 1934 pups) in 2017, 2703 (including 1218 pups) in 2018, and 5813 (including 2168 pups) in 2019.

The 2004 West Ice total allowable catch (TAC) was 15,000, almost double the sustainable catch of 8,200. Actual catches were 9,895 in 2004 and 5,808 in 2005. The 2004 White Sea TAC was 45,000. The catch was 22,474.

=== Impact on populations ===
Hunting has tremendously affected the population size of harp seals. Over the past 150 years, the harp seal population has fluctuated from over 9 million to as little as 1 million. The current population is estimated to be around 4.5 million or less. The Northwest Atlantic populations was found to have decreased by at least 50 percent from 1952 to 1970 but restriction of the hunt by quotas and other restrictions has led to some recovery.

Sealing

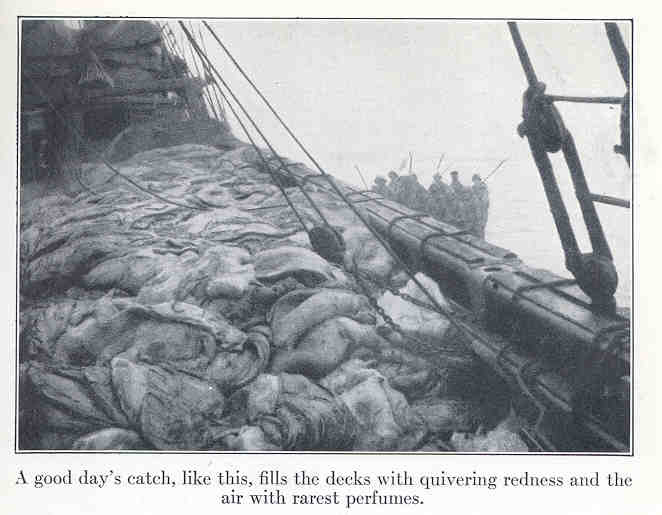
Sealing ship off Newfoundland with a haul of dead harp seals

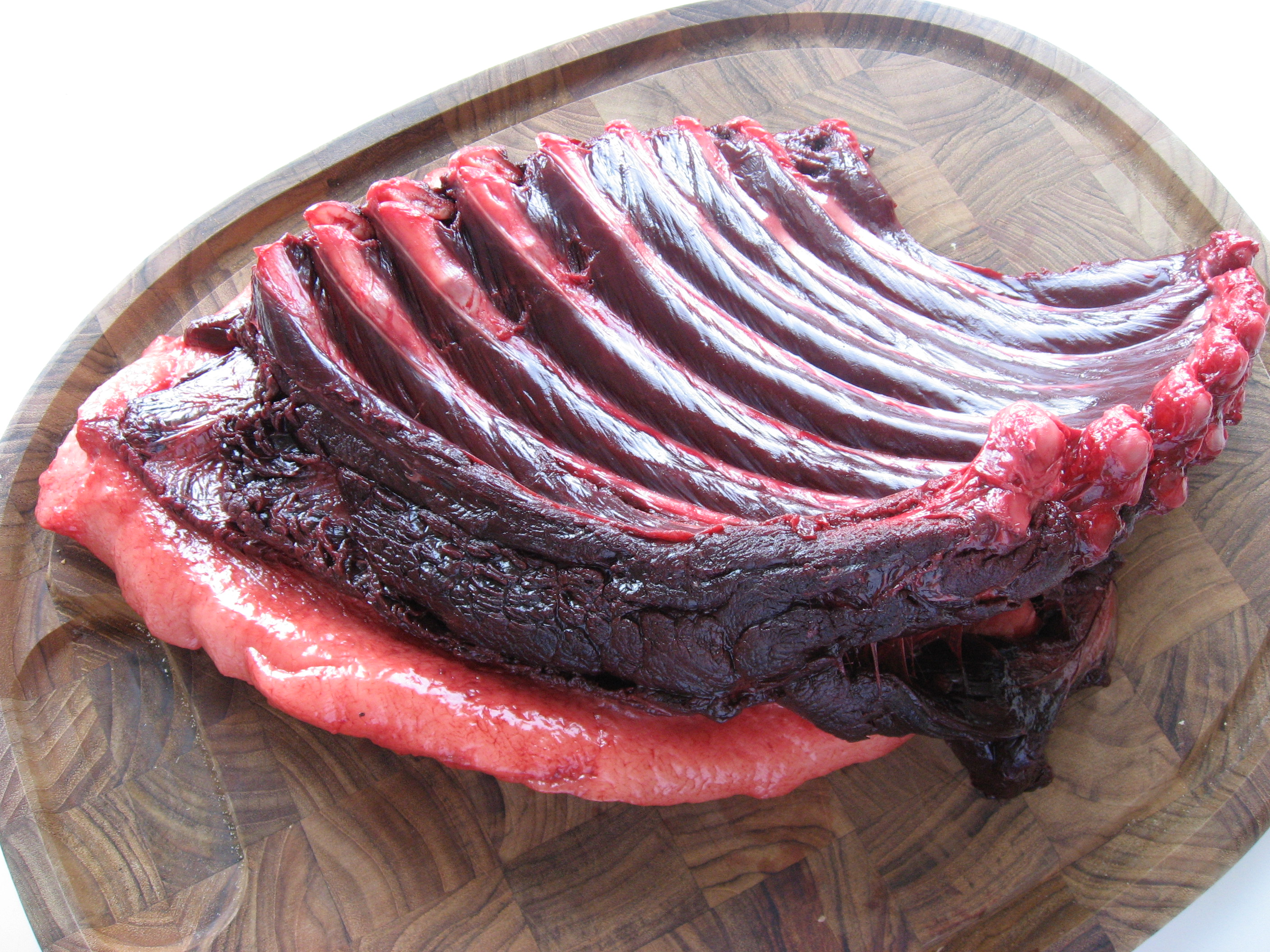
Harp seal ribs, Upernavik

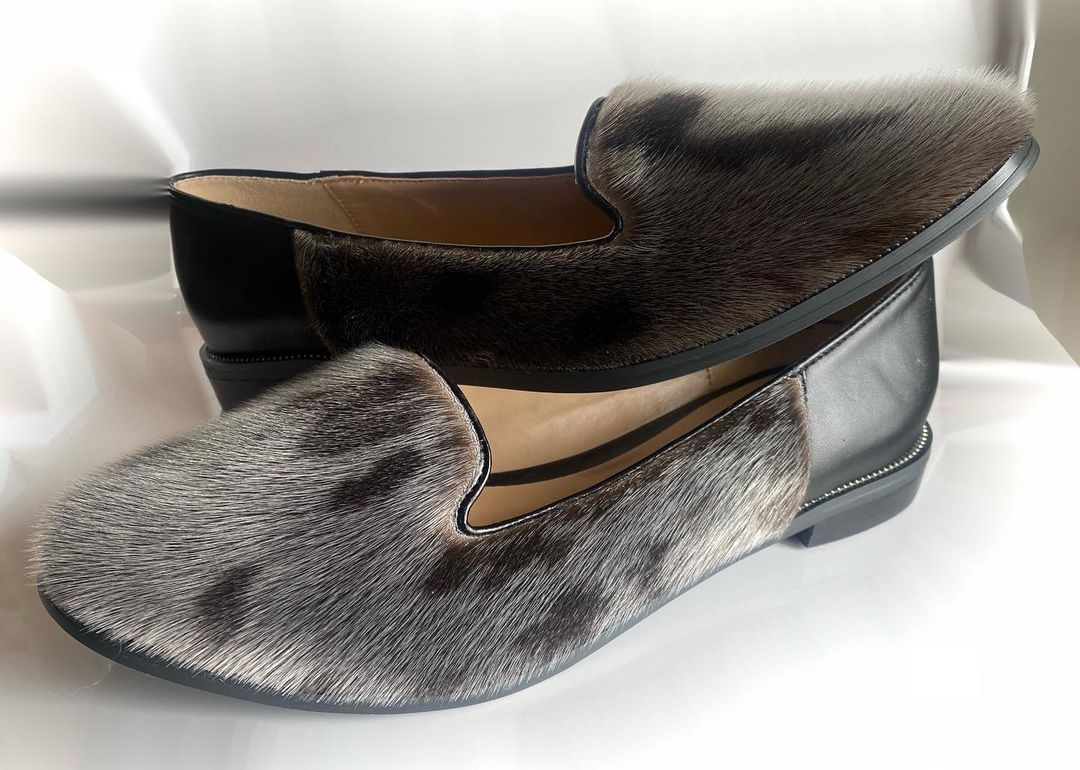
Flats with harp seal fur

== See also ==
- Paro, a medical robot pet based on the harp seal
