= Chefornak, Alaska =

Chefornak Cevvʼarneq / Caputnguaq
- City
- Chefornak in August 2023

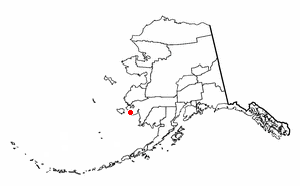
- Location of Chefornak, Alaska
- Coordinates: 60°9′33″N 164°16′10″W
- Country: United States
- State: Alaska
- Census Area: Bethel
- Incorporated: 1974

Government
  - Mayor: Robert Jimmy
  - State senator: Lyman Hoffman (D)
  - State rep.: Conrad McCormick (D)

Area
  - Total: 5.99 sq mi (15.51 km^{2})
  - Land: 5.24 sq mi (13.56 km^{2})
  - Water: 0.75 sq mi (1.95 km^{2})
- Elevation: 0 ft (0 m)

Population (2020)
  - Total: 506
  - Density: 96.6/sq mi (37.31/km^{2})
- Time zone: UTC-9 (Alaska (AKST))
  - Summer (DST): UTC-8 (AKDT)
- ZIP code: 99561
- Area code: 907
- FIPS code: 02-12680
- GNIS feature ID: 1400188

Chefornak (Central Yupik: Cevvʼarneq) is a rural city in Bethel Census Area, Alaska, United States. As of the 2020 census, Chefornak had a population of 506.

== Geography ==
Chefornak is located at 60°9′33″N 164°16′10″W (60.159070, -164.269437) on the south bank of the Kinia River, 16 miles (26 km) upriver from its mouth in Etolin Strait, an arm of the Bering Sea. The town is within the Yukon Delta National Wildlife Refuge.

According to the United States Census Bureau, the city has a total area of 6.4 square miles (16.6 km^{2}), of which 5.7 square miles (14.8 km^{2}) is land and 0.66 square miles (1.7 km^{2}), or 10.56%, is water.

== Local geology ==
Located in a region where the arctic tundra meets and interacts with the Bering Sea, as well as being in a region impacted by past volcanism, Chefornak is home to several landmarks.

An extinct volcano, Tern Mountain, is visible in the distance to the south. Large, blocky, igneous rocks are a common sight in the village and the surrounding tundra.

The Kinia River (Urrsukvaaq) and its many tributaries are important to the people of the village, because of water travel to hunting and fishing areas, as well as because of difficulties presented by flooding and erosion.

== Demographics ==
Historical population
Census	Pop.	Note	%±
1950	106		—
1960	133		25.5%
1970	146		9.8%
1980	230		57.5%
1990	320		39.1%
2000	394		23.1%
2010	418		6.1%
2020	506		21.1%
U.S. Decennial Census

Chefornak first appeared on the 1950 U.S. Census as an unincorporated village. It formally incorporated in 1974.

=== 2020 census ===
As of the 2020 census, Chefornak had a population of 506. The median age was 24.1 years. 39.7% of residents were under the age of 18 and 7.3% of residents were 65 years of age or older. For every 100 females there were 111.7 males, and for every 100 females age 18 and over there were 125.9 males age 18 and over.

0.0% of residents lived in urban areas, while 100.0% lived in rural areas.

There were 104 households in Chefornak, of which 70.2% had children under the age of 18 living in them. Of all households, 54.8% were married-couple households, 20.2% were households with a male householder and no spouse or partner present, and 18.3% were households with a female householder and no spouse or partner present. About 9.6% of all households were made up of individuals and 1.9% had someone living alone who was 65 years of age or older.

There were 110 housing units, of which 5.5% were vacant. The homeowner vacancy rate was 0.0% and the rental vacancy rate was 0.0%.

Racial composition as of the 2020 census
Race	Number	Percent
White	17	3.4%
Black or African American	0	0.0%
American Indian and Alaska Native	460	90.9%
Asian	0	0.0%
Native Hawaiian and Other Pacific Islander	0	0.0%
Some other race	0	0.0%
Two or more races	29	5.7%
Hispanic or Latino (of any race)	2	0.4%

=== 2000 census ===
As of the census of 2000, there were 394 people, 75 households, and 63 families residing in the city. The population density was 68.8 inhabitants per square mile (26.6/km^{2}). There were 82 housing units at an average density of 14.3 units per square mile (5.5 units/km^{2}). The racial makeup of the city was 93.40% Alaska Native, 2.03% White, and 4.57% from two or more races.

There were 75 households, out of which 60.0% had children under the age of 18 living with them, 61.3% were married couples living together, 13.3% had a female householder with no husband present, and 16.0% were non-families. 14.7% of all households were made up of individuals, and none had someone living alone who was 65 years of age or older. The average household size was 5.25 and the average family size was 5.98.

In the city, the age distribution of the population shows 45.2% under the age of 18, 9.9% from 18 to 24, 23.9% from 25 to 44, 16.5% from 45 to 64, and 4.6% who were 65 years of age or older. The median age was 21 years. For every 100 women, there were 106.3 men. For every 100 women age 18 and over, there were 113.9 men.

The median income for a household in the city was $35,556, and the median income for a family was $36,042. Men had a median income of $15,000 versus $20,833 for women. The per capita income for the city was $8,474. About 21.3% of families and 25.1% of the population were below the poverty line, including 36.0% of those under age 18 and none of those age 65 or over.

== Cultural activities ==
Yup'ik dancing is popular in the village. The high school has an Yup'ik Dance Team which often visits other villages for feasts and festivals. Often the village hosts a dance festival in the spring, and the large Cama-i festival in Bethel attracts many from Chefornak and the surrounding villages to display their dances and to see the dances of other regions.

== Subsistence living ==
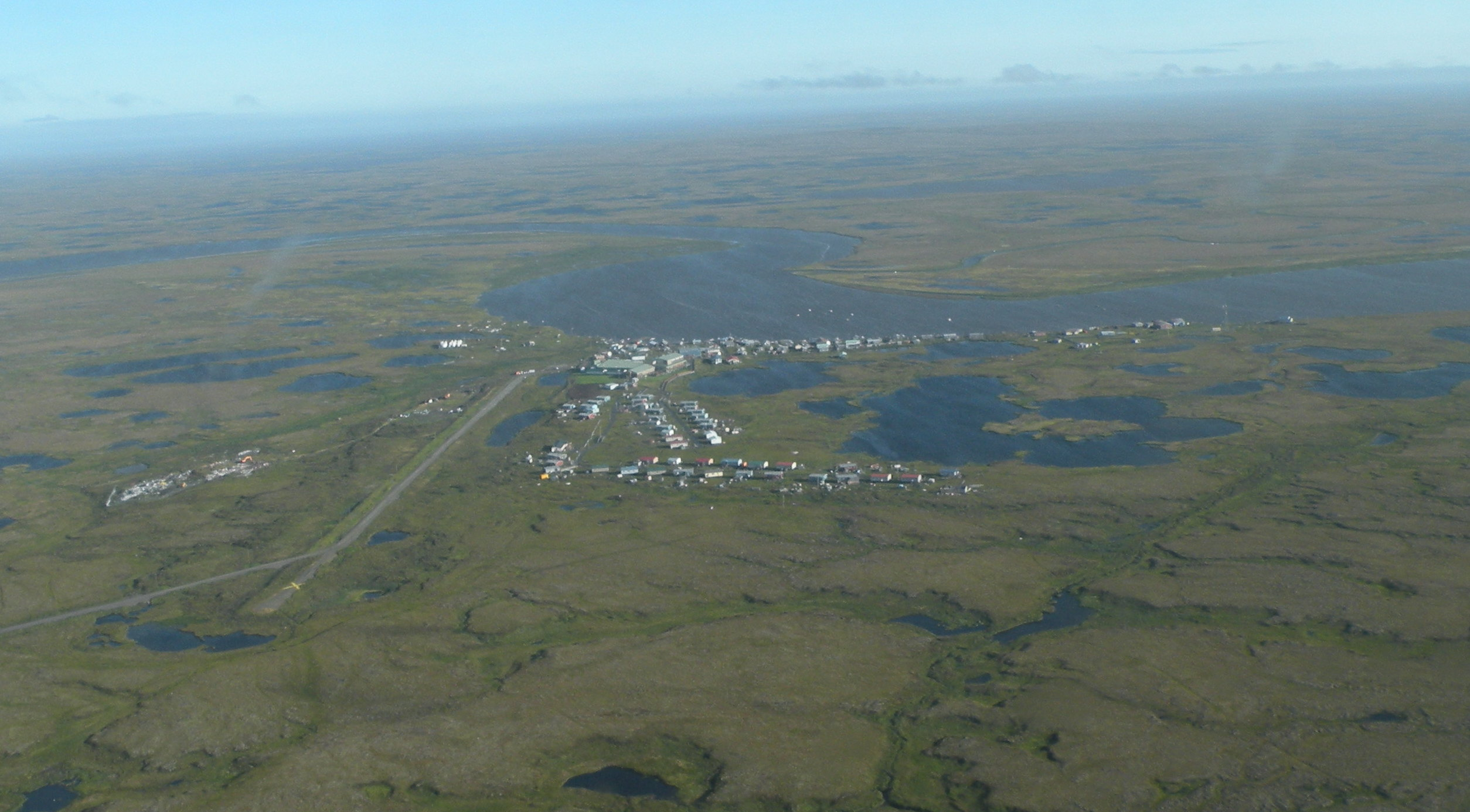
Aerial view of Chefornak

Many of the villagers live a subsistence lifestyle, which means that they continue to carry out the hunter-gatherer activities that their ancestors developed adapted to the local ecosystem. Important staples include fish such as halibut, salmon, and herring, which are dried and eaten like jerky. The Alaska blackfish is an important part of the local diet, and can be caught year round in the river. Residents gather berries such as salmonberries (cloudberries), black berries (crowberries), and blueberries (bog bilberries) are also gathered and used to prepare akutaq, a whipped dessert. Other Native foods that are gathered include mousefood, Labrador tea, and greens such as sourdock.

== Infrastructure ==
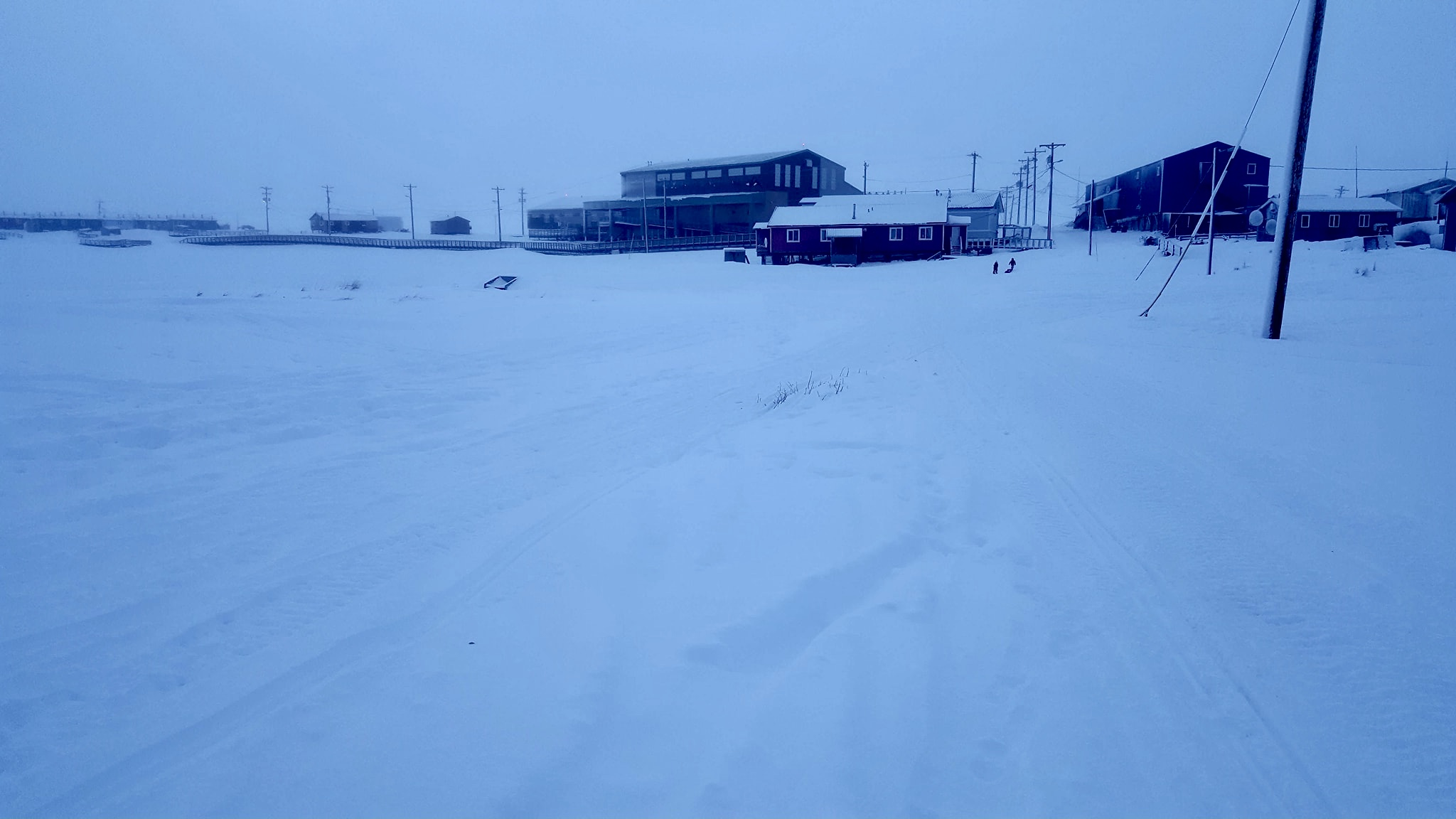
Center of the village in winter. The large building just left of center is the school, in front of it is the village complex, on the right is Chefarnrmute store.

Beside houses, public buildings in the village include:

- Chefarnrmute, Inc., the village corporation
- Avugiak's Store
- post office
- town hall/bingo hall
- school (elementary and high school are in one building)
- The Old School (formerly B.I.A. school)
- St. Catherine of Siena Catholic Church
- power plant

In 2024, $6.4 million was set aside to provide Chefornak with running water and sanitation.

== Education ==
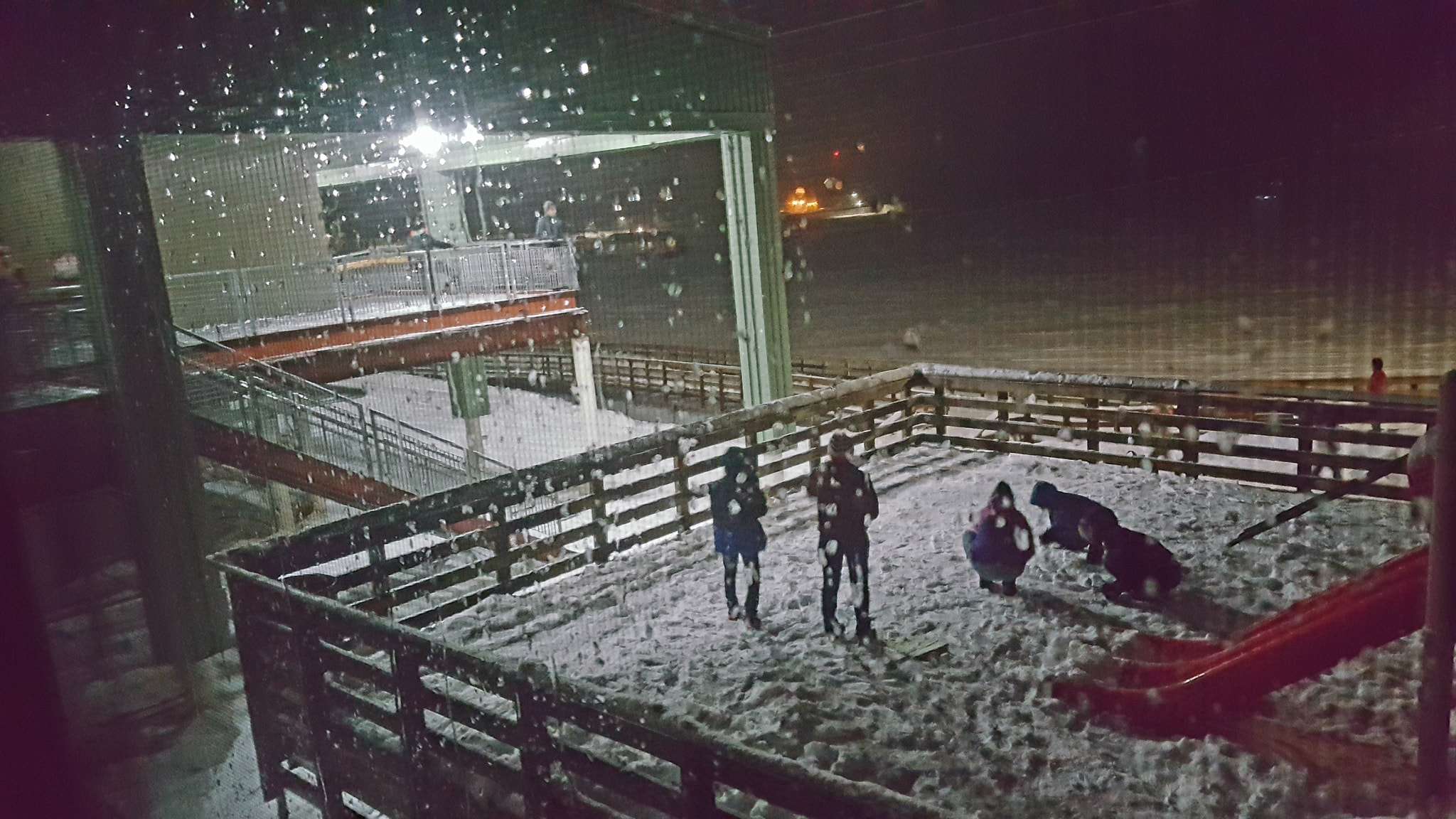
Kids recreating in the school playground

The Lower Kuskokwim School District operates the Chaputnguak School, an elementary school, and Amaqigciq School, a high school, which share a building. For the 2023–2024 school year, the two schools had a combined 132 students between pre-kindergarten and twelfth grade, with 6 teachers.

The Chaputnguak School was named for Chaputnguak, the original name for Chefornak and a Yup'ik word referring to an object or thing obstructing a pathway. The Amaqigciq School is named after Alexie Amaqigciq, a Yup'ik elder who selected the village site and first inhabitant of Chefornak,.

== Transportation ==
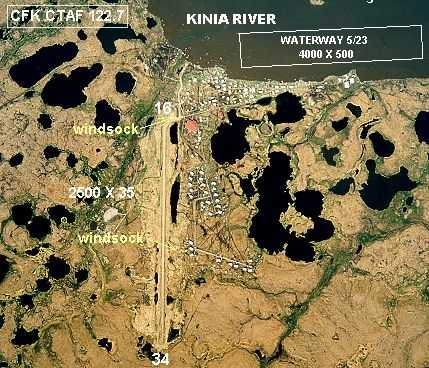
Aerial photograph of old Chefornak Airport (FAA: CFK).

People access the village of Chefornak primarily by small aircraft but can also reach it via snowmobile in the winter. Goods and mail are brought into the village by plane and, during the summer months, up the Kinia River by barge. Chefornak's airport has been moved further from the village due to concerns with its proximity to the school. The new airstrip has been constructed and is now in operation. Within the village, transportation options include four-wheel, bicycle, snow machine, and on foot.

== Notable people ==
- Paul John (1929–2015), Yup'ik elder, fisherman
