= Yupʼik cuisine =

Culinary traditions of Yup'ik people

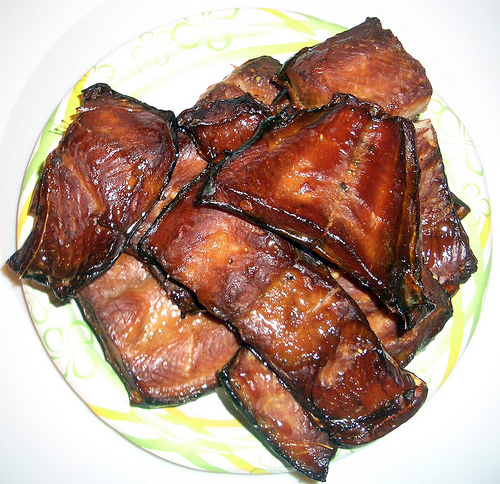
Smoked chum salmon

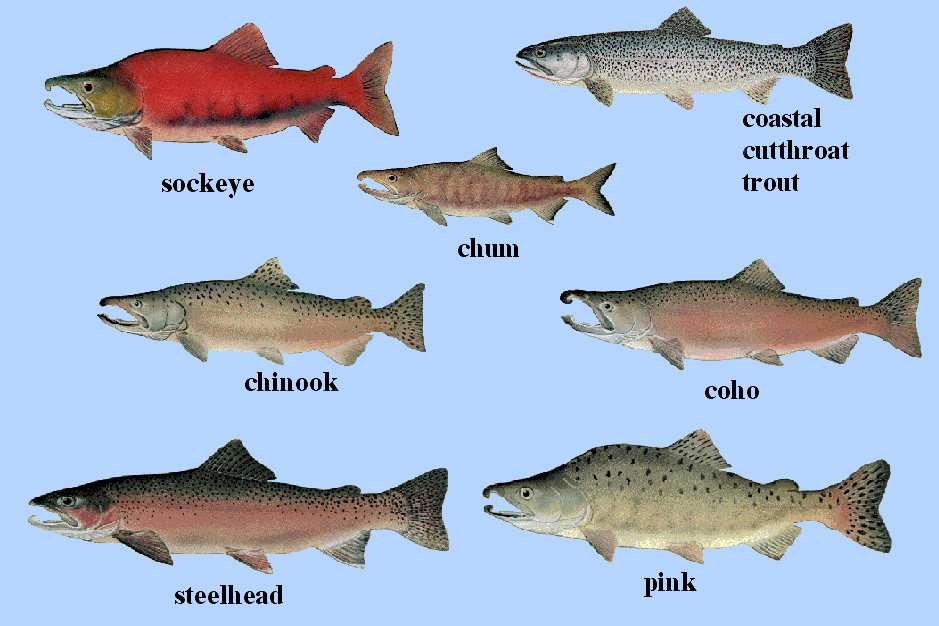
Alaskan economical salmonoid fish (neqa) species (Oncorhynchus) are main food (neqa) for the Yup'ik: Sockeye or Red salmon (sayak), Chum or Dog salmon (kangitneq), Chinook or King salmon (taryaqvak), Coho or Silver salmon (qakiiyaq), Pink or Humpback salmon (amaqaayak).

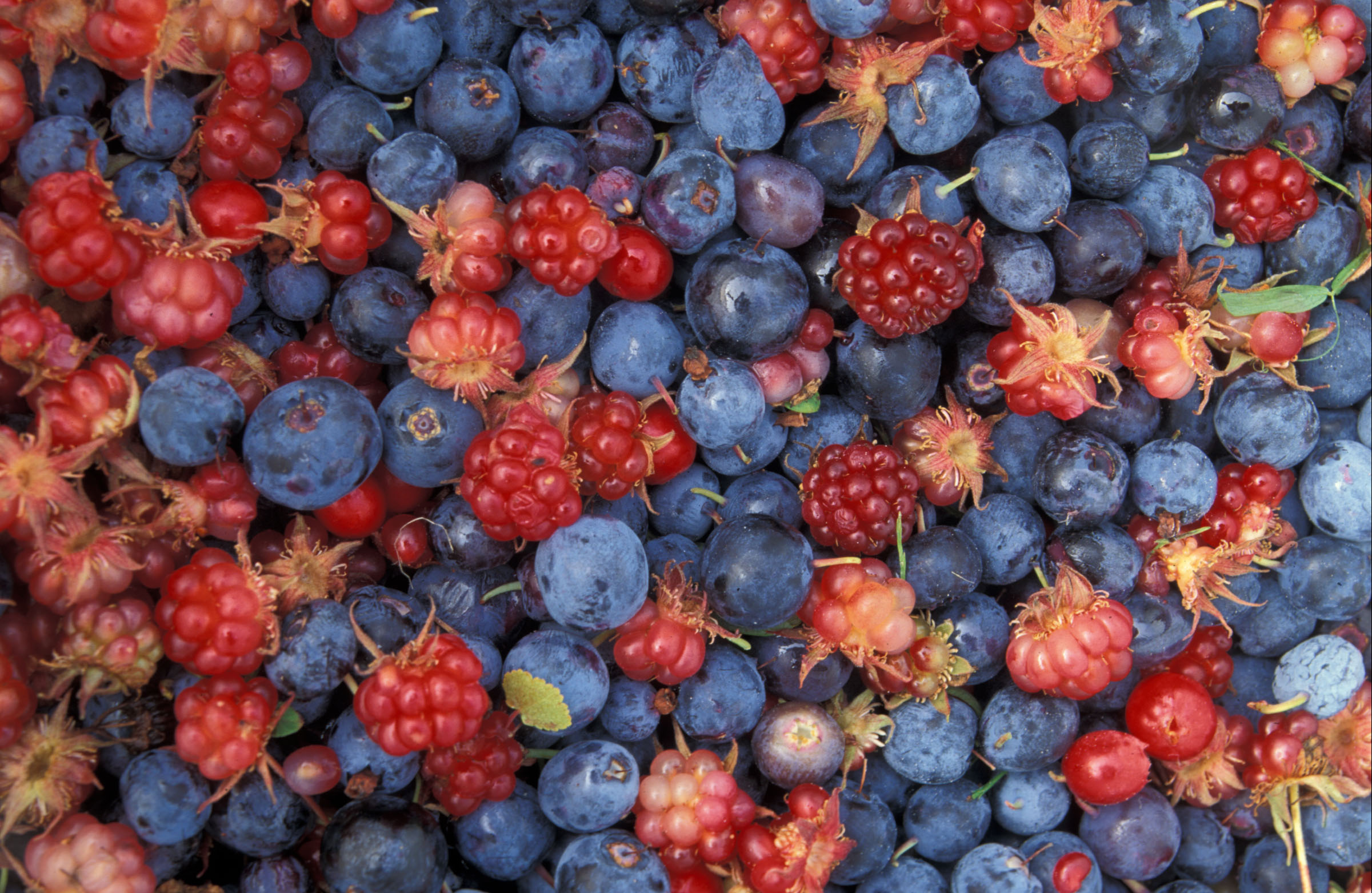
Alaska wild berries from the Innoko National Wildlife Refuge, a mixture of true berries (blue Vaccinium uliginosum and red Vaccinium vitis-idaea) and aggregate fruits (red Rubus arcticus)

Yup'ik cuisine (Central Yupik: Yupiit neqait, literally 'Yup'iks' foods' or 'Yup'iks' fishes') refers to the Inuit and Yup'ik style traditional subsistence food and cuisine of the Yup'ik people from western and southwestern Alaska. It is also known as Cup'ik cuisine for the Chevak Cup'ik-dialect-speaking Eskimos of Chevak and Cup'ig cuisine for the Nunivak Cup'ig-dialect-speaking Eskimos of Nunivak Island. This cuisine is traditionally based on meat from fish, birds, sea and land mammals, and normally contains high levels of protein. Subsistence foods are generally considered by many to be nutritionally superior superfoods. The Yup’ik diet is different from Alaskan Inupiat, Canadian Inuit, and Greenlandic diets. Fish as food (especially Salmonidae species, such as salmon and whitefish) are primary food for Yup'ik Eskimos. Both food and fish are called neqa in Yup'ik. Food preparation techniques are fermentation and cooking, also uncooked raw. Cooking methods are baking, roasting, barbecuing, frying, smoking, boiling, and steaming. Food preservation methods are mostly drying and less often freezing. Dried fish is usually eaten with seal oil. The ulu or fan-shaped knife is used for cutting up fish, meat, food, and such.

The Yup'ik, like other Eskimo groups, were semi-nomadic hunter-fisher-gatherers who moved seasonally throughout the year within a reasonably well-defined territory to harvest fish, bird, sea and land mammal, berry and other renewable resources. Yup'ik cuisine is based on traditional subsistence food harvests (hunting, fishing and berry gathering) supplemented by seasonal subsistence activities. The Yup'ik region is rich with waterfowl, fish, and sea and land mammals. The coastal settlements rely more heavily on sea mammals (seals, walruses, beluga whales), many species of fish (Pacific salmon, herring, halibut, flounder, trout, burbot, Alaska blackfish), shellfish, crabs, and seaweed. The inland settlements rely more heavily on Pacific salmon and freshwater whitefish, land mammals (moose, caribou), migratory waterfowl, bird eggs, berries, greens, and roots help sustain people throughout the region.

Akutaq (Eskimo ice cream), tepa (stinkheads), and mangtak (muktuk) are some of the most well-known traditional Yup'ik delicacies.

Traditional subsistence foods are mixed with what is commercially available. Today about half the food is supplied by subsistence activities, and the other half is purchased from commercial stores.

== Yupik Cuisine ==
Both the Yup'ik (and Siberian Yupik) and Iñupiaq cuisines are also known as Eskimo cuisine in Alaska. The oldest, most stable cuisine in North America is found above the Arctic Circle in Alaska. Long overlooked and pitifully misunderstood, the cuisine's roots lie buried in Eastern Asia, whence Iñupiaq and Yupik ancestors ventured to Siberia, across Beringia, and on to Alaska during the last ice age, 50,000 to 15,000 years ago. The remoteness of the Inupiat and Yupik cultures accounts for their rich and intact food history. The Yupik-Inupiaq split probably occurred about one thousand years ago. The Arctic cuisine is composed of a high-protein diet without grains, supplemented with wild greens, roots, and berries. Fortunately, dietitians consider the diet nutritious and balanced with abundant vitamins, minerals, proteins and valuable unsaturated fats derived from a vast array of sea and land mammals, fish, fowl, wild plants and berries.

Yup’ik cuisine is different from Alaskan Iñupiaq, Canadian Inuit, and Greenlandic diets. Yup'ik communities varied widely in what foods were available to them, but everyone used similar food processing and food preservation methods, including air drying and smoking, food storage in cold water and oil, fermentation, and freezing. Some foods were eaten raw.

Prehistoric Yup'ik Eskimos probably relied upon a mix of anadromous fish (salmon and char), terrestrial mammals (caribou), and marine mammals (seal and walrus) for subsistence foods.

== What meals the Yupik eat ==
The type of meal (neruciq) eaten at any given time varies by custom and location.

- Breakfast (unuakutaq) is eaten within an hour or two after a person wakes in the morning.
- Lunch or dinner (apiataq from Russian обе́д obéd) is eaten around mid-day.
- Supper or dinner (atakutaq) is eaten in the evening.

Seven-klaagmi unuakutalartukut, twelve-klaagmi-llu apiatarluta, tua-i-llu six-klaagmi atakutarluta.
"We eat breakfast at seven o'clock, lunch at twelve o'clock and dinner at six o'clock."

— Yuut Qanemciit (Tennant and Bitar eds. 1995 [1981]),

The Nunivak Eskimos (Nuniwarmiut in Cup'ig, Nunivaarmiut in Yup'ik and Cup'ik) eat frequently in the course of a 24-hour period. They go to bed at sundown or early evening in the spring and fall, and well before sundown in summer, but arise early, often at 3:00 or 4:00 a.m. and regularly at 5:00 or 5:30. The time of rising depended on the sea tide and the time when tomcod or other fish are running. The first meal of the day is eaten at this time and another about 11:00 a.m., with snacks once or twice in between depending on the work schedule and the availability of food. The evening meal is usually at 4:30 or 5:00 p.m. with additional snacks between the main meals. In winter the entire meal schedule is likely to be moved forward, with the first meal of the day being eaten at 10:00 or 10:30 a.m. The most common food is dried or frozen fish dipped in seal oil. The evening or late afternoon meal, the hot meal of the day, frequently consisted of boiled fish or other boiled food and tea.

== Food preservation and preparations ==
Food preparation techniques are uncooked raw (Cassar- "to eat raw flesh or meat", arepa- "to eat raw food"), fermentation, and cooking (keir-). In the past, the Yup'ik nourishment consisted of raw meat, including its blood, and sometimes the meat was cooked.

Food preservation

Meat or Flesh (kemek in Yup'ik and Cup'ik, kemeg in Cup'ig) is primary main food.

=== Fish in the food industry ===
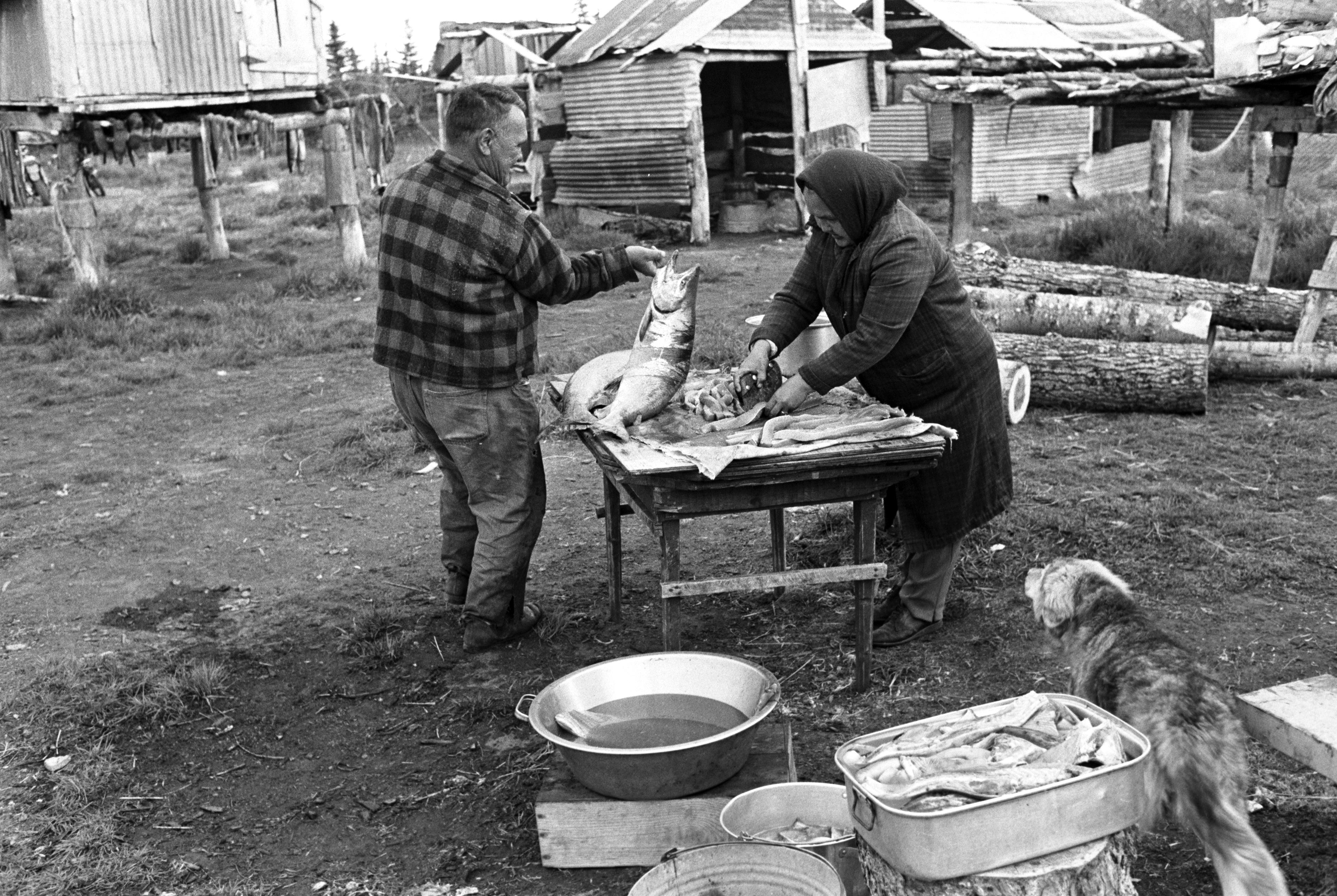
Native Alaskan husband and wife clean the catch of the day in Alaska in June 1975. Neq'liurtuk = he and she are working on fish; neq'liur- = to work on fish (cleaning them, preparing them for storage, etc.); carrir- = to clean; ciqret pl ciqeq sg = offal from cleaning fish.

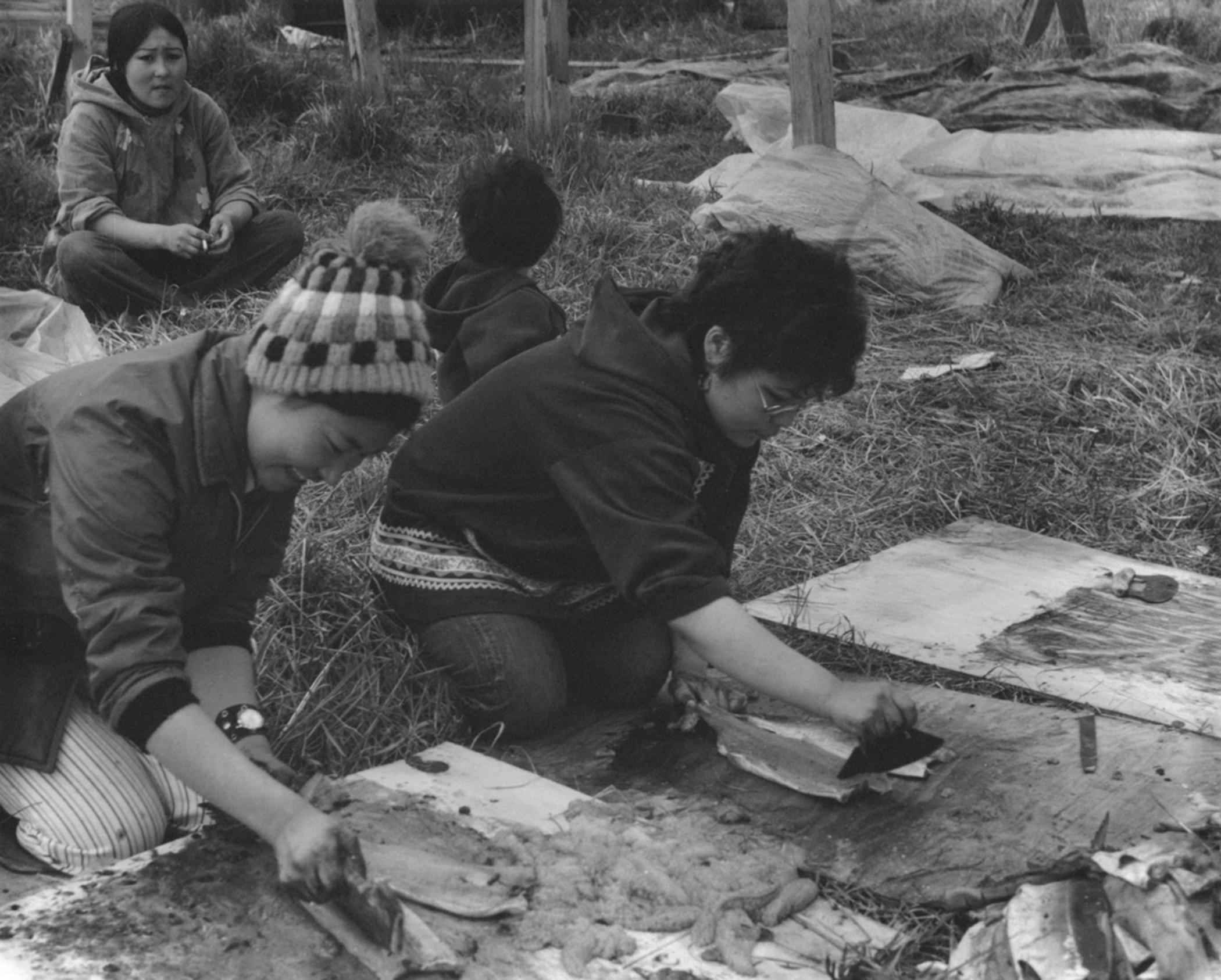
Nunivak Cup’ig women filleting salmon, Mekoryuk (Mikuryaq), Nunivak. 07-03-1972

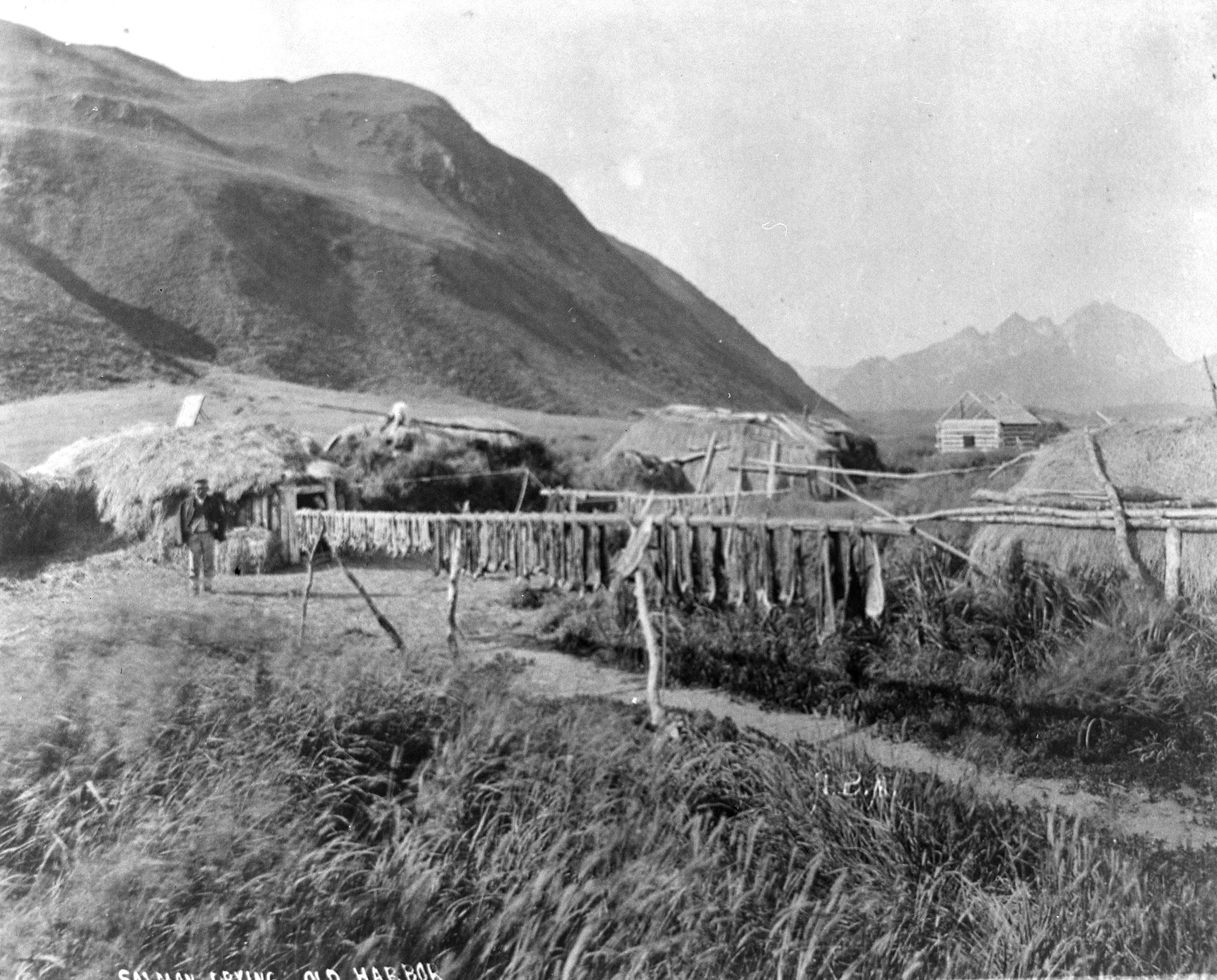
Salmon drying. Sugpiaq ~ Alutiiq village, Old Harbor, Alaska, 1889

Fish as food, especially Pacific salmon of the subfamily Salmoninae in the family Salmonidae or in some places, non-salmon species, such as freshwater whitefish of the subfamily Coregoninae in the family Salmonidae, are primary main subsistence food for Yup'ik Eskimos. Both food and fish (and salmon) called neqa sg neqet pl in Yup'ik. Also for salmon called neqpik ~ neqpiaq sg neqpiit ~ neqpiat pl in Yup'ik, means literally “real, genuine food”. But, main food for Iñupiaq Eskimos is meat of whale and caribou (both food and meat called niqi in Iñupiaq, also for meat called niqipiaq “real, genuine food”).

Salmon as food, herring as food, smelt, halibut, flounder, tomcod, pike, and capelin were gutted and air dried or smoked. The fish heads they made into qamiqurrluk (cut and dried fish heads), and some they made into tepa (aged fish heads). Fish eggs (roe) were dried and stored.

==== Uncooked ====
- Qassaq or Qassaulria is raw food, raw flesh or raw meat.
- Quaq (in the Inuit languages: Iñupiaq quaq, Nunavut Inuktitut and Nunavik Inuttitut ᖁᐊᖅ quaq, South Baffin Kingarmiut xuaq, Labrador Inuttitut ĸuak, Greenlandic quaq) is meat or fish to be eaten raw and frozen
- Nutaqaq is frozen raw fish.
- Qassayaaq or Qassayagaq (lit. «baby raw fish») frozen raw whitefish aged (fermented) before freezing and served frozen.
- Kumlaciq (in Yup'ik, kumlacir in Cup'ig) is frozen meat (of frozen fish, blackfish, and others as well) to be eaten in that state. Frozen food is a method for preserving fish or meat.
- Kumlaneq (in Yup'ik, kumlanaq in Hooper Bay-Chevak Cup'ik; but, kumlaner in Nunivak Cup'ig means "cold water, cold spring water; permafrost, frozen soil") is frozen fish to be eaten in that state. Freezing of chinook and particularly coho salmon was relatively common. Chinook salmon were usually cut up into smaller pieces before being placed into plastic Ziploc bags. Smaller species, such as chum, sockeye, coho, and pink salmon were frequently frozen uncut and whole.
- Kumlivirluuki is stored in freezer (kumlivik).
- Qercuqaq is hard frozen fish (blackfish or the like).
- Fermented fish is a traditional preparation of fish as fermented food.
- Ciss'uq (Ciss'ur in Nunivak Cup'ig) is fermented herring or capelin that have been buried underground for two weeks.
- Tepcuaraq (tepcuar(aq) or tepcuaraq kumlaneq) is fish that has been frozen after being allowed to age slightly, eaten uncooked and frozen. Kumlaneq is aged spawned out salmon. Tepcuaraq kumlaneq is aged and frozen fish. The whole fish can be either cleaned of their entrails or left intact, then buried under ground in a pit lined with grass and left for about a week depending on the temperature. If the fish are caught in the late fall, they are stored in a wooden or cardboard box until they are aged, and then frozen. Tepcuaraq kumlaneq are eaten frozen with seal oil.
- Tepngayaaq is fermented a little frozen fish.
- Tepa (sg Tepet pl; lit. «odor, smell, aroma, scent») is aged or fermented salmon fish head. Known as aged fish head or fermented fish head, commonly called as stinkheads, stink heads, stinky heads. Tepas were considered a traditional special Yup'ik delicacy, but really the dish is something favored mostly by older Alaska Natives.

Traditionally, most people continued to make tepa in the summer. Heads (pakegvissaaq is head of fish including pectoral fins) of chinook (king), sokeye (red), chum (dog), and occasionally, coho (silver) salmon were prepared by burying them in the ground and allowed them to ferment before eating. The traditional way to prepare tepa was to bury the heads in the ground along with most of the fish guts in a wooden barrel covered with burlap material. Earthen pits lined with grass were used for this process. Salmon milt and eggs were added to the heads which were then covered with another layer of grass before being covered over with earth. The fermenting process took from one to two weeks depending on temperature of the ground. One salmon production unit prepared four pits of tepa. The pits measured approximately 18 inches deep and 2 feet square and contained approximately 75 salmon heads each. The heads of 1,000 chinook, 726 sockeye, 1,246 chum, and 41 coho salmon were prepared as tepa by Kwethluk households during 1986. One resident told the researchers, "to the Native it's like candy or bubblegum, sweet and sour, in between the two." However, with the introduction of plastic buckets, the danger of botulism has surfaced and informants stressed the importance of avoiding these types of modern containers since the "oldfashioned" methods allowed oxygen to circulate and prevented the growth of bacteria which causes botulism. Heads stored underground in plastic bags are more likely to develop botulism than fish stored in grasses. It was soon discovered that the traditional method of preparing the tepas was safer than the modern way.

tepturraarlua unatenka qanganaruanek perrillruanka.
"after eating aged fish heads, I wiped my hands with wormwood (qanganaruaq)."

— Lower Kuskokwim,

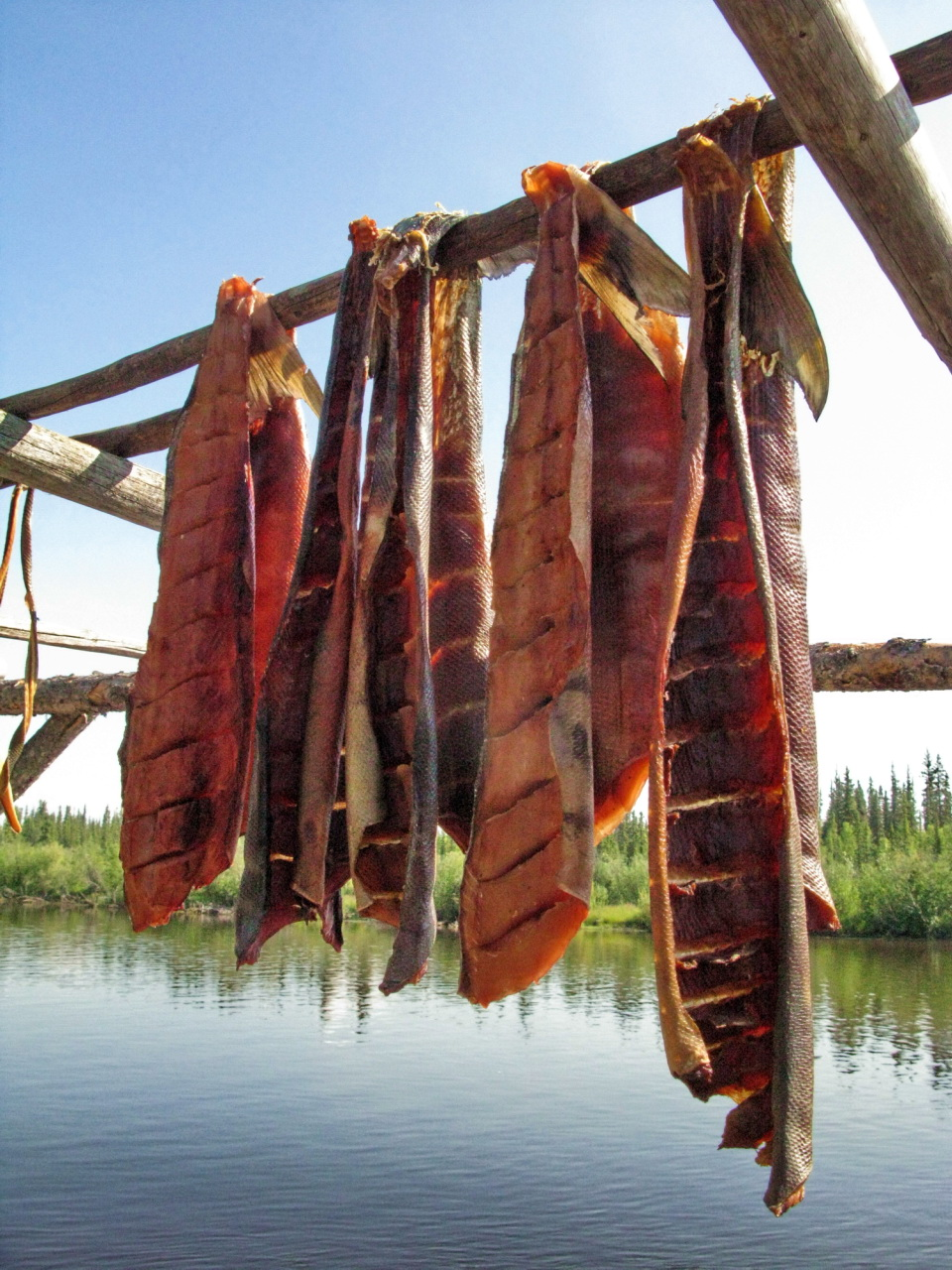
Salmon filets hanging on a rack by a river in Alaska. July 2009

- Arumaarrluk (arumarrluk) or arumaarrluaq is poke fish or poked fish slightly smoked and stored in seal oil.
- Uqumaarrluk is poke fish slightly aged and stored in seal oil.
- Puyuqer (Cıp'ig), puyuqaq (Yup'ik) is smoked fish
- Uqumelnguq (in Yup'ik, uqumelzngur in Cup'ig) is smoked fish soaked in seal oil.

Most of the salmon that was dried and smoked was eaten without any further preparation. Dried salmon sometimes eaten with seal oil.

- Niinamayak (in Yup'ik, nin'amayuk in Canineq Yup'ik, nin'amayag in Nunivak Cup'ig) is partially (half) dried aged (fermented) herring.
- Cin'aq (Yukon, Hooper Bay and Chevak, Lake Iliamna, and Nunivak) is cheese-like fish aged in a pit.

This fish is usually dog (chum) or king (chinook) salmon. The salmon whole (except the guts) aged through the process of burying them into the marshy, muddy lowland (maraq). The hole is dug until the permafrost is exposed. The bottom of the hole is then covered with dry grass, moss, and cardboard. Then several salmon are placed in. The top of the salmon is again covered with grass, moss and or cardboard, then the remaining dug up groung is placed back into the hole, tightly covering the contents. The aged salmon fish are usually dug out during the early winter, and eaten as a delicacy.

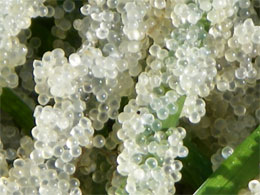
Herring spawn-on-kelp, Alaska

- Qaryaq (melucuaq) or ellquat is herring egg[s], or "spawn" on kelp.

According to the Yup'k dictionary, a single herring egg is melucuaq or qaarsaq, herring eggs (plural)/herring roe are called elquaq, while herring egg on kelp is called qaryaq. (Note: Wright & Chythlook (1985), p. 31 glosses "herring span-on-kelp" as melucuaq, based on survey principally around the Togiak/Bristol area. Anthropologist Julie Raymond-Yakoubian gives "herring eggs on kelp" as ellquat and "dried herring eggs imlaat" as imlaat in a tabulated lexicon from a different area, Stebbins.) Also called herring "spawn on kelp", this is a mass of fertilized eggs or roe (var. qaarsat, meluk, imlauk) of the Pacific herring attached to eelgrass, seaweed or other submerged vegetation. Herring spawn-on-kelp is a favored food among the majority of households in various communities in the "Togiak district" around Bristol Bay (Togiak, Manokotak, and Aleknagik). Residents of Twin Hills, Dillingham, etc. in the bay's area also eat spawn-on-kelp. In the Togiak district, harvests of spawn-on-kelp took place between late April and early June. "Spawn-on-kelp for subsistence use is generally picked by hand, though rakes are occasionally used". "Today, freezing and salting are the most common methods of preservation. In the past, spawn-on-kelp was preserved by drying and storage in open-weave grass baskets" (kuusqun, kuusqulluk). "As in the past, people today prefer to eat spawn-on-kelp dipped in seal oil. The product of the harvest is commonly shared with relatives and friends in the harvesters' home community during feats celebrating birthdays or holidays".
In all four Nelson Island communities (Tununak, Newtok, Toksook Bay, and Nightmute), and "much of the roe-on-kelp is consumed soon after it is harvested, but a portion of the harvest is preserved in seal-skin pokes filled with seal oil".
The practice of collection of herring roe on kelp in the Stebbins area community has also been field-studied.

- Imlaucuaq (in Yup'ik of Nelson Island, Imlaucuar in Nunivak Cup'ig; lit. «small roe») is herring sac roe.

"The sac-roe (imlacuaq) is dried into product resembling golden chips. The dried roe is placed in containers and stored in the cache. It is soaked in water prior to eating but is also eaten dried. All sac-roe from subsistence caught herring was processed in all four Nelson Island communities".

Number of salmon processed for subsistence use by Kwethluk households during 1986
Species	Harvested	Cooked (keniraq)	Smoked strips (palak’aaq)	Smoked "dry fish" (neqerrluk)	Frozen (kumlaneq)	Salted (sulunaq)	Canned (paankaraq)	Stinkhead (tepa)	Dog food (qimugcin)
King or Chinook	5,824	417	654	4,292	129	142	12	1,000	2
Red or Sockeye	5,423	276	136	3,153	5	0	0	726	1,790
Dog or Chum	9,738	77	0	8,031	84	0	0	1,246	1,543
Silver or Coho	3,545	94	30	1,084	330	157	12	41	902
Humpback or Pink	619	16	0	84	5	0	0	0	484
Total salmon	25,149	880	820	17,546	544	299	24	4,721	

==== Cooked ====
Cooking (kenir-) is the process of preparing food for consumption with the use of heat. There are very many methods of cooking. These include roasting (maniar-), barbecuing, baking (uute-), frying (assali-, asgir-), smoking (puyurte-, aruvarqi-, aruvir-), boiling (ega-), and steaming (puyiar(ar)-).

- Keniraq (lit. «cooked thing») is fresh cooked fish or other food (also stew).
- Ugka is cooked fish or other food.
- Uuqnarliq (Kuskokwim), uuqnarniq (Yukon), uqnarliq (Hooper Bay and Chevak) is cooked blackfish.
- Allemaaq (Hooper Bay and Chevak) is cooked blackfish fry.
- Maniaq (lit. «roasted thing») is roasted (barbecued) over an open fire fish.

All parts of the fish except the guts are used. Over an open fire, a green branch or drift wood is used by inserting the stick in the mouth of the fish, then pushing the stick though the fish along the backbone until the stick emerges at the base of the tail. the stick is then propped up near the open fire to begin roasting. a modern alternative is to wrap the fish in foil and piece it in the camp fire.

- Teggsiq'er (in Nunivak Cup'ig) half dried herring (specifically made for cooking).
- Uutaq (lit. «baked thing») is baked fish (also, hard candy or other hard-baked food; bread)
- Salkuuyaq or Sal'kuuyaq (Yup'ik), Cal'kuuyaq (Cup'ik) (also, casserole of meat or fish with potatoes, onions, etc.) is fresh fish baked whole or filleted after the entrails are removed.

The meat of fish baked whole is slit in the middle lengthwise on the other side. Fish are placed in a baking dish, seasoned, oiled, and baked. Younger people seem to prefer this over the plainer boiled fish. It is often eaten with boiled rice. It is derived from Russian Жарко́е (zharkóe) ‘roast’.

- Assaliaq (assaliq; lit. «fried thing»; also, pancake; other fried food; fry bread) is fresh fried fish. All parts of the fish except the entrails are used to prepare this dish, although often the heads are removed as well. The fish is filleted, dipped in seasoned flour, or just seasoned with salt, and fried in oil. If households enjoy picking and sucking backbones or only a few fish are available, the backbone will be fried along with the filleted pieces. Heads are sometimes fried for the same reasons. Boiled rice is the favorite side dish with this meal. Middle aged and younger people enjoy this meal for the flavor. The verb assali- (to fry; to make pancakes or griddlecakes) is derived from Russian жа́рить (zhárit’) ‘to roast, fry, broil, grill’.
- Egaaq (lit. «boiled thing») is boiled fish or other food (also, by extension, any cooked fish or other food).
- Egamaarrluk (egamaarruk or egamaaq) is partially dried (not smoked) fish boiled for eating. The partially dried and boiled fish is only partially cooked.

The half-dried salmon (egamaarrluk) which was cooked after being partially dried. Egamaarruk is split and half dried fish. these are prepared much like neqerrluk, but are not fully dried and may not be smoked. The half dried fish are boiled and eaten with seal oil. The egamaarrluk involved a similar process but the fish were kept as fillets rather than sliced into strips.

- Qamangatak (Egegik) is half-dried, boiled fish.
- Umlikaaq (or Umlikaq ~ Umlikqaq) or Ungllekaq (ungllik'ar in Nunivak Cup'ig) is fresh boiled fish.

All parts of the fish except for the entrails are used to prepare umlikqaq. Fresh fish that have been dead for less than a day make the best umlikqaq because the meat is still firm. If a freshwater fish is caught with a hook, it is best to kill the fish by hitting its head soon after capture so the meat will stay firm for cooking. The main ingredients of umlikqaq are cut-up fish, water, and salt which are boiled for about 29 minutes. This is a preferred food for elders because it easy to make and is not strongly seasoned. First heads are good prepared as umlikqaq. Also, Ungelkaaq is fish steak cut transversely.

- Qageq (sg Qagret pl) is day-old cooked blackfish. Blackfish that has been boiled and allowed to set in its cooled, jelled broth.
- Aagciuk is fish meatball made of the soft meat and bones of spawned-out fish, cooked by dropping in boiling water.

=== Mammals as food ===
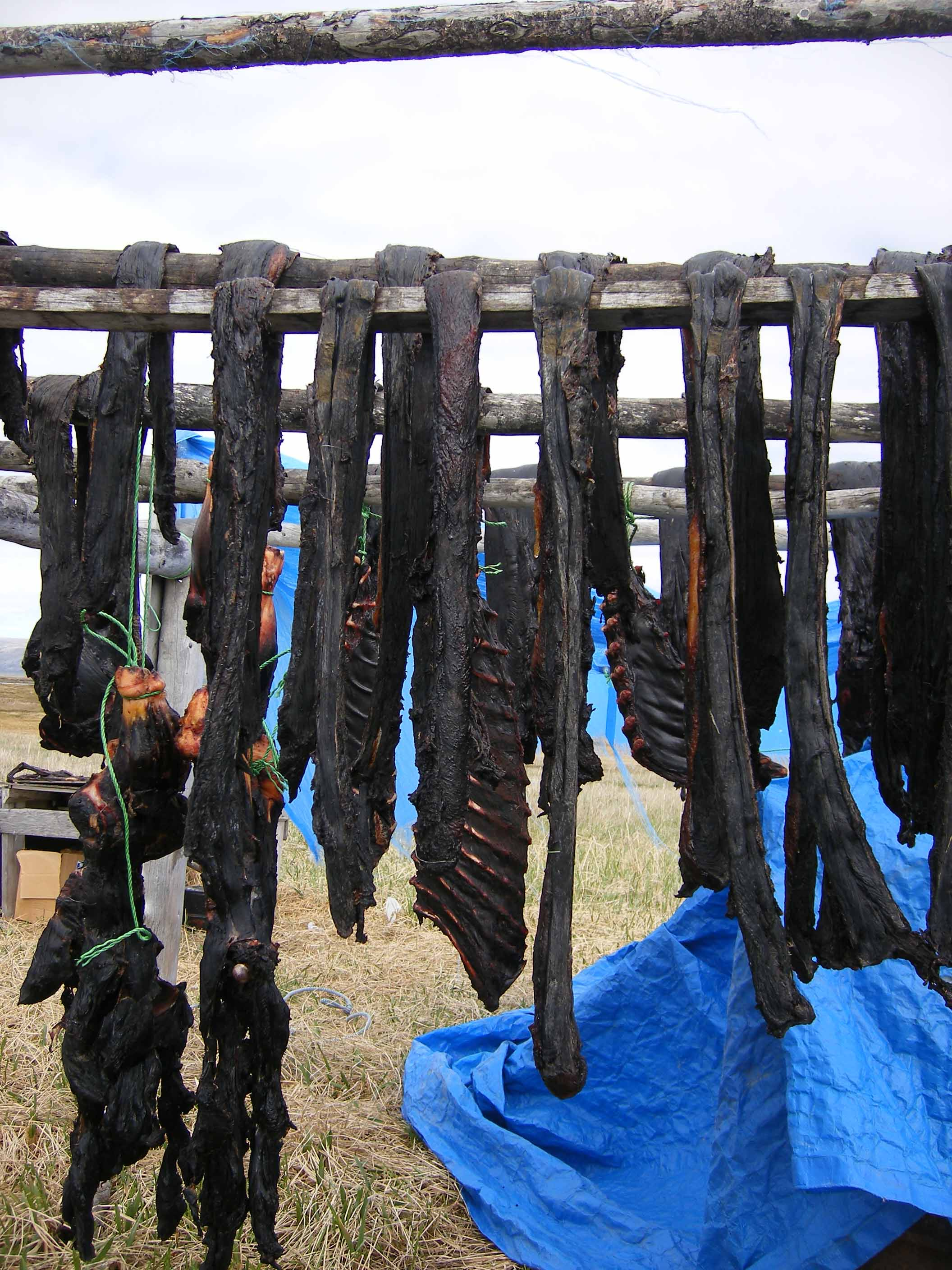
Strips of seal meat hang on a rack to dry at a summer subsistence camp. The dark meat is rich in oil to fuel hard work and keep people warm in the arctic. Cape Krusenstern National Monument in northwestern Alaska, June 2008.

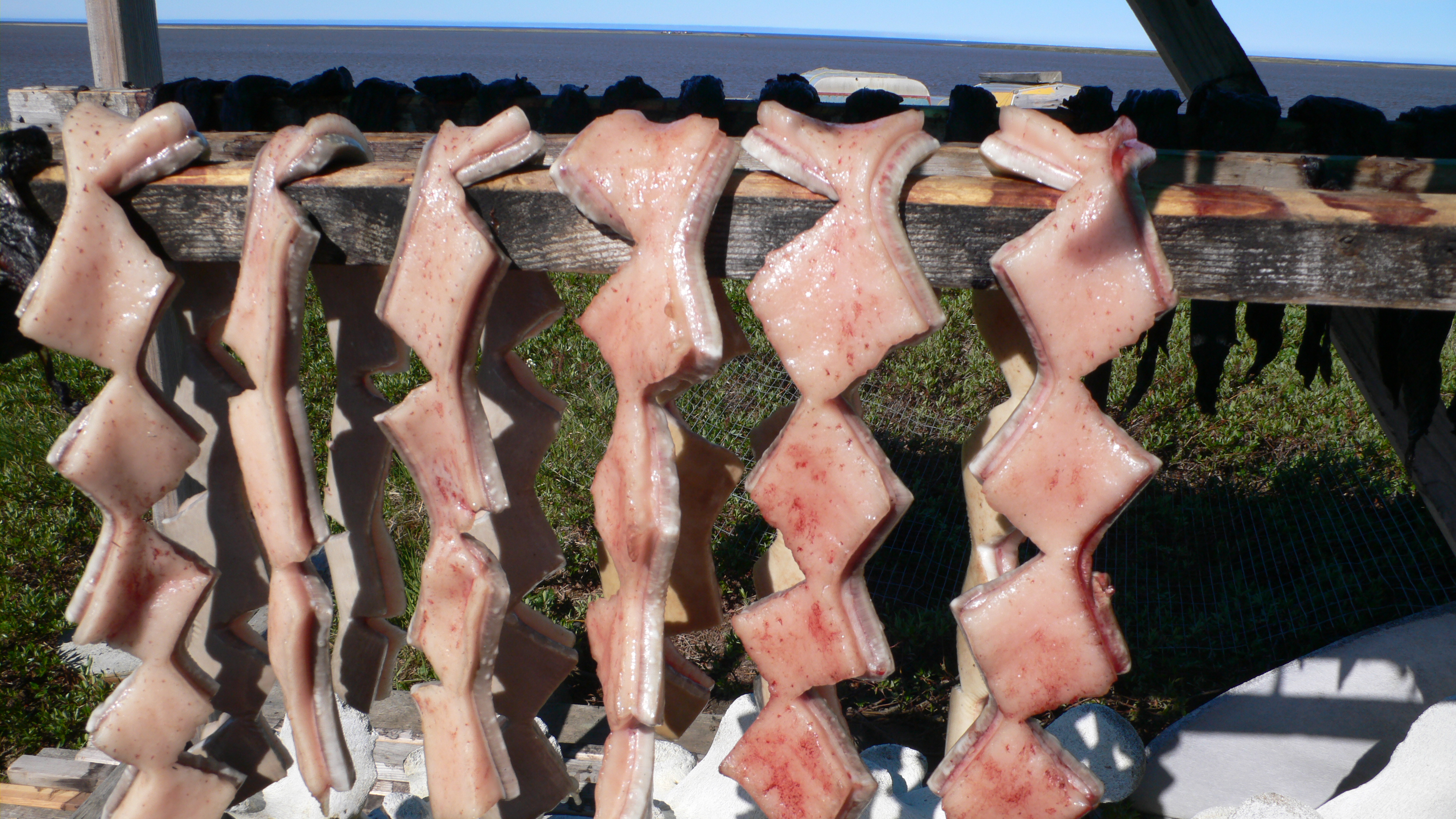
Muktuk drying at Point Lay, Alaska. June 24, 2007

Marine mammals as food are only seals and beluga whale. Seals were the primary marine mammal hunted.

Seal oil (uquq) was used by most households. Seal oil is a source of eicosapentaenoic acid (EPA), docosapentaenoic acid (DPA), and docosahexaenoic acid (DHA). Dried fish is usually eaten with seal oil.

- Tangviaq (Y), tangviarrluk (K, BB, HBC); tangviarrluggaq (NI, CAN) tangevkayak ~ tangevkayagaq (NI) tangeq (Y, NUN, NS) seal cracklings (strip of seal blubber from which oil has been rendered)
- Civanraq (sg civanrat pl) is fibrous leftover piece when seal oil has been obtained by heating diced seal blubber in a pan; crackling.
- Cuakayak is cooked seal lung.
- Uqiquq Passing out of bearded seal oil- The stripped long blubber for girls in the family and square cut blubber for men in the household.
- Uqiqur- to distribute seal blubber and meat and gifts when someone has caught a seal; to give a “seal party”
- Beluga whale meat
  - Muktuk (mangtak in Yukon, Unaliq-Pastuliq, Chevak, mangengtak in Bristol Bay) is the traditional Eskimo meal of frozen raw beluga whale skin (dark epidermis) with attached subcutaneous fat (blubber).
  - Aaqassaaq (Kotlik) is skin to be chewed to soften it; beluga blubber for eating.
  - Tamukassaaq is aged beluga skin. (also, skin to chew on such as dried fish skin)
- Taaqassaaq is skin for chewing.

The hide and flippers from fresh walrus may be fermented to make taaqassaaq.

- Kinengyak (sg kinengyiit pl) is dried meat (caribou, moose)

Dry moose meat was a favorite food among Chuathbaluk and Sleetmute inhabitants.

- Qemitaq (lit. «strangled thing») is muskrat or squirrel that has been hung by the neck to dry after being skinned.

=== Birds as food ===
The flesh of virtually all waterfowl in the environment was eaten, either fresh or dried, usually with oil or a sourdock leaf soup. Even cormorants were considered edible and the meat of these fishy-tasting birds was dried or boiled when freshly killed. The eggs of waterfowl were sometimes sucked raw, but were usually boiled. Unlike Eskimos of the adjacent mainland, the Nunivaarmiut did not boil eggs hard and pack them in pokes for use during the winter. Instead, if there were more eggs than could be consumed at the time of collecting, they were hard-boiled and, still in their shells, placed in wooden dishes of seal oil to be kept for a short while.

=== Plants as food ===
Akutaq (in Yup'ik and Cup'ik, akutar in Cup'ig, akutuq in Iñupiaq) or Eskimo ice cream, also known as Yup'ik ice-cream, Yupik ice-cream, Inupiaq ice-cream, Inupiat ice-cream, Alutiiq ice cream is a mixture of berries, sugar, seal oil, shortening, flaked fish flesh, snow, etc. Akutaq is most common Eskimo delicacy in Alaska, and the only dessert in Eskimo cuisine. Both Eskimo ice cream and Indian ice cream are also known as native ice cream or Alaskan ice cream in Alaska. There are different types of akutaq.

Akutaq is served on all special occasions. Like Yup'ik dance, akutaq is not an everyday dish. It is a special treat, an honor to receive and a responsibility to give. "Mouse akutak" is made from roots found in mouse holes. Only a portion of the mouse's stored roots is taken, and some people replace the roots with something else the mouse can eat.

The mousefood or mouse food (ugnaraat neqait) consists of the roots of various tundra plants which are cached by voles in burrows. Mousefood are grains gathered by a mouse and buried in shallow tunnels that sprout in the fall or spring rains. The tender green sprouts are often one of the first fresh foods available. Mousefood is eaten much like one would eat a small salad or fresh greens.

== Pastry ==
Bread (kelipaq Yukon, Kuskokwim, Hooper Bay and Chevak, Nelson Island, Canineq, Bristol Bay, Nushagak River, Lake Iliamna, Egegik, kelipar in Cup'ig from Russian хлеб khleb; qaqiaq bread in Yukon, Unaliq-Pastuliq from Iñupiaq qaqqiaq; qaq'uq in Yukon, Unaliq-Pastuliq from Iñupiaq qaqquq; kuv'aq in Yukon; tevurkaq in Unaliq-Pastuliq, tuurkaq in Lower Yukon from English dough) The uutaq is hard candy or other hard-baked food; bread

Flour (mukaaq in Yup'ik and Cup'ik, mukaar, muk'ar in Cup'ig from Russian мукá muká)

Fried bread (uqulek Hooper Bay and Chevak, uqurpag in Cup'ig; alatiq in Bristol Bay, alaciq in Egegik from Russian Оладьи alad’i) The maniaq (Yup'ik and Cup'ik), maniar (Cup'ig) is pancake; fried bread; roasted thing

Frybread or fry bread (uqup'alek in Kuskokwim) is the characteristic widespread Native American homemade deep-fried biscuit, sometimes called “Eskimo doughnut” locally, known as “bannock” in Canada. Both frybread and pancake are also known as asgiq or assaliaq (Unaliq-Pastuliq). The verb assali- "to fry; to make pancakes or griddlecakes" from Russian жа́рить zhárit’ The Eskimo doughnut is a deep-fried biscuit, a little like fry bread in doughnut form or fried bannock. Iñupiaq style Eskimo doughnut (aka "mukparuks"; muqpauraq or uqsrukuaqtaq ~ uqsripkauqtaq in Iñupiaq) is pretzel-like Eskimo doughnut and basically a mixture of seal oil, flour, and water, baked and fried in seal oil.

Pilot bread or cracker (cugg'aliq ~ sugg'aliq from Russian Сухари sukhari’; qaq'ulektaaq in Yukon, Unasliq-Pastuliq) specifically means the manufactured, substantial unsalted crackers known as “pilot bread” (or “hardtack”) common in the North but not elsewhere.

Cookie (cugg'alinguaq in Egegik)

Easter bread (kulic'aaq from Russian Кулич kulích) Russian Orthodox Easter bread.

== Drinks ==
Naklegnaqluteng yuullrullinilriit yuurqayuunateng, caayurtusuunateng, kuuvviartusuunateng-llu neqekarrlainarnek tau͡gaam ner’aqluteng.
"Poor things; they lived their lives without having hot beverages — no tea, no coffee; they just ate fish."

— Martha Teeluk-aam Qulirat Avullri Erinairissuutekun Agnes Hootch-aamek (1960s),

Tea (caayuq in Yukon, Unaliq-Pastuliq, Hooper Bay and Chevak, Nelson Island, Upper Kuskokwim, Nushagak River, Lake Iliamna, Egegik, saayuq Lower Kuskokwim, Canineq, Bristol Bay, caayu Nunivak Cup'ig; from Russian чай chay)

Coffee (kuuvviaq in Yup'ik and Cup'ik, kuupiaq in Unaliq, kuuvviar in Cup'ig; from Russian ко́фе kófe). The kuuvviapik ~ kuuvviapiaq is real coffee (in contrast to alqunaq or instant coffee, decaffeinated coffee, or ersatz coffee)

== Nutrition ==
Nutrition is the selection of foods and preparation of foods, and their ingestion to be assimilated by the body. Human nutrition is the provision to obtain the essential nutrients necessary to support life and health.

Alaska subsistence communities are noted to obtain up to 97% of the omega-3 fatty acids through a subsistence diet. The cardiovascular risk of this diet is so severe that the addition of a more standard American diet has reduced the incidence of mortality in the native population. Still, many market (store-bought) foods are high in fats, carbohydrates, and sodium; and these may lead to increased weight gain, high cholesterol (hypercholesterolaemia), high blood pressure (hypertension), and chronic diseases. Increasing EPA and DHA intakes to amounts well consumed by the general US population may have strong beneficial effects on chronic disease risk. Yup’ik Eskimos have a prevalence of type 2 diabetes of %3.3, versus %7.7 in the U.S. overall, even though the Yup’ik Eskimos have overweight/obesity levels similar to the rest of the U.S. In a preliminary study initiated by the Center for Alaska Native Health Research (CANHR) at the University of Alaska Fairbanks, elders were significantly enriched in δ^{15}N, but depleted in δ^{13}C, relative to younger participants.

== Tools ==
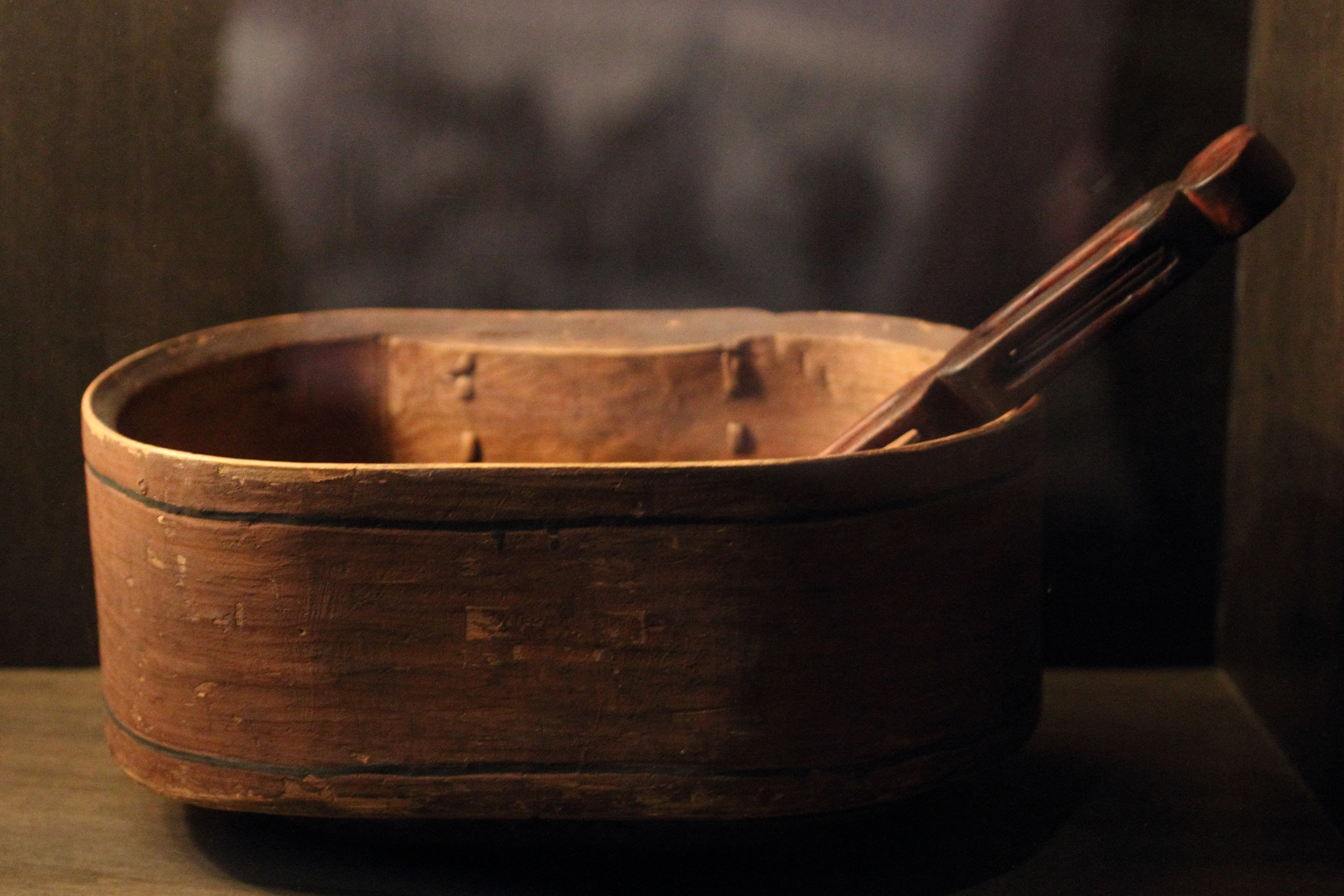
Tumnaq used to make Eskimo ice cream, circa 1910

== Food storage ==
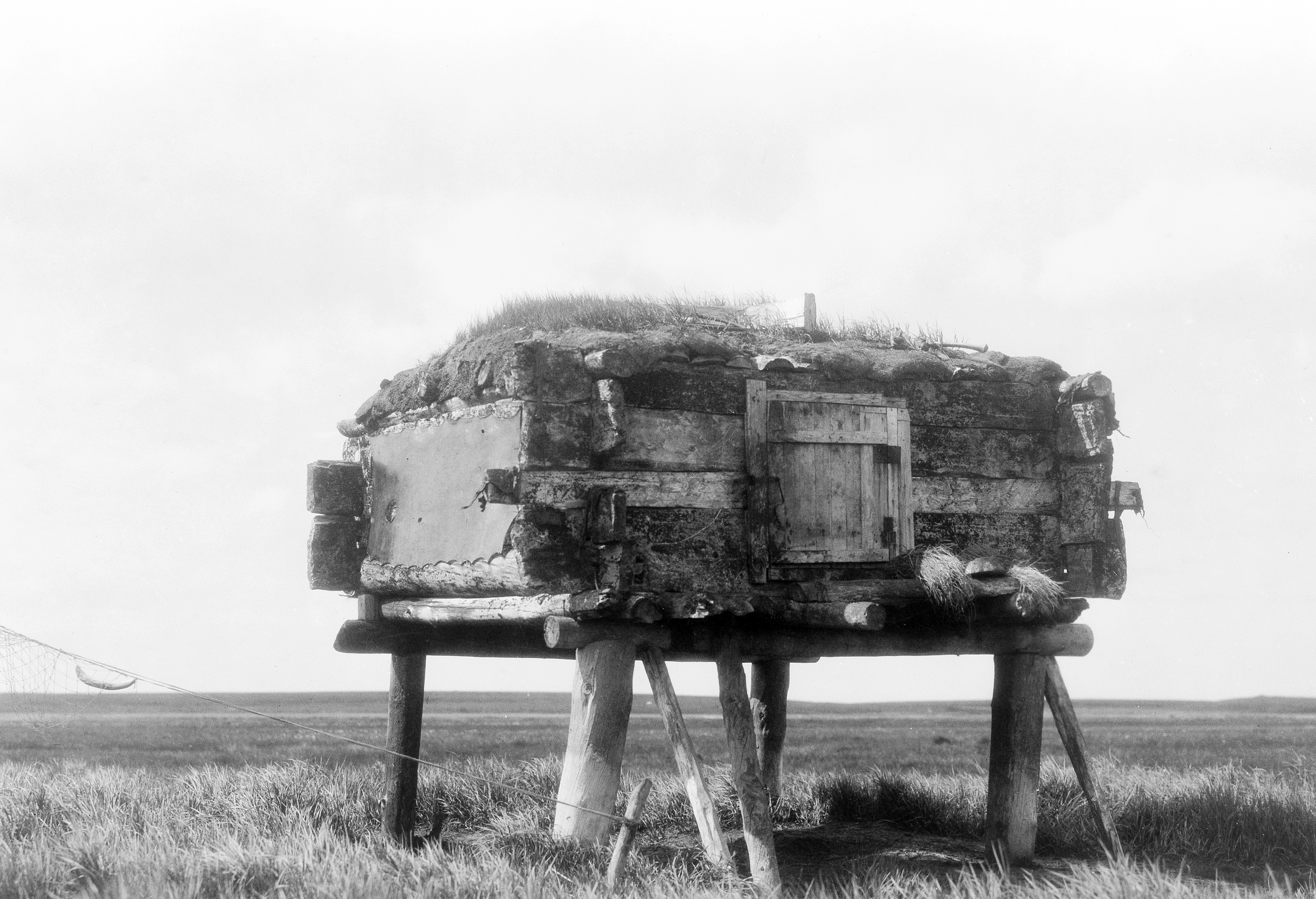
Elevated cache (qulvarvik, qulrarvik, neqivik, enekvak, mayurpik, mayurrvik, ellivik, elliwig) was used to store food where it would be safe from animals. Hooper Bay, Alaska, 1929.

Food storage

Dried and smoked salmon were usually stored in smokehouses, freezers, or caches belonging to the head of the salmon production unit. Salted fish were kept in buckets or wooden barrels and were stored in the house, entryway, cache, or smokehouse. Frozen salmon were kept in household freezers. Whole frozen coho salmon, used for dog food, were sometimes stored outside in pits.

Elevated cache or raised log cache, also raised cache or log storehouse (qulvarvik sg qulvarviit pl [Yukon, Kuskokwim, Bristol Bay, Nushagak River, Lake Iliamna], qulrarvik [Egegik], qaivarrvik, neqivik [Hooper Bay-Chevak, Yukon, Nelson Island], enekvak [Hooper Bay-Chevak], mayurpik [Hooper Bay-Chevak], mayurrvik [Nelson Island], ellivik [Kuskokwim], elliwig [Nunivak]) is a bear cache-like safe food storage place designed to store food outdoors and prevent animals from accessing it. Elevated cache types include log or plank cache, open racks, platform caches, and tree caches. The high cabin-on-post cache was probably not an indigenous form among either Eskimos or Alaskan Athabaskans. Cabin-on-post caches are thought to have appeared in the 1870s. The cabin-on-post form may thus have been introduced by early traders, miners, or missionaries, who would have brought with them memories of the domestic and storage structures constructed in their homelands.

== Dog food ==
For thousands of years, dogs (qimugta sg qimugtek dual qimugtet pl in Yup'ik and Cup'ik, qimugta sg qimugteg dual qimugtet pl in Cup'ig) as sled dogs, have been tightly interwoven in the Yup'ik way of life, for transportation and companionship. Except for dogs, there were no important domesticated animals in aboriginal times.

Dog food (qimugcin, qimugcitkaq, qimugcessuun) refers to food for the dogs. Alunga is homemade dog food (a boiled mixture of fish and meat products) and Alungun is dog-feeding trough. Salmon is the best food to feed (nerqe-) dogs. Chum, coho, and pink salmon were the species most frequently processed for dog food. In addition to dried salmon processed for dog food, whole uncut salmon and the heads, entrails, and backbones, not preserved or prepared for dog food, were also used as dog food. Chum salmon harvested during August for use as dog food were usually dried. Between late August and early October, coho salmon harvested for dog food were preserved by burying whole in earthen pits.

Beluga (especially late fall hunting) are used for feeding dogs in the Bristol Bay areas.

== Food sources ==
The Yup'ik, like other Eskimo groups, were semi-nomadic hunter-fisher-gatherers who moved seasonally throughout the year within a reasonably well-defined territory to harvest fish, bird, sea and land mammal, berry and other renewable resources. Subsistence is the practice of hunting, fishing, or gathering food to live on (not to resell), and is practiced by almost all the Yup'ik. In the inland, fishing for red salmon and gathering berries in the summer as well as hunting caribou or moose in the fall and winter constitute the primary seasonal subsistence activities of the inland Yup'ik villages.

The Yup'ik region is rich with waterfowl, fish, and sea and land mammals. The coastal settlements rely more heavily on sea mammals (seals, walrusses, beluga whales), many species of fish (Pacific salmon, herring, halibut, flounder, trout, burbot, Alaska blackfish), shellfish, crabs, and seaweed. The inland settlements rely more heavily on Pacific salmon and freshwater whitefish, land mammals (moose, caribou), migratory waterfowl, bird eggs, berries, greens, and roots help sustain people throughout the region.

Subsistence foods are generally considered by many to be nutritionally superior superfoods. Wild salmon, game meat, and berries harvested by Alaska Natives are world class fare compared to processed, canned, high priced items they find at their local mercantiles. Lonner (1986) compares the generally high carbohydrate foods of local grocery stores with “vital proteins and fats” in subsistence foods. In addition, the hunting and gathering of subsistence foods are favored activities among many rural Alaskans if not spiritually and culturally necessary.

The primary subsistence food in the Bristol Bay region and in most of rural Alaska is salmon, followed closely by big game hunting of caribou and moose in the more inland areas, and marine mammal hunting in the coastal areas.

The Alaska Department of Fish and Game (ADF&G) is the State of Alaska's regulatory agency for the management of fish and wildlife resources.

The U.S. Fish and Wildlife Service's mission is similar to that of the Alaska Department of Fish and Game in its goals to “protect, conserve, and enhance” fish and wildlife resources—however, for the good of the nation at large.

=== Fish ===
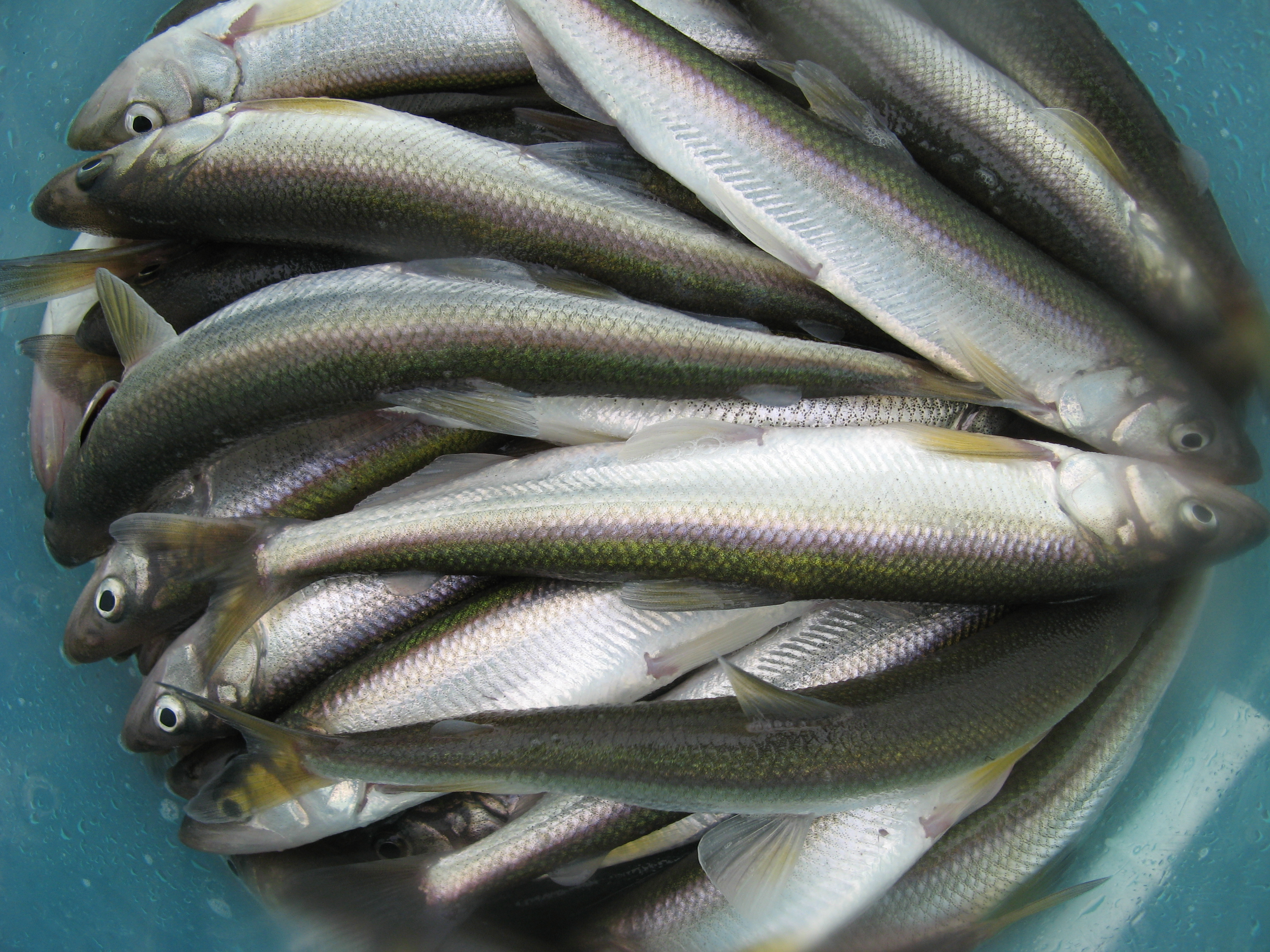
Fresh-caught smelt (probably rainbow smelt), Kuskokwim River, Alaska, May 2008

Fish (neqa sg neqek dual neqet pl in Yup'ik and Cup'ik neqa or iqallug in Cup'ig) is one of the most common Yup'ik foods.

- Pacific salmons Oncorhynchus (neqpik in Yup'ik, literally "real fish") are anadromous fish as they spawn in freshwater (salmon run) and spend at least a part of their lives in the ocean. Salmon is a staple of the native Alaskan diet and natives have traditionally used all parts of the fish.
- Red salmon or sockeye salmon Oncorhynchus nerka (sayak in Yup'ik, cayak in Cup'ik, cayag in Cup'ig)
- King salmon or Chinook salmon Oncorhynchus tschawytscha (taryaqvak, tarsarpak, kiagtaq in Yup'ik, taryaqvak in Cup'ik, taryaqvag in Cup'ig)
- Silver salmon or coho salmon Oncorhynchus kisutch (qakiiyaq, uqurliq, caayuryaq in Yup'ik, qavlunaq in Cup'ik, ciayuryar in Cup'ig)
- Dog salmon or chum salmon Oncorhynchus keta (iqalluk, aluyak, kangitneq, mac'utaq in Yup'ik, qavlunaq, neqpik in Cup'ik, mac'utar in Cup'ig) is second-largest of the Alaskan salmonids. In Alaska, chum salmon often called dog salmon due to their fierce dentition exhibited during spawning as well as the males tendency to bite and nip at each other. Salmon snobs of Alaska will often turn up their noses at chum salmons because they are thought to be only fit for dog food.
- Humpback salmon or pink salmon Oncorhynchus gorbuscha (amaqaayak, amaqsuq, luqaanak, terteq in Yup'ik, cuqpeq in Cup'ik)
- Rainbow trout or steelhead Oncorhynchus mykiss (talaariq in Yup'ik, kangitner in Cup'ik) were usually cooked fresh and dried.
- Trout (charr) or Dolly Varden Salvelinus malma (iqallugpik [Kuskokwim, Yukon], yugyaq [Bristol Bay] in Yup'ik, iqalluyagar in Cup'ig) were usually cooked fresh and dried.
- Lake trout Salvelinus namaycush (cikignaq) were usually cooked fresh and dried.
- Sheefish or inconnu Stenodus nelma (ciiq) were preserved by drying, smoking, and freezing. Sheefish were also eaten fresh; cooking methods included boiling and baking.
- Grayling Thymallus arcticus (culugpauk, culugpaugaq, nakrullugpak, nakrutvalek in Yup'ik, culugpaugar in Cup'ig) were usually cooked fresh and dried.
- Pike Esox lucius (cuukvak, cukvak, ciulek, keggsuli, qalru, luqruuyak, eluqruuyak) were normally preserved by drying and were usually eaten without any further praparation. Pike were sometimes cooked and eaten while fresh.
- Blackfish or Alaska blackfish Dallia pectoralis (can'giiq, imangaq in Yup'ik, can'gir, taqikar in Cup'ig) were cooked by pouring boiling water intermittently into a pot containing the fish and letting them steam for several minutes. They were one of few species of the fish that were usually not dried.
- Lush or burbot Lota lota (manignaq, aninirpak, tengugpalek, kanayurnaq) were preserved by drying and freezing. Cooking methods included boiling and baking.
- Herring Clupea pallasii (iqalluarpak, iqallugpak, neqalluarpak in Yup'ik, iqalluarpag in Cup'ig) prefer spawning (qurre-) locations in sheltered bays and estuaries. "One of the largest spawning concentrations of herring in Alaska occurs in the Togiak district of Bristol Bay in the eastern Bering Sea. Herring and herring spawn-on-kelp have been harvested for subsistence use by residents of this coastal area as long as people can recall. Commercial fishing for herring in the Togiak district began in 1967 and expanded dramatically after 1977... Prior to 1983, subsistence harvests of herring and spawn-on-kelp were not regulated".
- Smelt or rainbow smelt Osmerus mordax subsp. dentex (qusuuq, iqalluaq, cimigliq, cimerliq, cimerliaq, cimirliq, cemerliq, elquarniq, uqtaqngaq, qimaruaq in Yup'ik, quyuuq, cemerliq in Cup'ik, quss'ur in Cup'ig) were cooked by frying and roasting when eaten fresh. Some fishermen who harvested smelt consider these fish as "emergency food," to be kept in the smokehouse or cache and used if supplies of dried salmon ran out or if food shortages occurred.

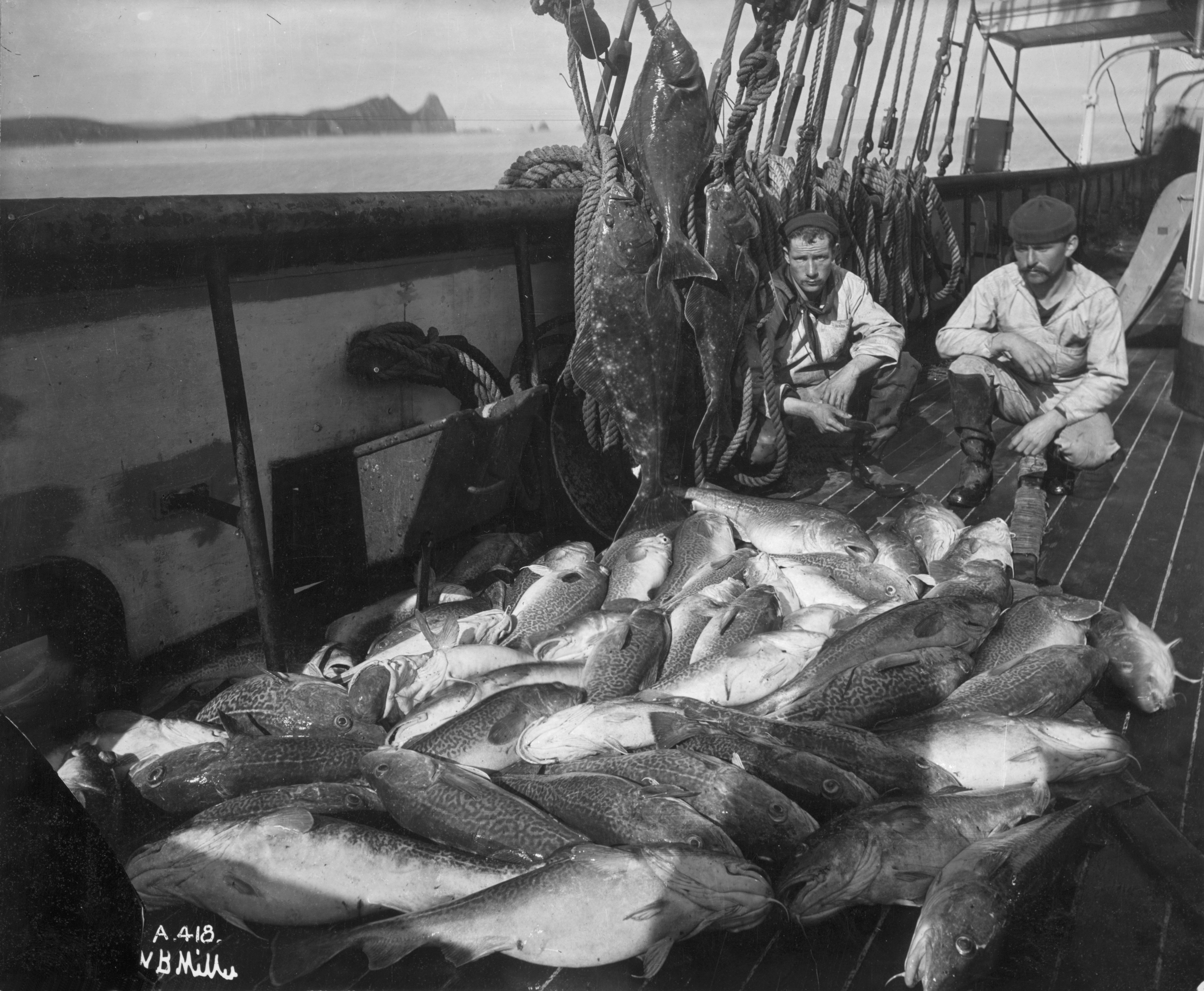
Commercial fishing (before 1927): manignaalleryak (Yup'ik) atgiaq (Bristol Bay) atgiiyar (Cup'ig) = Pacific cod (Gadus macrocephalus) and naternarpak (Yup'ik ~ Cup'ik) cagiq (Cup'ik) cagir (Cup'ig) = halibut (Hippoglossus stenolepis).

=== Sea mammals ===
Marine mammals or sea mammals (imarpigmiutaq sg imarpigmiutaat pl in Yup'ik and Cup'ik, imarpillar in Cup'ig) are only fin-footed species, such as seals and walruses. There are four species of seals in Alaska that are referred to as ice seals (or ice associated seals) because they use sea ice for some important life history events such as pupping, nursing, molting, and resting. This ice seals (ringed, bearded, spotted, and ribbon seals) are all used for subsistence by coastal Alaska Natives for food, oil, materials, clothing, and handicrafts.

- Bearded seal Erignathus barbatus (maklak sg makliik dual makliit pl in Yup'ik and Cup'ik, maklag in Cup'ig) is the best-known species of the seals living in the all Eskimo (Yupik and Inuit) regions. For Yup'ik hunters, bearded seals were the seal of choice. Bearded seals were widely considered the best seal for meat. The blubber was rendered into oil.
- Ringed seal Pusa hispida or hair seal (nayiq sg nayiik dual nayiit pl in Yup'ik and Cup'ik, nayir in Cup'ig), known as "winter seal" or "regular seal", is the only seals generally available throughout the region all winter. In terms of meat, ringed seals were generally second in preference to bearded seals. However, ringed seals were the first choice of many hunters for oil.
- Spotted seal Phoca largha, Phoca vitulina largha and/or Harbor seal Phoca vitulina (issuriq sg issurik dual issurit pl in Yup'ik and Cup'ik, issuri in Cup'ig) ...
- Ribbon seal Histriophoca fasciata (qasruliq in Yup'ik and Cup'ik, qasruleg in Cup'ig) was hunted only occasionally. Their meat is rich in blood and not a favored food, but some hunters liked the oil.
- Steller's sea lion Eumetopias jubatus (uginaq sg uginak dual uginat pl in Yup'ik and Cup'ik, apakcug in Cup'ig) was not hunted or hunted only occasionally (at the present time). Sea lions are most common near the St. Lawrence Island Siberian Yupik communities of Gambell and Savoonga.
- Walrus or Pacific walrus Odobenus rosmarus divergens (asveq sg asverek ~ asevrek dual asveret ~ asevret pl in Yup'ik kaugpak in Cup'ik, kaugpag in Cup'ig). Hunting of walrus and other marine mammals in western Bristol Bay, including Round Island (Yup'ik Qayaciq literally "place to go in a kayak") as part of the Walrus Islands State Game Sanctuary, by the native people (Yup'ik-speaking Tuyuryarmiut) of the Togiak area over the last 2,500 years is documented by archaeological and ethnohistorical evidence. Much of the walrus was used for food, including the hide, fat, muscle, tissue, flippers, head (including the brains) and various internal organs such as the heart, liver, kidneys, and lungs.
- Beluga whale or white whale Delphinapterus leucas (cetuaq, assigarnaq, qecip'atuli in Yup'ik cituaq in Cup'ik, cetuar in Cup'ig) is used for human and dog food. Beluga harvested in spring are used primarily for human food, although some are used for dog food. Beluga harvests in the fall usually are lower than in spring. The late fall beluga hunts were used to produce food for the dogs. Parts of the beluga used for human food include the skin, fat, backstrap, and intestines. Backstrap meat is sometimes dried, and beluga skin is sometimes pickled. Beluga products are prepared a number of ways, such as boiling skin and meat (eaten hot or cold); flouring and frying or barbecuing backstraps; and processing fat into oil for use with dried fish and meat. Ways of preserving and using beluga products show local differences between communities and families.

=== Land mammals ===
Terrestrial mammals or land mammals (nunarmiutaq sg nunarmiutaat pl in Yup'ik) are game animals and furbearers.

- Game animals (pitarkaq sg pitarkat pl in Yup'ik and Cup'ik, pitarkar sg pitarkat pl in Cup'ig). Caribou, moose and "bears" are included in the definition of the word pitarkat.
- Caribou or wild caribou Rangifer tarandus granti (tuntu, tuntupik or tuntupiaq in Yup'ik and Cup'ik, tuntupig in Cup'ig). Prior to European contact, caribou were important not only for their meat but for the skins which were an important item used in clothing. The Russians encouraged the Eskimos to adopt Western-style dress in order to release more furs for trading. The second most commonly received resources for Manokotak residents were caribou (%64.8 of households). Caribou meat was often made into jerky. The stomach contents such as sedges and other greens, were eaten. Virtually all of the edible parts of the animal was utilized. Caribou have been absent from Nunivak Island for at least 100 years, but many of the procedures for preparing the flesh of this animal also apply to the domestic reindeer. In earlier times, however, caribou livers were placed in the animal's stomach to ferment; this is no longer done. The lining of a reindeer stomach was cut up and eaten with dried fish or by itself. Lungs and kidneys were given to the dogs, but the heart was eaten. Neither caribou meat nor fish were ever pounded as a method of preservation.
- Reindeer or (semi)domestic caribou Rangifer tarandus tarandus (qusngiq in Yup'ik and Cup'ik, qusngir in Cup'ig). The word qusngiq which is derived from the Chukchee qoraŋe (ӄораӈы) or Koryak qoyaŋa (ӄойаӈа). In Europe, use the terms "caribou" and "reindeer" synonymously, but in Alaska and Canada "reindeer" refers exclusively to semi-domesticated forms. Only in North America are wild Rangifer referred to as "caribou". In Eurasia, "reindeer" are classified as either domesticated or wild. Domestic reindeer (Rangifer tarandus tarandus) were introduced into Alaska 100 years ago and have been maintained as semidomestic livestock. They have had contact with wild caribou (R. t. granti) herds, including deliberate crossbreeding and mixing in the wild. Reindeer have considerable potential as a domestic animal for meat or velvet antler production, and wild caribou are important to subsistence and sport hunters. The Bureau of Indian Affairs (BIA) managed reindeer operations on the Nunivak Island beginning in 1940. The Nunivak herd is composed of about 4,000 reindeer. The southern half of Nunivak is a designated Wilderness area, which presents challenges in summertime herding, since use of motorized recreational vehicles is forbidden within the Wilderness area without adequate snow cover.
- Moose or Alaska moose Alces alces gigas (tuntuvak in Yup'ik and Cup'ik, tuntuwag in Cup'ig, literally "big caribou"). The most commonly received resources for Manokotak residents were moose (%79.6 of households). Moose were not usually seen in the lower Kuskokwim River drainages until the early 1940s. Moose meat (tuntuviim kemga) was preserved by freezing and drying. Rarely was moose meat preserved by smoking or canning. Hunters who harvested moose at spring camps in the mountains preserved meat by cutting it into strips and hanging it on racks or bushes to dry in the sun, making jerky. This jerky was eaten without further preparation, or it was boiled. Virtually all of the moose was used. Bones were cracked and the marrow was removed. Fat from the back and rump was cut into small pieces and eaten uncooked along with meals at home and when in the field. Part of the stomach was cleaned and prepared, and the heart, liver, and kidneys were also eaten. The whole head was usually kept so that the muscles, brain, tongue, and nose could be removed and cooked. The feet and hooves were also cooked and eaten. Moose was cooked in variety of ways including boiling, roasting, stewing, frying and in soups.
- Muskox Ovibos moschatus (umingmar, maskar in Nunivak Cup'ig). Alaska's original muskox were hunted to extinction in the mid-1800s – perhaps by whalers and others. They had originally ranged Alaska's arctic and western coastal tundra. In 1935–1936 the U.S. Biological Survey brought 31 muskoxen from Greenland to Nunivak Island in an effort to reestablish the species in Alaska and as a means for subsistence living. The first modern hunting season was in 1975. Today the Nunivak herd numbers around 600 animals, down from a high of around 700 animals in 1968.
- Brown bear (grizzly) Ursus arctos horribilis (taqukaq, carayak Yup'ik and Cup'ik, paugnar in Cup'ig) and Black bear Ursus americanus (tan'gerliq in Yup'ik and Cup'ik, tungulzria in Cup'ig) were harvested for food (meat and fat). Bear meat (tan'gerlim kemga) made into jerky was often dried over a couple of weeks time. The internal organs, such as heart, kidneys, and intestines were often distributed to elders. Both black and brown bear meat was considered very tasty and was prepared by drying, boiling, baking, and roasting. The bones were boiled so that all of the meat could easily be removed from them. The marrow was only occasionally used because the bones are very thick and not easily broken. The liver was considered to be too rich and was not eaten.
- Furbearers or fur-bearing animals (melqulek sg melqulget pl in Yup'ik and Cup'ik, melquleg in Cup'ig) are commonly trapped for their pelts and meats. The meat of all types of furbearers (beaver, mink, otter, muskrat, marten, lynx), except for fox, wolf, and wolverine, was used for human food and was also used as dog food.
- Red fox Vulpes vulpes (kaviaq in Yup'ik and Cup'ik, kavviar in Cup'ig). The Nunivak Cup'ig practiced few restrictions with reference to food, but the flesh of the red fox was avoided since it was believed to cause a person to sleep during the day and be restless at night. This restriction did not apply to the flesh of the white fox.
- Arctic fox Vulpes lagopus (uliiq in Yup'ik and Cup'ik, qaterlir [white fox], eqyerer [blue fox] illaassug [cross fox] in Cup'ig)
- Sea otter Enhydra lutris (arrnaq in Yup'ik and Cup'ik, aatagar in Cup'ig)
- Land otter or river otter Lontra canadensis (cuignilnguq in Yup'ik and Cup'ik, cenkar, pirturcir(ar) in Cup'ig)
- American mink Neogale vison (imarmiutaq in Yup'ik and Cup'ik, imarmiutar in Cup'ig). Mink skin parkas, and also mink pants for small boys, formerly were made.
- Beringian or American ermine Mustela erminea, Mustela richardsonii (narullgiq in Yup'ik and Cup'ik, terriar(ar) [in winter coloration] narullgir [in summer coloration] in Cup'ig)
- Marten Martes americana (qavcicuaq in Yup'ik and Cup'ik)
- Muskrat Ondatra zibethicus (kanaqlak, tevyuli in Yup'ik and Cup'ik, kanaqlag in Cup'ig)
- Vole Microtus miurus (singing vole) and Clethrionomys rutilus (northern red-backed vole) (avelngaq in Yup'ik and Cup'ik)
- Collared lemming or Northern collared lemming Dicrostonyx groenlandicus (qilagmiutaq in Yup'ik and Cup'ik). Iñupiaq people do not eat lemmings
- Brown lemming or Nunivak Island brown lemming Lemmus trimucronatus harroldi (pugultu in Cup'ig)
- Beaver Castor canadensis (paluqtaq in Yup'ik and Cup'ik, paluqtar in Cup'ig)
- Porcupine Erethizon dorsatum (issaluuq, issaluq, cukilek, ilaanquciq, nuuniq) were harvested primarily for food and were prepared much the same way that hare were prepared.
- Tree squirrel or red squirrel Tamiasciurus hudsonicus (qiguiq in Yup'ik and Cup'ik)
- Ground squirrel or parky squirrel, parka squirrel Spermophilus parryii (qanganaq in Yup'ik and Cup'ik, qanganar in Cup'ig) were skinned and hung on meat drying racks to dry.
- Marmot or hoary marmot Marmota caligata (cikigpak in Yup'ik and Cup'ik) were used similarly to parka squirrels.
- Hare Lepus othus (qayuqeggliq in Yup'ik and Cup'ik, qayuqegglir in Cup'ig) and Rabbit Lepus americanus (maqaruaq in Yup'ik and Cup'ik, maqaruar in Cup'ig) can be prepared much like poultry meat: roasted, broiled, grilled, fried, and stewed.

=== Birds ===
Birds (tengmiaq sg tengmiak dual tengmiat pl or yaqulek sg yaqulgek dual yaqulget pl in Yup'ik and Cup'ik, tengmiar sg tengmiag dual tengmiat pl in Cup'ig)

Eggs of some species were collected.

Waterfowl were prepared in a variety of ways such as boiling, baking, and in soups.

- Common eider or Pacific eider Somateria mollissima (metraq in Yup'ik and Cup'ik, angiikvak in northern Yup'ik dialects, metr(ar), nanwista, metrapig ♀ tunupista ♂ in Cup'ig)
- King eider Somateria mollissima (qengallek in Yup'ik and Cup'ik, qengalleg in Cup'ig).
- Steller's eider Polysticta stelleri (anarnissakaq [Yukon], caqiar(aq) [Kuskokwim] in Yup'ik, qaciar(ar) in Cup'ig)
- Oldsquaw or long-tailed duck Clangula hyemalis (allgiar(aq) [Kuskokwim], allgiar [Bristol Bay], aliaaliq [Unaliq-Pastuliq], aarraaliq, aarraangiiq [Kuskokwim] in Yup'ik, aarraangiiraq, aarrangyaraq in Cup'ik, aarrangiir in Cup'ig).
- Swan or tundra swan, whistling swan Cygnus columbianus columbianus (qugyuk in Yup'ik and Cup'ik, qugsuk [Unaliq-Pastuliq], caqulegpak [Egegik], qugyug in Cup'ig)
- Sandhill crane Grus canadensis (qucillgaq in Yup'ik and Cup'ik, qucilkuryug in Cup'ig).
- Ptarmigan were preserved by freezing or drying after being plucked or skinned. Once dried, the birds commonly were eaten without any other preparation. As with many dried foods, seal oil a frequent to dried ptarmigan. Ptarmigan were also cooked by boiling and were often the basis for soups.

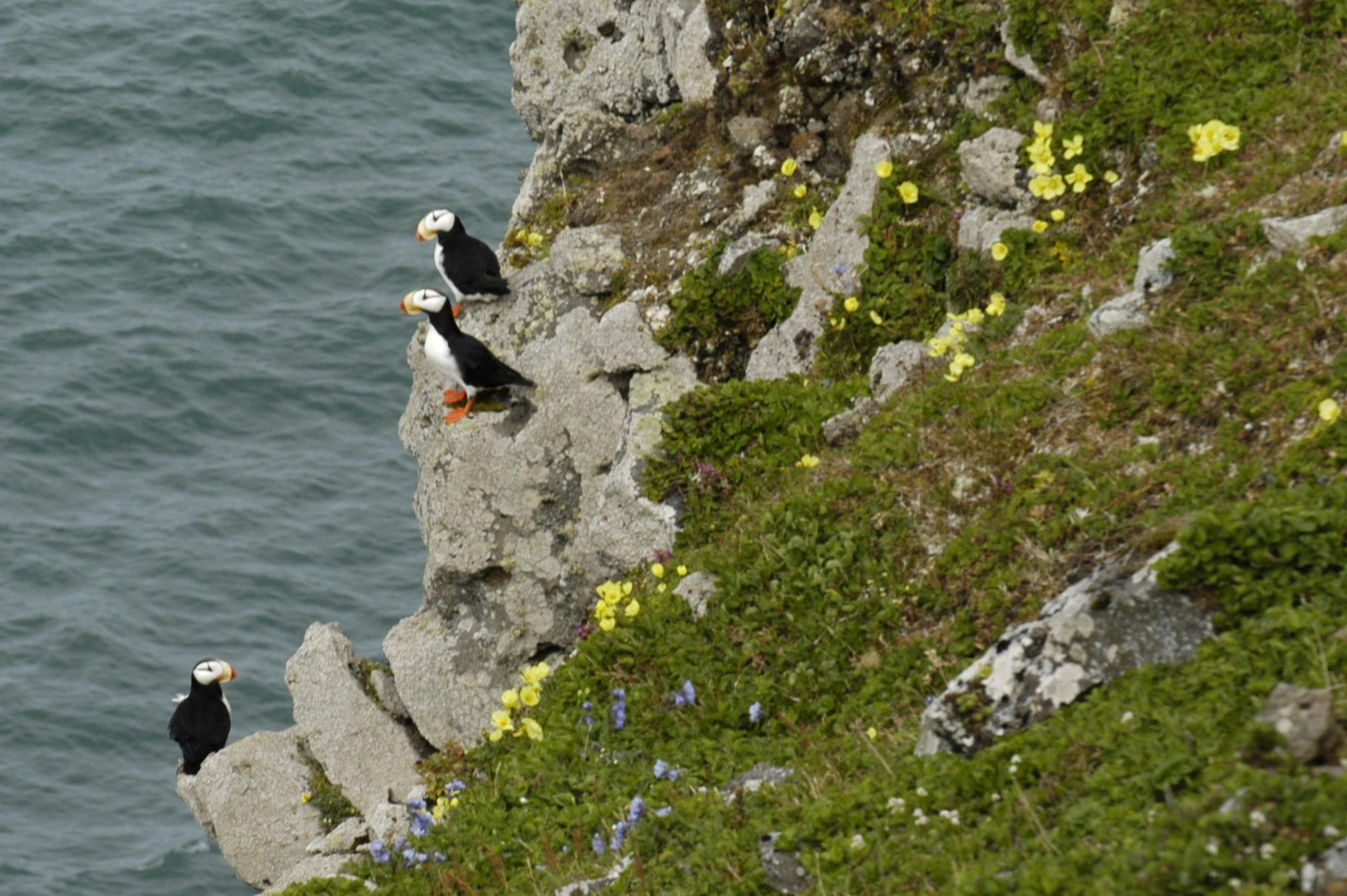
Horned puffins on a Nunivak Island sea cliff, August 2008

- Common murre or common guillemot Uria aalge (alpa ~ alpaq in Yup'ik and Cup'ik, alpa in Cup'ig)
- Pigeon guillemot Cepphus columba (ciguraq in Yup'ik and Cup'ik, cigurer in Cup'ig)
- Crested auklet Aethia cristatella (cip'lagar, cukilpag in Cup'ig)
- Horned puffin Fratercula corniculata (qilangaq, qengacuar(aq) in Yup'ik and Cup'ik, qilangar, tunngar in Cup'ig)
- Black-legged kittiwake Rissa tridactyla (naruyacuaq in Yup'ik and Cup'ik, tengaurta, tengauqsarar(ar), qarliar(ar) in Cup'ig)
- Pelagic cormorant Phalacrocorax pelagicus (uyalek in Yup'ik and Cup'ik, uyaleg in Cup'ig)
- Snowy owl Bubo scandiacus (anipa ~ anipaq in Yup'ik and Cup'ik, anipar in Cup'ig)

=== Plants ===
Berries and edible plants supplemented meals consisting mostly of fish and game. Plants foods also provided a variety of essential vitamins and nutrients to the diet. Berries were preserved by freezing. The most popular use berries was when making akutaq, a whipped mixture of the berries, sugar, and shortening or fat. Households also made jam, jellies, and breads from berries. Sourdock leaves were prepared by boiling, like spinach. Labrador tea was boiled to make tea and was consumed much like commercial teas. Green spruce needles were also used for tea.

Chuathbaluk and Sleetmute residents have harvested green plants both historically and presently for food, medicine, and ceremonial purposes. Greens are most commonly harvested and processed by females, although males and children may also participate in harvest activities. Most green plants are gathered close to the winter village and fish campsites or in the course of local boat travel. Greens are generally harvested by one or two females together during short morning or afternoon excursions for use by their household group. Formal organized gathering activities take place for the purpose of harvesting berries.

Famine foods: reindeer lichen (tuntut neqait) was soaked in seal oil or mixed with cranberries to make it taste better.

Indigenous plants were an integral part of the year-round diet of Eskimo people in addition to their incorporation in other facets of their life. Contrary to the popular perception of Eskimo people surviving solely on fish and meat, the Nunivak Cup'ig utilized a large number of local plants for food, medicinal, and utilitarian purposes.

On Nunivak, most indigenous plants were traditionally gathered by women and children when the men were harvesting other available resources (e.g., caribou, waterfowl, seal). While fresh spring greens provided a welcome addition to the diet, which in winter was based largely on dried and stored foods, other greens were harvested throughout the year as they ripened, and used with some of those stored for winter use. With the melting of the island's snow pack, local greens and berries not picked during the previous fall's harvest, begin to appear and were added to the local diet. Depending on the time the ice pack began to break up, Cup'ig families would leave their winter villages and move to spring seal camps. Cup'ig men would journey out along the ice to harvest arriving sea mammals (i.e., seals, walrus) while the women would spend much of their time harvesting available plant resources (greens and seaweeds) and shellfish. Early spring plants included: marsh marigold (Caltha palustris), sour dock (Rumex arcticus), wild celery (Angelica lucida), wild lettuce (Draba borealis or D. hyperborea), wild parsnip (Ligusticum hultonii), wild rhubarb (Polygonum viviparum), mountain sorrel (Oxyria digylla), Pallas buttercup (Ranunculus pallasii), and Labrador tea (Ledum pallustre decumbens).

After the completion of the hunting season, families would move to summer fish camps. Fish were the most prolific and essential subsistence resource for many Alaskan Natives living in the Yukon-Kuskokwim Delta region and its harvest would occupy the majority of the families' efforts for several months. Traditional plants would continue to be harvested as they ripened and. were eaten fresh or placed in underground caches for temporary storage. By late summer/early fall, several berry species (e.g., Rubus chamaemorus, R. arcticus, Empetrum nigrum) and local greens (c.g., Rumex arcticus) were ready to be harvested and women and children would spend most days on the tundra gathering plant resources.

Most plants were available in a variety of locales and their harvest did not dictate moving the family to specific camps. Plants that grew in abundance in specific terrain, such as several varieties of cliff greens, usually offered other resources that could be harvested at the same time (e.g., fish, Sandhill cranes). Greens such as Rumex arcticus (sour dock) could be found throughout the island and all old camp sites are said to contain buried cache pits once used for plant storage.

Before placing the "wild spinach" or sour dock in the caches, the cooked leaves would be drained of juice and the pit lined with woven grass mats. Berries were stored in much the same way, except that these pits would be lined with rocks. The berries would have no juice when removed, since they would have dried out while being stored underground. In the fall, people would return to their seasonal caches and transport their stored berries and greens to their winter village.

== See also ==
- Inuit diet of Canada
- Greenlandic cuisine of Greenland
- Native American cuisine includes all food practices of the indigenous peoples of the Americas such as Native Americans and Alaska Natives.
- Pacific Northwest cuisine is a North American cuisine of the states of Oregon, Washington and Alaska, as well as British Columbia and the southern Yukon.
