= Paul John (Yupik elder) =

American Yup'ik elder, cultural advocate, and commercial fisherman

Paul Joseph John (1929 – March 6, 2015) was an American Yup'ik elder, cultural advocate, and commercial fisherman. John was a proponent of traditional Central Alaskan Yup'ik culture, including the use of the Central Alaskan Yup'ik language and a subsistence lifestyle, including wild food. Additionally, John helped to settle the village of Toksook Bay, Alaska. A traditional chief of the Nunakauyarmiut tribe, he was a member of the Association of Village Council Presidents (AVCP), which is based in Bethel, Alaska.

== Early life ==
Paul John was born in the village of Old Cevv'arneq, also known as Chefornak, Alaska. He was raised in a sod house in an Alaskan village on the Bering Sea. John, who spoke very little English and conversed in fluent Central Alaskan Yup'ik language, recalled living with seals as a child to promote respect for animals. He later moved to nearby Nightmute, Alaska, to marry his wife, Martina (née Anguyaluk). In 1964, Paul and Martina John moved to Toksook Bay when the village was established.

== Contributions and Collaborations ==
Paul John, who possessed an in-depth knowledge of Yup'ik traditions and language, was featured in a number of books by Ann Fienup-Riordan, an Alaskan cultural anthropologist. John was cited dozens of times in Fienup-Riordan's book, "Yuungnaqpiallerput" ("The Way We Genuinely Live"). For example, in "Yuungnaqpiallerput", John described the qasgi, a traditional men's community house, saying "The qasgi was like college, and our elders were like our professors." He was one of the last Yup'ik who was raised with the qasgi men's house as an integral part of the village community. He recalled the qasgi as a place where the community learned "how to live and how to work." John also authored several books on Yup'ik history and folkways in his native language, composed Yup'ik songs, and created dances which are still performed.

He was also able to describe Yup'ik artifacts to researchers. He was among a group of Yup'ik who travelled to museums as far away as Berlin, New York City, and Washington D.C. to view and identify artifacts from the Yukon-Kuskokwim Delta. Additionally, he taught classes and workshops on Yup'ik crafts, dance and language to students. Paul John received an honorary doctorate from the University of Alaska Fairbanks for his promotion of Yup'ik culture.

== Leadership and legacy ==
Paul John was a commercial fisherman in Bristol Bay by profession. He was among the first village residents to compete in sled dog races in Anchorage and Bethel. He was a member of the Association of Village Council Presidents, the Inuit Circumpolar Conference, and a founding member of the board of directors of the Yukon-Kuskokwim Health Corp.

Paul John died at the Alaska Native Medical Center in Anchorage, Alaska, on March 6, 2015, at the age of 85. His illness, which required hospitalization in Anchorage, had prevented him from making a final visit to Toksook Bay. He was survived by his wife Martina (then aged 62), nine surviving children, thirty grandchildren, and thirty-five great-grandchildren. His memorial service was held at St. Anthony's Catholic Church in Anchorage on March 10, 2015. Dignitaries in attendance included Lt. Governor Byron Mallott. He was buried in Toksook Bay.
