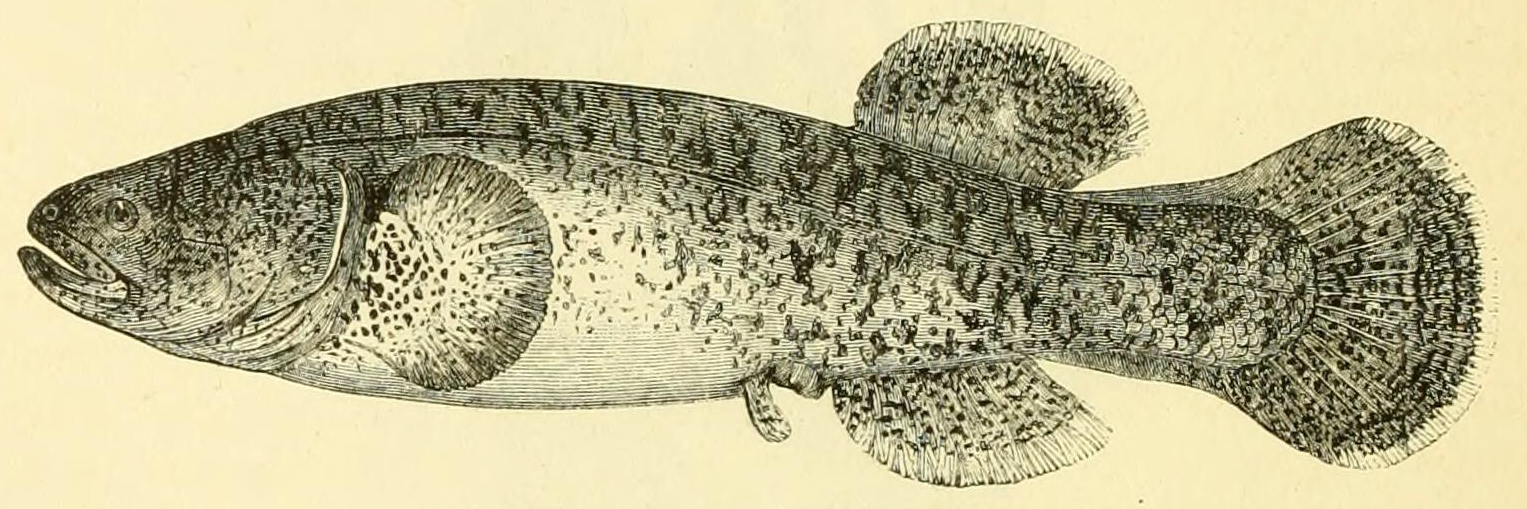
- Drawing of Dallia delicatissima, Smitt 1882.

Conservation status
- Least Concern (IUCN 3.1)

Scientific classification
- Kingdom: Animalia
- Phylum: Chordata
- Class: Actinopterygii
- Order: Salmoniformes
- Family: Esocidae
- Genus: Dallia
- Species: D. delicatissima

Binomial name
- Dallia delicatissima Smitt, 1881

= Dallia delicatissima =

Species of fish

Dallia delicatissima is a species of mudminnow in the genus Dallia of the order Esociformes. It is endemic to the Chukchi Peninsula in far eastern Siberia, Russia, being known from only two lakes of the Kolychiskaya Guba Bay basin: Pil'khykai Lagoon, and a nameless lake in the upper river Kalheurer-veyemm, flowing into the southwestern part of the Kolyuchin Bay.

== Conservation status ==
In March of 2020, the IUCN's red list assessed this species to be Least Concern due to its remote habitat and lack of use to humans.
