= Lucien M. Turner =

Lucien McShan Turner (c. 1848–1909) was an American ethnologist and naturalist.

Turner was born in about 1848. He enlisted into Army Signal Corps where he collected species that had to do with ethnology and natural history, which he kept at the Smithsonian Institution. From 1874 to 1877, he was a meteorological observer for the Alaskan Signal Service at St. Michael. From 1878 to 1881, he trained volunteers for the service on the Aleutian Islands. A year later, he was sent to Fort Chimo as an observer where he remained until his return to Washington (DC) in 1884. He died in 1909.
