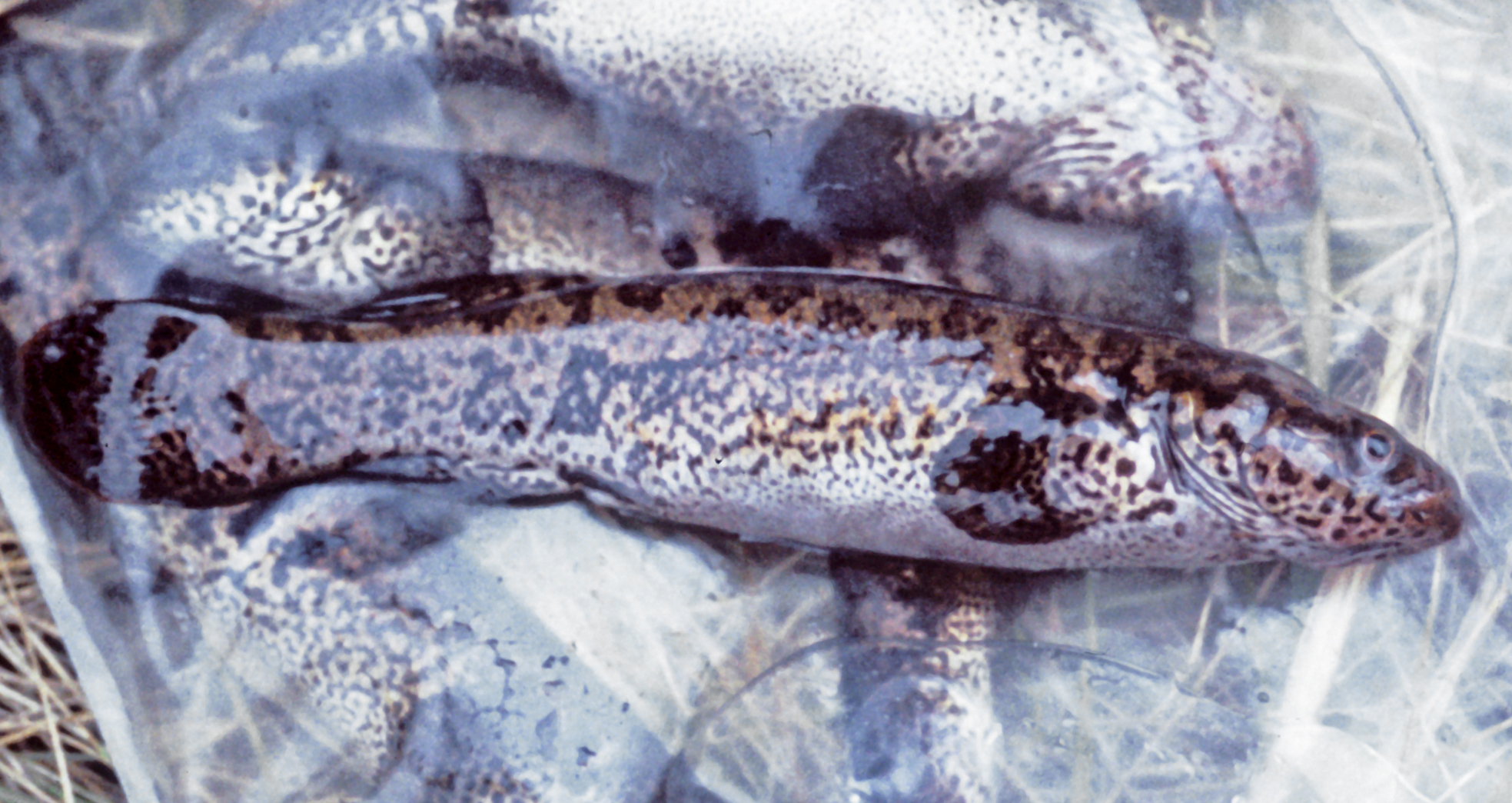

Conservation status
- Least Concern (IUCN 3.1)

- Secure (NatureServe)

Scientific classification
- Kingdom: Animalia
- Phylum: Chordata
- Class: Actinopterygii
- Order: Salmoniformes
- Family: Esocidae
- Genus: Dallia
- Species: D. pectoralis

Binomial name
- Dallia pectoralis T. H. Bean, 1880
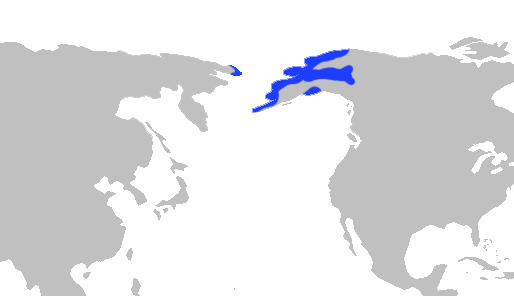
- Range of Dallia pectoralis

= Alaska blackfish =

Species of fish

The Alaska blackfish (Dallia pectoralis) is a species of freshwater fish in the esocid family (Esocidae) of order Salmoniformes. It inhabits Arctic regions of Alaska as well as Siberia and the Bering Sea islands.

== Description ==
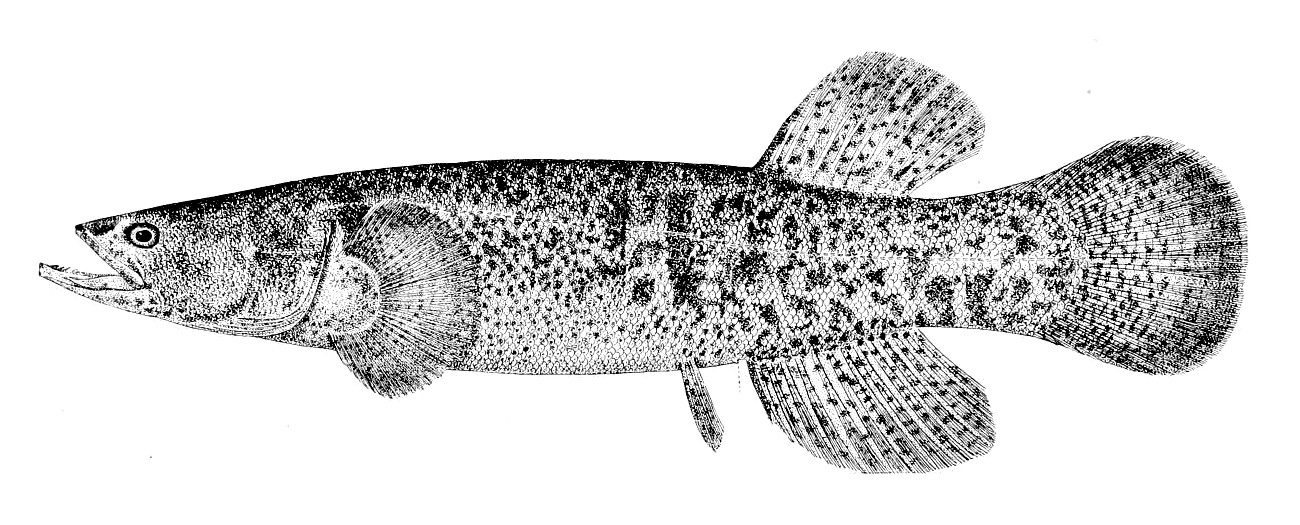
Illustration

Alaska blackfish are small, with an average length of 108 mm (4.3 in), but have been known to reach 330 mm (13 in).

They have an easily distinguishable morphology (a branch of biology dealing with the study of the form and structure of organisms and their specific structural features), with relatively large, posterior dorsal fin and anal fins, large, lobed pectoral fins located just posterior to the operculum, a diphycercal caudal fin, and small, pointy pelvic fins.

The head is broad and flat, with the trunk being long and slender. The color is dark green to brown on the dorsal side, pale below, with light-colored blotches appearing laterally.

Males can be distinguished from females by the presence of a reddish fringe along the dorsal, caudal, and anal fins; also, the tips of the ventral fins extend beyond the anal fin in males, whereas in females they do not.

The Alaska blackfish is famous for its ability to breathe atmospheric oxygen through a modified esophagus. Specifically, the esophagus of a blackfish can be subdivided into a non-respiratory and a respiratory section. The respiratory section can be identified by its extensive mucosal folding and vascularization, as well as widespread capillaries throughout the epithelium. This respiratory structure implies selection pressures for the development of a purely respiratory organ and a purely hydrostatic organ. Another factor is the retention of the hydrostatic swim bladder, which seems unnecessary unless it is important in maintaining neutral buoyancy in the cold winter months under ice cover.

== Distribution, location and habitat ==
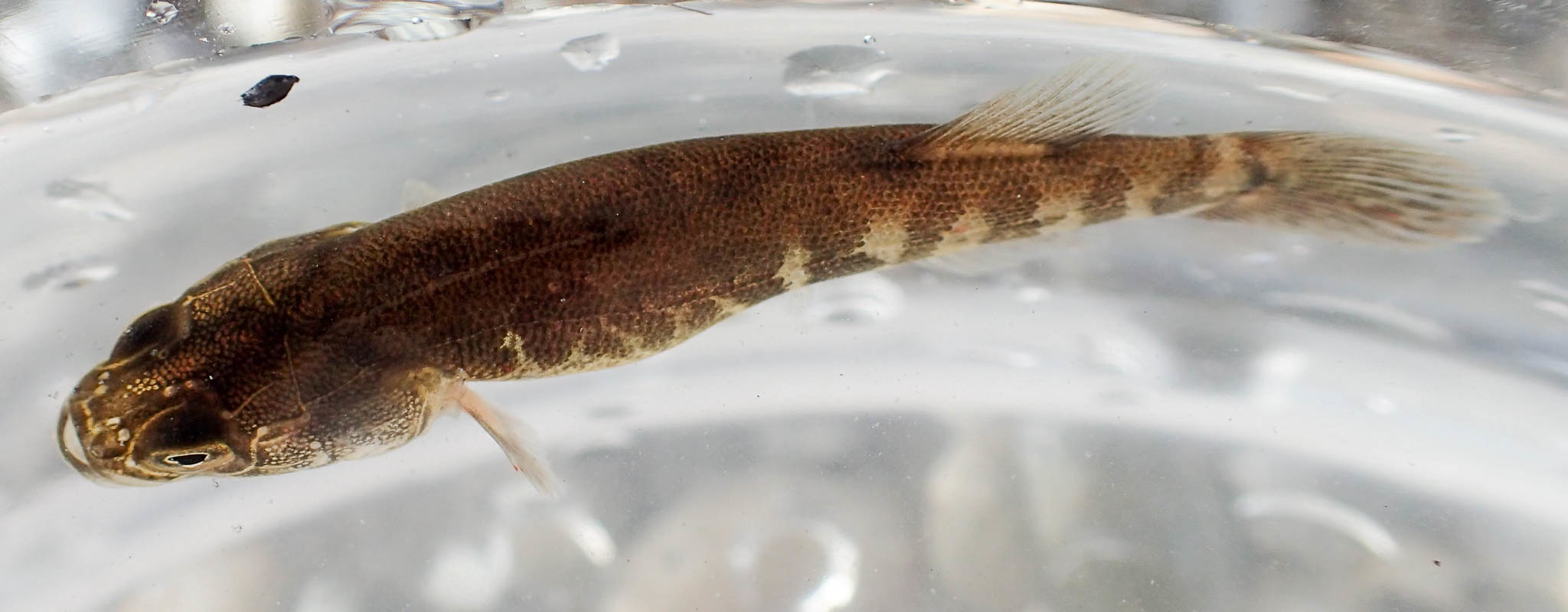
Dorsal view

Alaska blackfish can be found in the Bering Sea islands, Siberia, and Alaska. In Alaska, they inhabit the Colville Delta south to the central Alaska Peninsula near Chignik as well as the upstream Yukon-Tanana drainage to near Fairbanks.

Blackfish are found in highly vegetated swamps and ponds, occasionally residing in rivers and densely-vegetated lakes, where in summer, water is frequently stagnant. Spawning migrations are limited to inshore and upstream movements in the spring, and reverse migrations to deeper water in the fall.

In the winter-time, blackfish tend to reside in the benthic regions of lakes, although when oxygen availability reaches a certain minimum, blackfish move to the surface, grouping around breathing holes. These breathing areas can be preexisting holes, such as those created by muskrats, beavers, and fishers, or simply thin layers of ice. Blackfish have been observed schooling below the ice, and when swimming upwards to breathe, eat away at the ice and creating an audible snapping or sucking sound. The Alaska blackfish is known for its tolerance of cold water, and has been reported to survive exposure to −20 °C (−4 °F) for 40 minutes. Despite its hardiness, Alaska blackfish have been observed to suffer edema and mass mortality events during the winter.

== Feeding and diet ==
The principal source of food for blackfish is aquatic insects and invertebrates, although in Bristol Bay, larger blackfish have been observed to be cannibalistic, as well as predators of young pike. Blackfish are generalist feeders, and have been analyzed to have contained algae, snails, dipteran larvae, ostracods, copepods, and caddisfly larvae in their stomachs.

== Reproduction ==
Spawning occurs from May to August, with fish having the ability to spawn several times; thus, females do not usually expel their entire egg contents in a single event.

A female, depending on her size, can release a total of 40–300 eggs at intervals during the spawning period, with the eggs then attaching to vegetation and hatching in a short period of time (nine days at 12 °C (54 °F)). When the young hatch, they are approximately 6 mm in length, and survive off the yolk sac for an average period of 10 days.

Rate of growth varies throughout Alaska, with blackfish from Interior Alaska and the Anchorage area being about 108 mm (4.3 in) at age 2, 138 mm (5.4 in) at age 3, and 178 mm (7.0 in) at age 4. On the other hand, Bristol Bay blackfish are much slower growing and longer lived. Four-year-old fish are approximately 64 mm (2.5 in) in length, but can live up to 8 years. Female blackfish have been shown to reach sexual maturity at 80 mm (3.1 in).

== Importance to humans ==
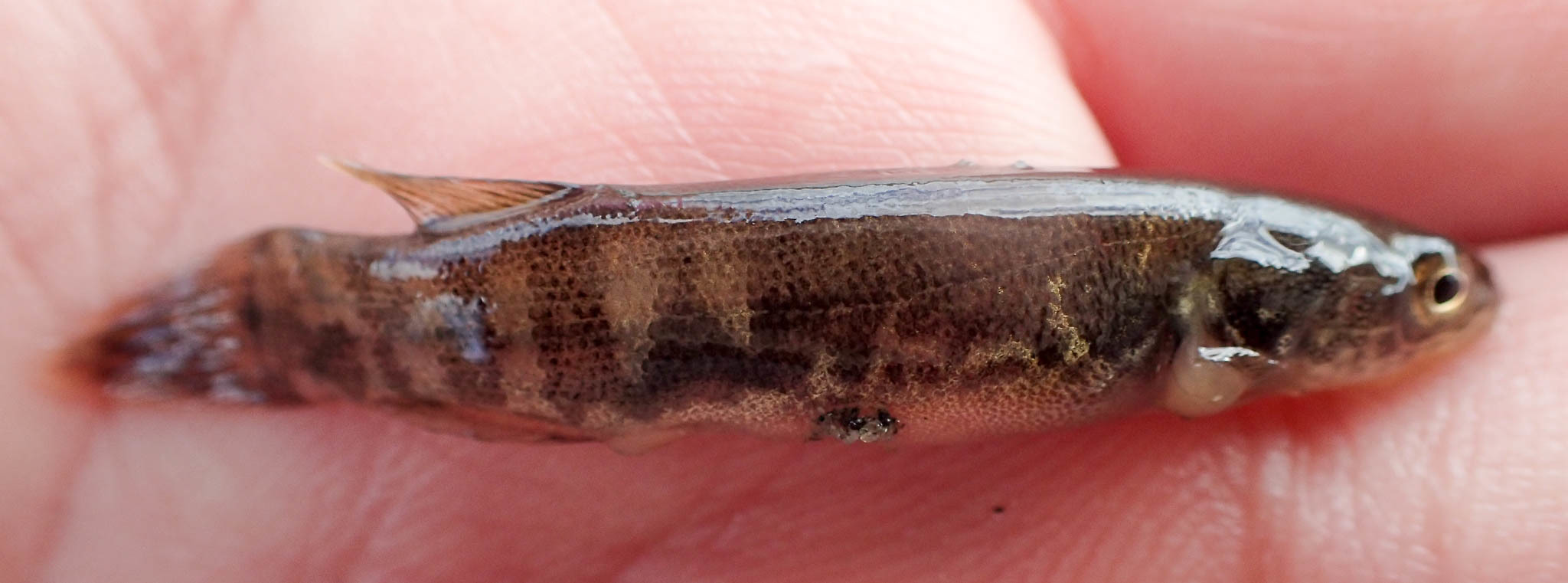
In hand

The Alaska blackfish is an important subsistence fish for Native communities residing in the Interior and Western Alaska, specifically those residing in Interior Alaska. Although generally small (average size is 108 mm (4.3 in)), their significance comes in their high nutritional value and large abundance in the winter, a generally lean time of year.

When oxygen levels in the benthic regions of lakes becomes low, blackfish move to the surface to obtain atmospheric oxygen, thus making ice fishing an easy method of capture; blackfish are commonly stored, frozen, and then fed to dogs. In 1886, Lucien Turner reported an account of a frozen blackfish reviving after being thawed in a dog's stomach causing it to be regurgitated. Metabolic and survival studies have been conducted have repeatedly failed to replicate this observation, finding that blackfish have no ability to revive any part of their body that had been frozen.

== Conservation status ==
The Alaska blackfish is not International Union for Conservation of Nature-listed as an endangered or threatened species. While blackfish are native to Western Alaska as well as the Interior, they were introduced to the Cook Inlet Basin of Alaska in the 1950s, and have since become widespread. A study performed by Eidam et al. (2016) in three study sites in the Cook Inlet Basin concluded that an insignificant portion of their diet was fish, meaning blackfish are unlikely to impact native and stocked fish in those populations. While that information is helpful for determining whether blackfish are truly invasive, it is not all-encompassing for other blackfish populations in the area. Further studies are warranted that estimate the abundance of introduced blackfish in lakes and streams in the Cook Inlet Basin, as well as investigate potential dietary overlap with other fish.

== Phylogeography and population genetics ==
Molecular study of Alaska blackfish across its range has identified several geographic areas where Alaska blackfish persisted during glacial episodes. Genetic structuring within the species is relatively high for a fish species from northern latitudes, most likely reflecting biological characteristics such as poor dispersal ability and winter survival.
