= Mousefood =

Method of harvesting food via mice

Mousefood, Melqurat, Maqaruaruat or Anlleq is a native foraged food and medicine highly prized by Yupik people on the Yukon-Kuskokwim Delta.

== Foraging ==
Mousefood consists of the roots of various tundra plants which are cached by voles, lemmings, or occasionally weasels in burrows. People forage and eat, raw or in dishes, the food that the "mice" have harvested and stored. In autumn they are often located as a result of the softened ground caused by a cache. Elders teach that when collecting mousefood, one should always leave half of the cache for the "mouse". They also recommend leaving a small gift – something that the "mouse" can eat such as dried fish. Some Yupiit observe personalities from caches, noting some to be "lazy" and others "clean", even telling stories of the scolding of "lazy mice".

== Species ==
Various species of tundra plants may be foraged as mousefood. The roots of tall cottongrass, white cottongrass and Russett cottongrass are less than an inch long. They are eaten, put in soup, or used medicinally with seal oil. "Eskimo sweet potatoes" are the roots of Hedysarum alpinum. As the name suggests, these roots are somewhat sweet and are used in Akutaq.
