= Odd F. Lindberg =

Norwegian journalist (1945–2021)

- Born: Odd Freddy Lindberg; 1945
- Died: 8 November 2021 (aged 76)
- Spouse: Marit Lindberg
- Children: Andrea and Amund

Odd Freddy Lindberg (1945 – 8 November 2021) was a Norwegian freelance journalist, Arctic explorer and film maker. He was an activist against sealing and whaling.

== Sealing report in Bladet Tromsø ==
Lindberg had been making documentaries and worked as a journalist, author and photographer until 1988, when he gave an official report to the Norwegian Ministry of Fisheries and Coastal Affairs about what he believed to be illegal conditions in the seal hunt. The report was published in full on 20 July 1988 in the newspaper Bladet Tromsø, even though the Norwegian Ministry of Fisheries and Coastal Affairs had kept it from the public.

The "Lindberg case" questioned the freedom of speech in Norway, and particularly its position regarding privacy, in this case the privacy of the seal hunters who had participated in what at the time was internationally largely regarded as inhumane and brutal slaughtering of seal pups (whitecoats) with hakapik. In his 1988 report, Lindberg claimed that seals were skinned alive and that sealers knowingly inflicted suffering on the seal.

The newspaper was sued by the seal hunters, and sentenced in two court rounds to pay compensation. The Supreme Court of Norway turned the case down, and the ruling stood until the European Court of Human Rights in Strasbourg reversed it in May 1999. The ruling from Strasbourg expanded the Norwegian media's rights to publicize public documents even if these can be a burden to individuals.

== Lindberg's documentary ==
Lindberg made a documentary while he was a volunteer sealing inspector on the vessel Harmoni. The documentary, Seal Mourning, had its premiere on the Norwegian television station NRK on 9 February 1989, when the channel showed clips from the film. The negative attention Lindberg received from both seal hunters and the Norwegian government, as well as the public at large, was eventually so intense that he chose to move out of the country and settled abroad, in Sweden, with his wife and two children; he later moved back to Norway. The Norwegian foreign minister at the time, Thorvald Stoltenberg, called Lindberg up in February 1989, warning him not to let his documentary be shown on CNN because of national interests, and that the whole government stood behind him in this message to Lindberg. Lindberg taped this phonecall. (The taping would later be part of one of Lindberg's documentaries). Stoltenberg also sent the attorney general to NRK to censor material given to CNN. Lindberg eventually stopped the whole film from being broadcast on CNN, afraid to do otherwise. Clips from the film were shown on CNN, the BBC and 18 other broadcasting companies worldwide. The documentary was broadcast in its entirety by a Swedish television channel on 11 February 1989.

== Swedish documentary ==
In 1994 the Norwegian television station TV2's TV documentary series Dokument2 showed a Swedish documentary, En Folkefiende - sälfångstinspektören som tvingades i exil (en. An Enemy of the People - the Sealing Inspector Who was Forced into Exile) that strongly criticized Norway's treatment of Lindberg and accused Norway of allowing libel charges to stop an important debate. Then the editorial office for Document2 was also sued for libel. A group of seal hunters reacted to the fact that the program showed pictures of them while they were hunting seals. The pictures were taken by sealing inspector Lindberg, who claimed that these pictures documented illegal hunting methods. A court had earlier ruled in favor of the seal hunters that the images constituted libel and forbidden the showing of the images. Dokument2's editor Gerard Helskog argued that the public had a right to know what happened on the hunting grounds, and won completely in Bergen City Court. The ruling marked an expansion of freedom of speech in Norway.

== See also ==
- Seal hunting
