= White coat (disambiguation) =

A white coat is an overcoat or smock worn by medics and scientists.

White coat may also refer to:

- White coat ceremony, a relatively new ritual in some medical schools and pharmacy schools
- White coat hypertension, a phenomenon in which patients exhibit elevated blood pressure in a clinical setting but not when recorded by themselves at home
- White-coated titi, Callicebus pallescens, a species of titi, a type of New World monkey
- Intern Academy, a Canadian movie named White Coats in the United States
- "White Coats", a song by Foxes from Glorious
- Whitecoat, a newborn harp or grey seal with soft, white fur
- Operation Whitecoat, a secret operation carried out by the US Army during the period 1954-1973
