= Seal hunting =

Personal or commercial hunting of marine mammal

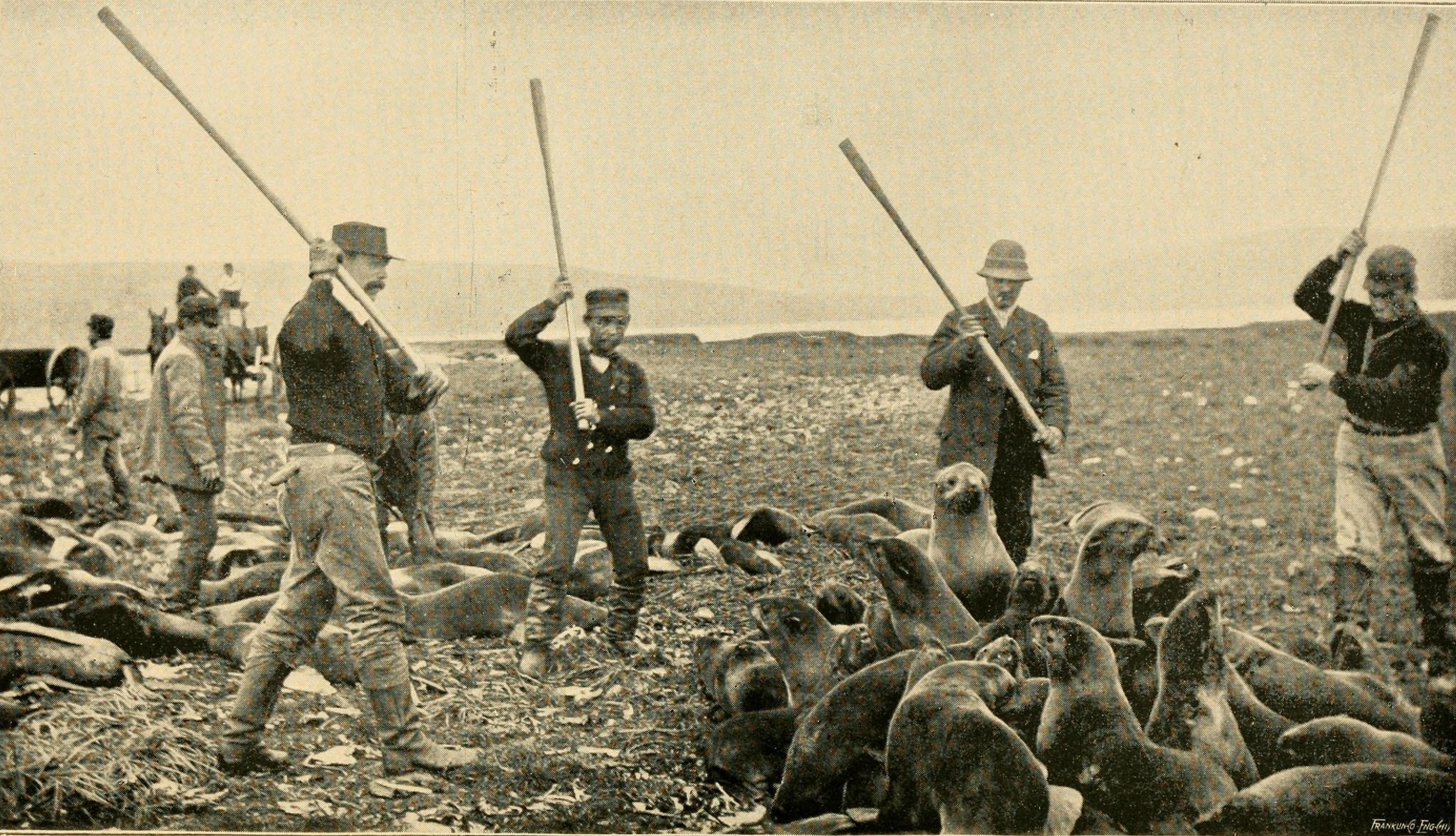
Killing fur seals on St. Paul Island, Alaska Territory, 1890s

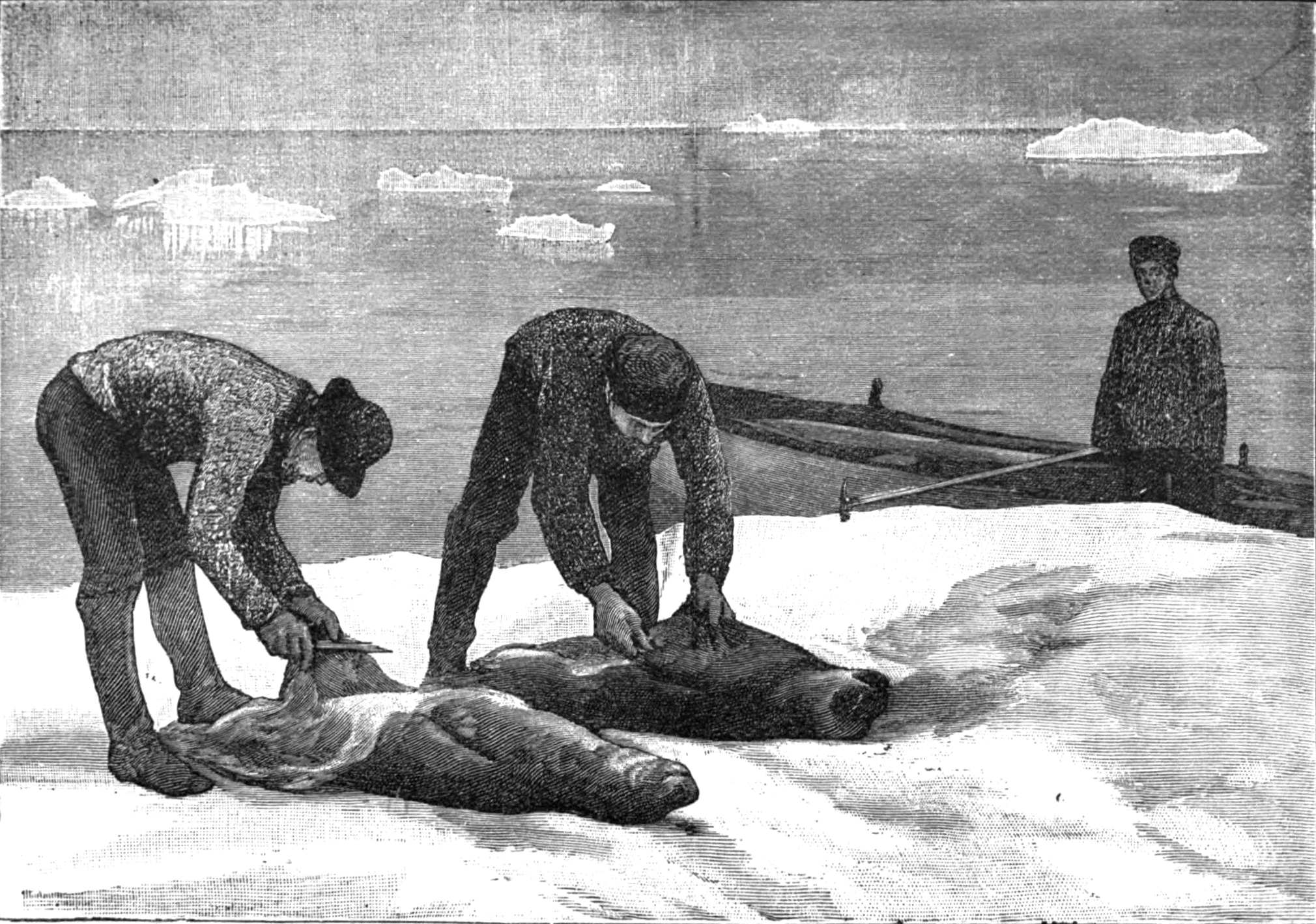
Seal skinning in the 1880s by members of the Nansen expedition to Greenland

Seals are hunted in nine countries: Canada, Denmark (in self-governing Greenland only), Russia, the United States (above the Arctic Circle in Alaska), Namibia, Estonia, Norway, Finland and Sweden. Most of the world's seal hunting takes place in Canada and Greenland.

The Canadian Department of Fisheries and Oceans (DFO) regulates the seal hunt in Canada. It sets quotas in the form of a total allowable catch (TAC), monitors the hunt, studies the seal population, works with the Canadian Sealers' Association to train sealers on new regulations, and promotes sealing through its website and spokespeople. The DFO set harvest quotas of over 90,000 seals in 2007; 275,000 in 2008; 280,000 in 2009; and 330,000 in 2010. The actual kills in recent years have been less than the quotas: 82,800 in 2007; 217,800 in 2008; 72,400 in 2009; and 67,000 in 2010. In 2007, Norway reported that 29,000 harp seals were killed, Russia reported that 5,479 seals were killed and Greenland reported that 90,000 seals were killed in their respective seal hunts.

Harp seal populations in the northwest Atlantic declined to approximately 2 million in the late 1960s as a result of Canada's annual kill rates, which averaged to over 291,000 from 1952 to 1970. Conservationists demanded reduced rates of killing and stronger regulations to avert the extinction of the harp seal. In 1971, the Canadian government responded by instituting a quota system. The system was competitive, with each boat catching as many seals as it could before the hunt closed, which the Department of Fisheries and Oceans did when they knew that year's quota had been reached. Because it was thought that the competitive element might cause sealers to cut corners, new regulations were introduced that limited the catch to 400 seals per day, and 2000 per boat total. A 2007 population survey conducted by the DFO estimated the population at 5.5 million.

As of 2024, the population was estimated at 4.4 million seals, a notable decline since 2019 when the population was at an estimated 5.6 million. Under the revised Atlantic Seal Management Strategy, the estimated 2024 total abundance of Northwest Atlantic harp seals is considered to be in the "Cautious Zone", a classification based on an 80% probability that the population is currently below the Precautionary Reference point of 4.8 million seals. The decline in the harp seal population since 2019 suggests that recent environmental conditions, particularly sea ice availability, could be exerting a substantial influence. The Department of Fisheries and Oceans (DFO) acknowledges that future harvest projections assume consistent ice conditions, and that predicted environmental changes could lead to further population declines and lower sustainable harvest levels.

In Greenland, hunting is done with a firearm (rifle or shotgun) and young are fully protected. This has caused some conflicts with other seal-hunting nations, as Greenlanders sometimes boycotted the product of seals (often young) killed by clubbing or similar methods, which have not been in use in Greenland. It is illegal in Canada to hunt newborn harp seals (whitecoats) and young hooded seals (bluebacks). When the seal pups begin to molt their downy white fur at the age of 12–14 days, they are called ragged-jacket and can be commercially hunted. After molting, the seals are called beaters, named for the way they beat the water with their flippers. The hunt remains highly controversial, attracting significant media coverage and protests each year. Images from past hunts have become iconic symbols for conservation, animal welfare, and animal rights advocates. In 2009, Russia banned the hunting of harp seals less than one year old.

== Terminology ==
The term seal is used to refer to a diverse group of animals. In science, they are grouped together in the pinnipeds, which also includes the walrus, not popularly thought of as a seal, and not considered here. The two main families of seals are the Otariidae (the eared seals; includes sea lions, and fur seals), and Phocidae (the earless seals); animals in the family Phocidae were sometimes referred to as hair seals, and are better adapted for a fully aquatic lifestyle than the eared seals, though they have a more difficult time getting around on land.

== Uses ==
The fur seal yields a valuable fur; the hair seal has no fur, but oil can be obtained from its fat and leather from its hide. Seals have been used for their pelts, their flesh, and their fat, which was often used as lamp fuel, lubricants, cooking oil, a constituent of soap, the liquid base for red ochre paint, and for processing materials such as leather and jute. Pinseal was fashioned into handbags, and seal livers were an early source of insulin. Early commercial sealers discarded most of the flesh, but might save seal hearts and flippers for an evening meal.

== History ==
=== Traditional seal hunting ===
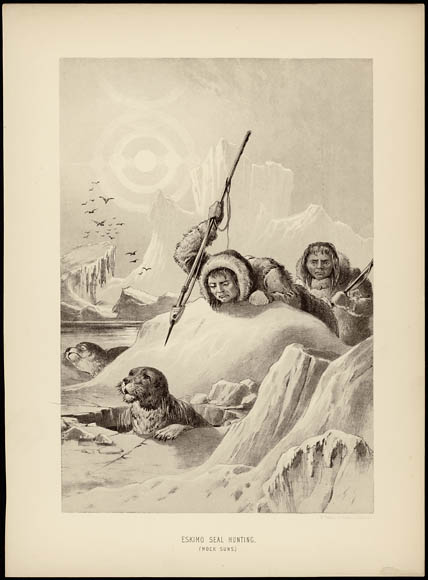
Inuit seal hunting

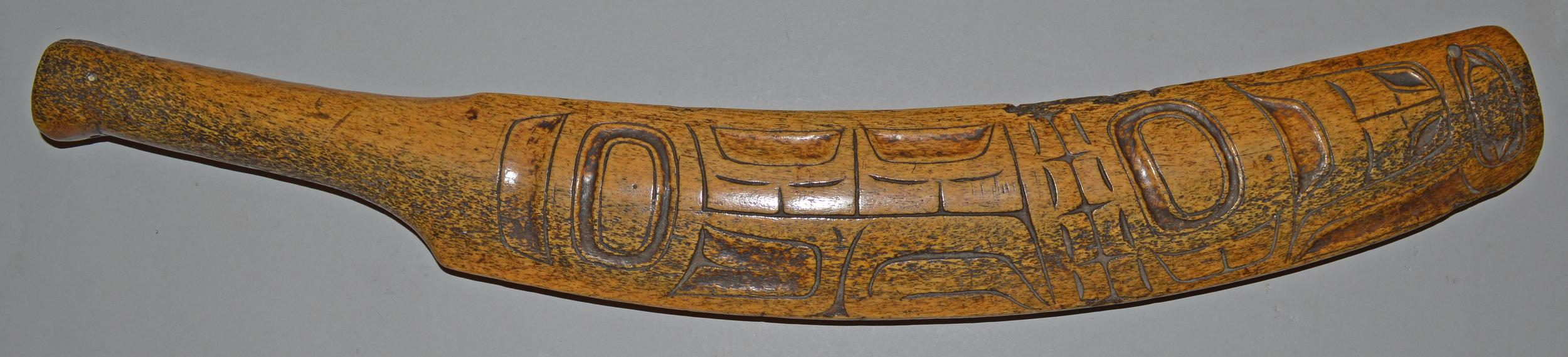
A seal-killing club made of bone from the Pacific Northwest at the British Museum.

The Gorham's Cave complex in Gibraltar shows evidence of seal hunting by Neanderthals during the Middle Paleolithic. Bones of immature Mediterranean monk seals showing signs of butchering have been recovered from multiple archaeological layers, suggesting an established practice of seasonal hunting to exploit the animals' greater vulnerability during their breeding season. Ringed seal limb bones were also excavated from the Neanderthal site at Gruta da Figueira Brava, in Portugal.

Archeological evidence indicates the Native Americans and First Nations and Inuit in Canada have been hunting seals for at least 4,000 years. Traditionally, when an Inuk boy killed his first seal or caribou, a feast was held. The meat was an important source of fat, protein, vitamin A, vitamin B_{12} and iron, and the pelts were prized for their warmth. The Inuit diet is rich in fish, whale, and seal.

There were approximately 150,000 circumpolar Inuit in 2005 in Greenland, Alaska, Russia, and Canada. According to Kirt Ejesiak, former secretary and chief of staff to then-Premier of Nunavut, Paul Okalik and the first Inuk from Nunavut to attend Harvard, for the approximately 46,000 Canadian Inuit, the seal was not "just a source of cash through fur sales, but the keystone of their culture." Although Inuit harvest and hunt many species that inhabit the desert tundra and ice platforms, the seal is their mainstay. The Inuktitut vocabulary designates specific objects made from seal bone, sinew, fat and fur used as tools, games, thread, cords, fuel, clothing, boats, and tents. There are also words referring to seasons, topography, place names, legends, and kinship relationships based on the seal. One region of Canada's north is inhabited by the Netsilik (Netsilingmiut, or 'people of the seal'). The title of Ejesiak's article acknowledged the pivotal 1991 publication entitled Animal Rights, Human Rights by George Wenzel, a McGill University geographer and anthropologist who worked more than two decades with the Clyde Inuit of Baffin Island. Wenzel's "scholarly examination" of "the impact of the animal rights movement upon the culture and economy of the Canadian Inuit" was among the first to reveal how animal rights groups, "well-meaning people in the dominant society through misunderstanding and ignorance can inflict destruction" on a vulnerable minority.

Traditional Inuit seal hunting accounts for just three percent of the total seal hunt; it was excluded from the European Commission's call in 2006 for a ban on the import, export and sale of all harp and hooded seal products. Ringed seals were once the main staple for food, and have been used for clothing, boots, fuel for lamps, as delicacy, containers, igloo windows, and in harnesses for huskies. Though no longer used to this extent, ringed seals are still an important food and clothing source for the people of Nunavut. Called nayiq by the Central Alaskan Yup'ik people, the ringed seal is also hunted and eaten in Alaska.

Various seal species were also hunted in northwest Europe and the Baltic Sea at least 8,000 years ago.

=== Early modern era ===
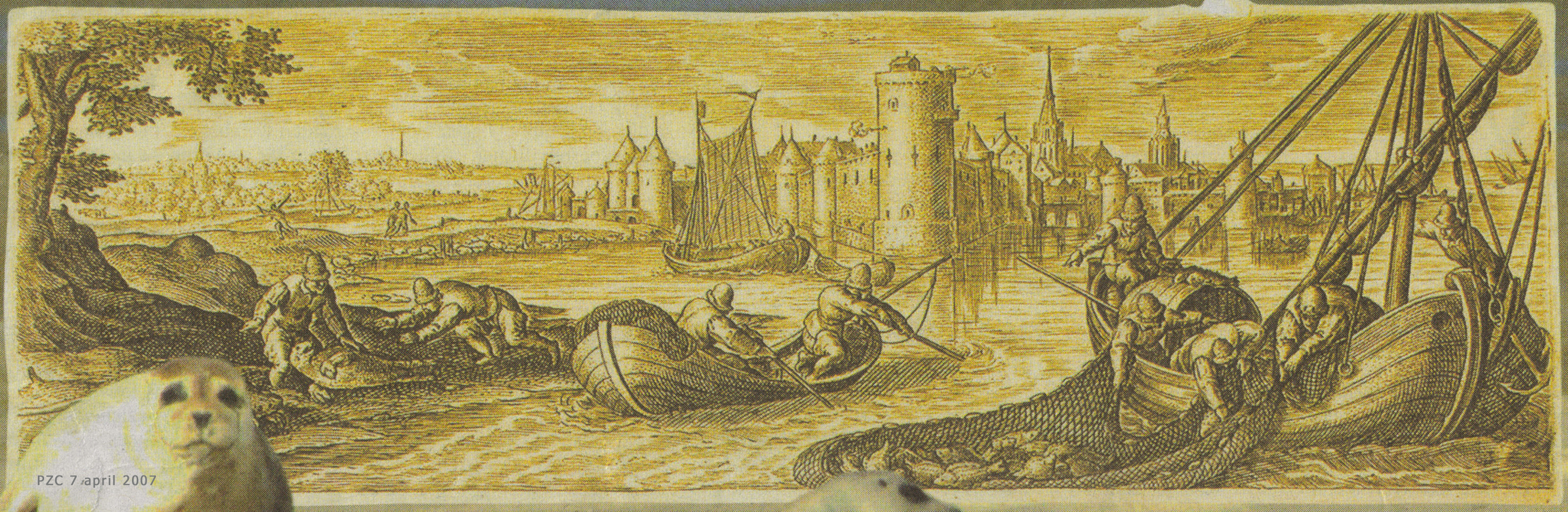
Seal hunting in Reimerswaal

The first commercial hunting of seals by Europeans, is said to have occurred in 1515, when a cargo of fur seal skins from Uruguay was sent to Spain for sale in the markets of Seville.

==== Newfoundland ====
Newfoundland and Labrador and the Gulf of St. Lawrence were the first regions to experience large scale sealing. Migratory fishermen began the hunting from as early as the 1500s. Large-scale commercial seal hunting became an annual event starting in 1723 and expanded rapidly near the turn of the 18th century. Initially, the method used was to ensnare the migrating seals in nets anchored to shore installations, known as the 'landsman seal fishery'. The hunt was mainly for the procurement of seal meat as a form of sustenance for the settlements in the area, rather than for commercial gain.

From the early 18th century English hunters began to range further afield – 1723 marked the first time that hunters armed with firearms ventured forth in boats to increase their haul. This soon became a sophisticated commercial operation; the seals were transported back to England, where the seal's meat, fur, and oil were sold separately. From 1749, the import of seal oil to England was being recorded annually, and was used as lighting oil, for cooking, in the manufacture of soap and for the treating of leather.

==== South Atlantic ====
It was in the South Seas that sealing became a major enterprise from the late 18th century. Samuel Enderby, along with Alexander Champion and John St Barbe organized the first commercial expedition to the South Atlantic Ocean in 1776, initially with the primary aim of whaling, although sealing began to play a prominent part in the operation as well. More expeditions were sent in 1777 and 1778 before political and economic troubles hampered the trade for some time.

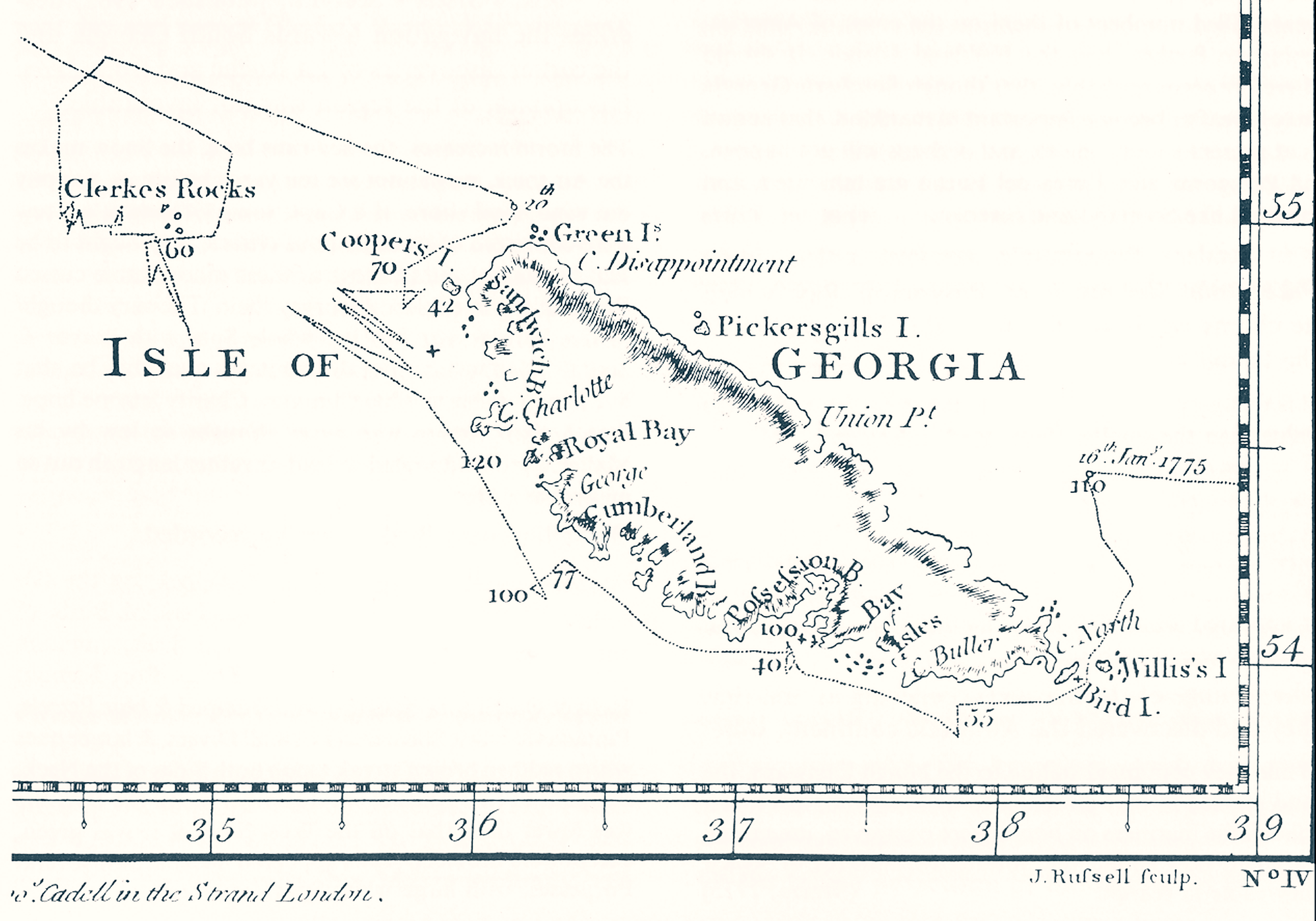
South Georgia island became a centre for the sealing industry from the late 18th century, shortly after it was mapped by Captain James Cook in 1777.

On 1 September 1788, the 270-ton ship Emilia, owned by Samuel Enderby & Sons and commanded by Captain James Shields, departed London. The ship went west around Cape Horn into the Pacific Ocean to become the first ship of any nation to conduct operations in the Southern Ocean. Emilia returned to London on 12 March 1790 with a cargo of 141 tonnes (311,000 lb) of sperm oil.

By 1784, the British had fifteen ships in the southern fishery, all from London. By 1790 this port alone had sixty vessels employed in the trade. Between 1793 and 1799 there was an average of sixty vessels in the trade. The average increased to seventy-two in the years between 1800 and 1809.

The sealing industry extended further south to South Georgia island, first mapped by Captain James Cook in HMS Resolution on 17 January 1775. During the late 18th century and throughout the 19th century, South Georgia was inhabited by English and Yankee sealers, who used to live there for considerable periods of time and sometimes overwintered. In 1778, English sealers brought back from the Island of South Georgia and the Magellan Strait area as many as 40,000 seal skins and 2,800 tonnes (6.3 million pounds) of elephant seal oil. More fur seals from the island were taken in 1786 by the English sealing vessel Lord Hawkesbury, and by 1791, 102 vessels, manned by 3,000 sealers, were hunting seals south of the equator. The first commercial visit to the South Sandwich Islands was made in 1816 by another English ship, the Ann.

The sealers pursued their trade in a most unsustainable manner, promptly reducing the fur seal population to near extermination. As a result, sealing activities on South Georgia had three marked peaks in 1786–1802, 1814–23, and 1869–1913 respectively, decreasing in between and gradually shifting to elephant seals taken for oil. Following the discovery of the South Shetland Islands in 1819, the sealing grounds were expanded to what is now the Antarctic Treaty area.

==== Pacific ====
Commercial sealing in the Australasian region appears to have started with the London-based Massachusetts-born Eber Bunker, master of the William and Ann, who in November 1791 announced his intention to visit and hunt in New Zealand's Dusky Sound. Captain William Raven of the Britannia stationed a party at Dusky from 1792 to 1793, but the discovery in 1798-1799 of Bass Strait, between mainland Australia and Van Diemen's Land (present-day Tasmania) saw the sealers' focus shift there in 1798, when a gang including Daniel Cooper landed from the Nautilus on Cape Barren Island.

With Bass Strait over-exploited by 1802, commercial attention returned to southern New Zealand waters, where Stewart Island/Rakiura and Foveaux Strait were explored, exploited and charted from 1803 to 1804. Thereafter, the sealing-industry focus shifted to the sub-Antarctic Antipodes Islands, 1805–1807, the Auckland Islands from 1806, the southeast coast of New Zealand's South Island, Otago Harbour and Solander Island by 1809, before focusing further to the south at Campbell Island (discovered in January 1810) and Macquarie Island (discovered in July 1810). During this period sealers were active on the southern coast of mainland Australia, for example at Kangaroo Island. This whole development has been called the first sealing boom; it sparked the Sealers' War (1810–1821) in southern New Zealand.

Australasian sealing measured its output in terms of skins.

By about 1815, sealing in the Pacific had faded in importance. A brief revival occurred from 1823, but this proved very short-lived. Although highly profitable at times and affording New South Wales one of its earliest trade staples, sealing's unregulated character saw its self-destruction. Notable traders from Britain and based in Australia included Simeon Lord, Henry Kable, James Underwood and Robert Campbell.

By 1830, most Pacific seal-stocks had been seriously depleted, and Lloyd's Register of Shipping only showed one full-time sealing vessel on its books. In the North Pacific, the later 1800s saw large harvests of fur seals. These harvests decreased along with fur-seal populations.

=== Industrial era ===
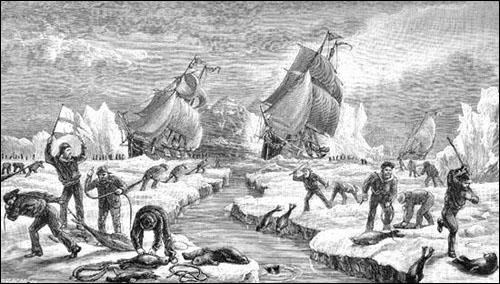
Seal hunting in Newfoundland in the 1880s.

Growing from the international Grand Banks fishery, the Newfoundland hunt initially used small schooners. Kill rates averaged 451,000 in the 1830s, and rose to 546,000 annually during the first half of the next decade, which led to a marked decline in the harp seal population that in turn adversely impacted profits in the sealing industry.

Four hundred schooners carried 13,000 Newfoundland sealers on the annual hunts of the 1850s. An annual kill of 700,000 was estimated when sealing reached its peak in Newfoundland in the 1860s, with the introduction of more powerful and reliable steamships that were capable of much larger range and storing capacity. Annual catches exceeded the 400,000 mark from the 1870s and smaller sealers were steadily pushed out of the market.

The first modern sealing ship was the SS Bear, built in Dundee, Scotland in 1874 as a steamer for sealing. The ship was custom-built for sealing out of St. John's, Newfoundland, and was the most outstanding sealing vessel of her day and the lead ship in a new generation of sealers. Heavy-built with 15-centimetre-thick (6-inch) wooden planks, Bear was rigged as a sailing barquentine but her main power was a steam engine designed to smash deep into ice packs to reach seal herds.

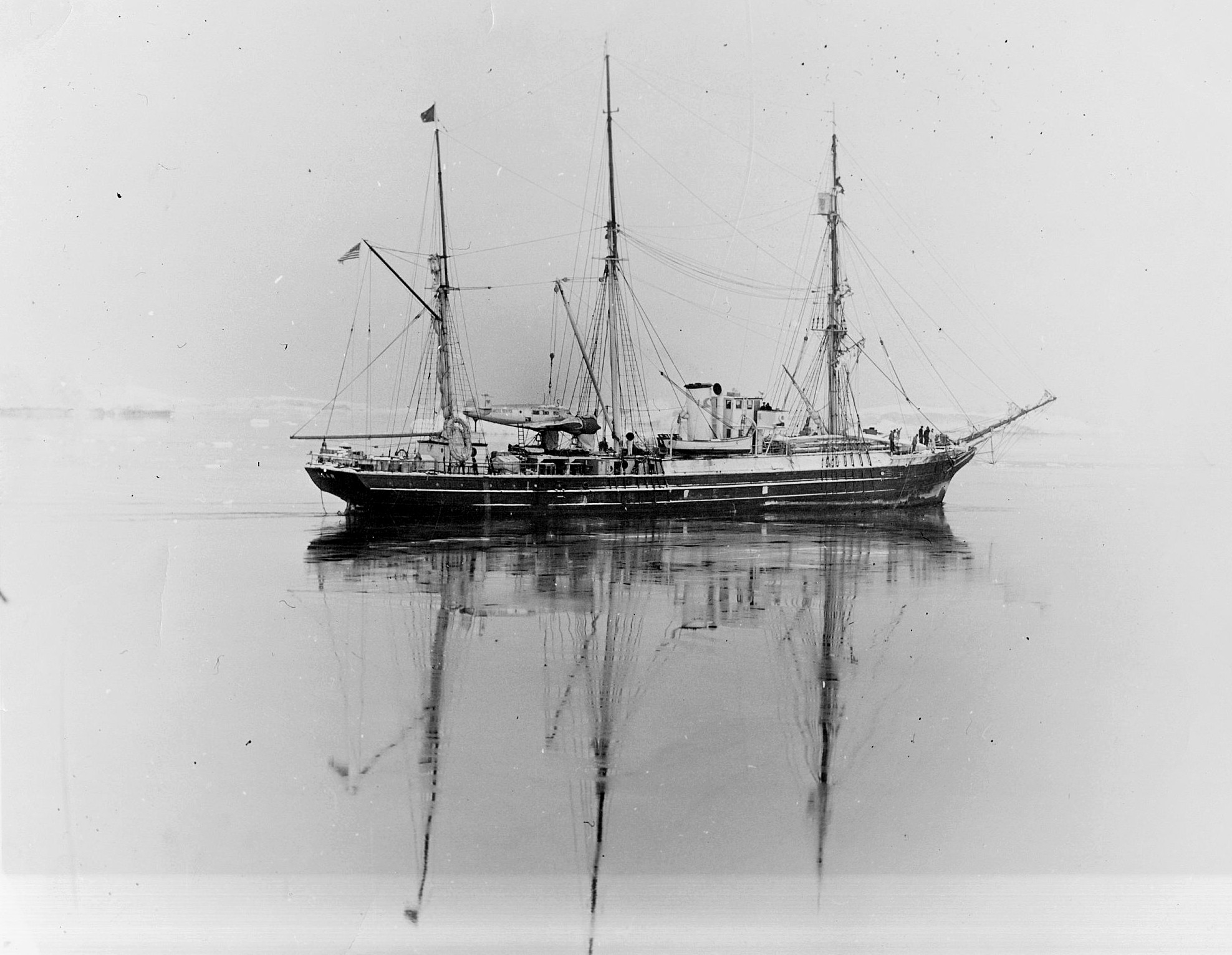
The SS Bear began sealing operations in the 1870s and radically transformed the industry.

At the time of her arrival in St. John's, there were 300 vessels outfitted each season to hunt seals, but most were small schooners or old sailing barques. The new sealing ships represented by Bear radically transformed the Eastern North Atlantic seal fishery as they replaced the hundreds of smaller sealing vessels owned by merchants in outports around Newfoundland with large and expensive steamships owned by large British and Newfoundland companies based in St. John's. Owned at first by the Scottish firm W. Grieve and Sons, she was acquired in 1880 by R. Steele Junior.

Another famous sealing ship of the era was the Terra Nova, originally built in 1884 for the Dundee whaling and sealing fleet. She was ideally suited to the polar regions and worked for 10 years in the annual seal fishery in the Labrador Sea. Large and expensive ships required major capital investments from British and Newfoundland firms, and shifted the industry from merchants in small outports to companies based in St. John's, Newfoundland. By the late 19th century, the sealing industry in Newfoundland was second in importance only to cod fishing.

The seal hunt provided critical winter wages for fishermen, but was dangerous work marked by sealing disasters that claimed hundreds of lives, such as the 1914 Newfoundland Sealing Disaster involving the SS Southern Cross, the SS Newfoundland, and SS Stephano. The rugged hulls and experienced crews of Newfoundland sealing vessels often led sealers such as Bear and Terra Nova to be hired for Arctic exploration and one sealer Algerine was hired to recover Titanic bodies in 1912. Following World War I aircraft were used to find where the herds of seals had gathered on ice sheets. After World War II, the Newfoundland hunt was dominated by large Norwegian sealing vessels until the late 20th century, when the much diminished hunt shifted to smaller motor fishing vessels, based from outports around Newfoundland and Labrador. In 2007, the commercial seal hunt dividend contributed about $6 million to the Newfoundland GDP, a fraction of the industry's former importance.

=== Environmental protection ===
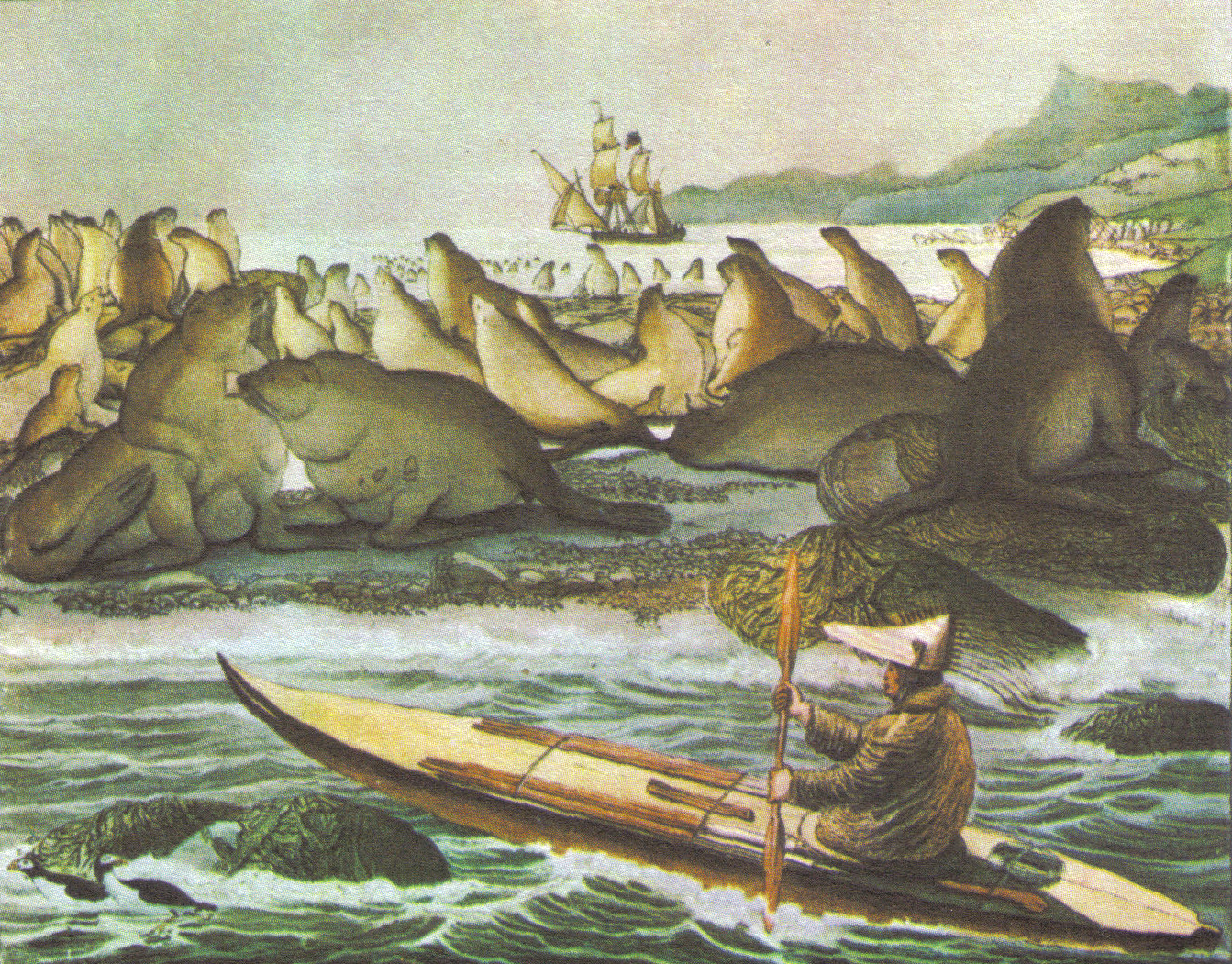
The Russian Rurik, near Saint Paul Island in the Bering Sea. Sealing in the Bering sea led to a diplomatic dispute between the US and Britain in the 1880s, which brought about the first legislative attempts to limit the environmental damage done by the sealers. Drawing by Louis Choris in 1817.

The end of the 19th century was marked by the Bering Sea Controversy between the United States and Great Britain over the management of fur seal harvests. In 1867 the United States government purchased from Russia all her territorial rights in Alaska and the adjacent islands, including the Pribilof Islands, the principal breeding-grounds of the seals in those waters. By Acts of Congress, the killing of seals was strictly regulated on the Pribiloff islands and in "the waters adjacent thereto". Beginning in about 1886, it became the practice of certain British and Canadian vessels to intercept passing seals in the open ocean – over 4.8 kilometres (3 mi) from any shore – and shoot them in the water (pelagic sealing). In the summer of 1886, three British Columbian sealers, the Carolena, the Onward, and Thornton, were captured by an American revenue cutter, the Corwin. The United States claimed exclusive jurisdiction over the sealing industry in the Bering Sea; it also contended that the protection of the fur seal was an international duty, and should be secured by international arrangement. The British imperial government repudiated the claim, but was willing to negotiate on the question of international regulation.

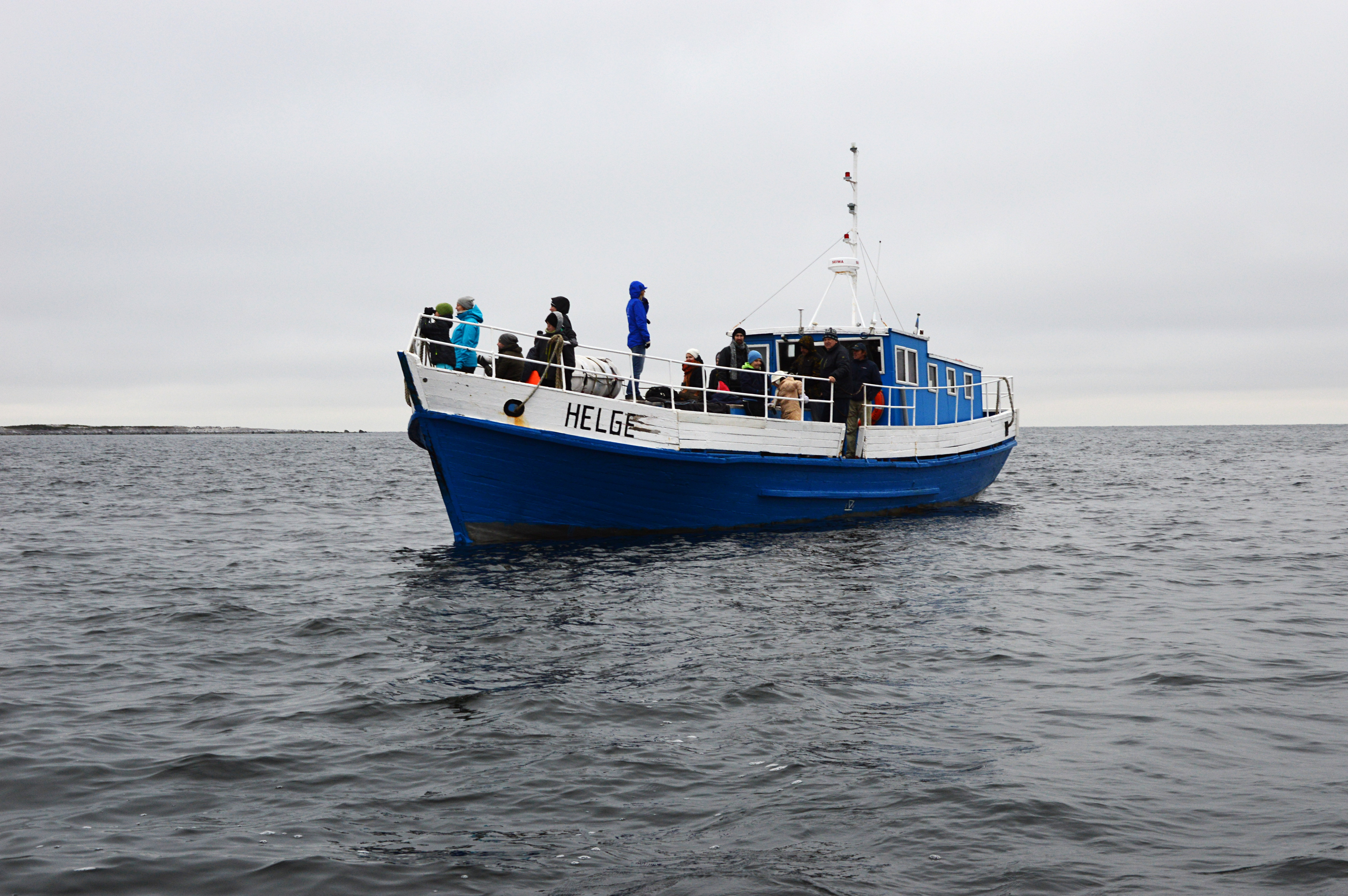
While people living in Estonian coastal areas used to hunt seals, this has changed a lot within the last half century. Within the last decade ecotourism has also emerged, and nowadays seal watching tours are being organized.

The issue was taken to arbitration, which concluded in favour of Britain on all points in 1893. Since the decision was in favour of Great Britain, in accordance with the arbitration treaty the tribunal prescribed a series of regulations for preserving the seal herds which were to be binding upon and enforced by both powers. They limited pelagic sealing as to time, place, and manner by fixing a zone of 97 kilometres (60 mi) around the Pribilof Islands within which the seals were not to be molested at any time, and from 1 May to 31 July each year they were not to be pursued anywhere in the Bering Sea. Only licensed sailing vessels were permitted to engage in fur sealing, and the use of firearms or explosives was prohibited.

This marked the first attempt at establishing regulations on the sealing industry for environmental purposes. However, these regulations failed because the mother seals fed outside the protected area and remained vulnerable. A joint commission of scientists from Britain and the United States further considered the problem, and came to the conclusion that pelagic sealing needed to be curtailed. However, further joint tribunals did not enact new legal restrictions and, at this point, Japan also embarked upon pelagic sealing.

Finally, the North Pacific Fur Seal Convention severely curtailed the sealing industry. Signed on 7 July 1911, by the United States, Great Britain, Japan and Russia, the treaty was designed to manage the commercial harvest of fur-bearing mammals. It outlawed open-water seal hunting and acknowledged the United States' jurisdiction in managing the on-shore hunting of seals for commercial purposes. It was the first international treaty to address wildlife preservation issues.

The treaty was dissolved with the onset of hostilities between the signatories in World War II. However, the treaty set precedent for future national and international laws and treaties, including the Fur Seal Act of 1966 and the Marine Mammal Protection Act of 1972.

Today, commercial sealing is conducted by only five nations: Canada, Greenland, Namibia, Norway, and Russia. The United States, which had been heavily involved in the sealing industry, now maintains a complete ban on the commercial hunting of marine mammals, with the exception of indigenous peoples who are allowed to hunt a small number of seals each year.

== Equipment and methods ==
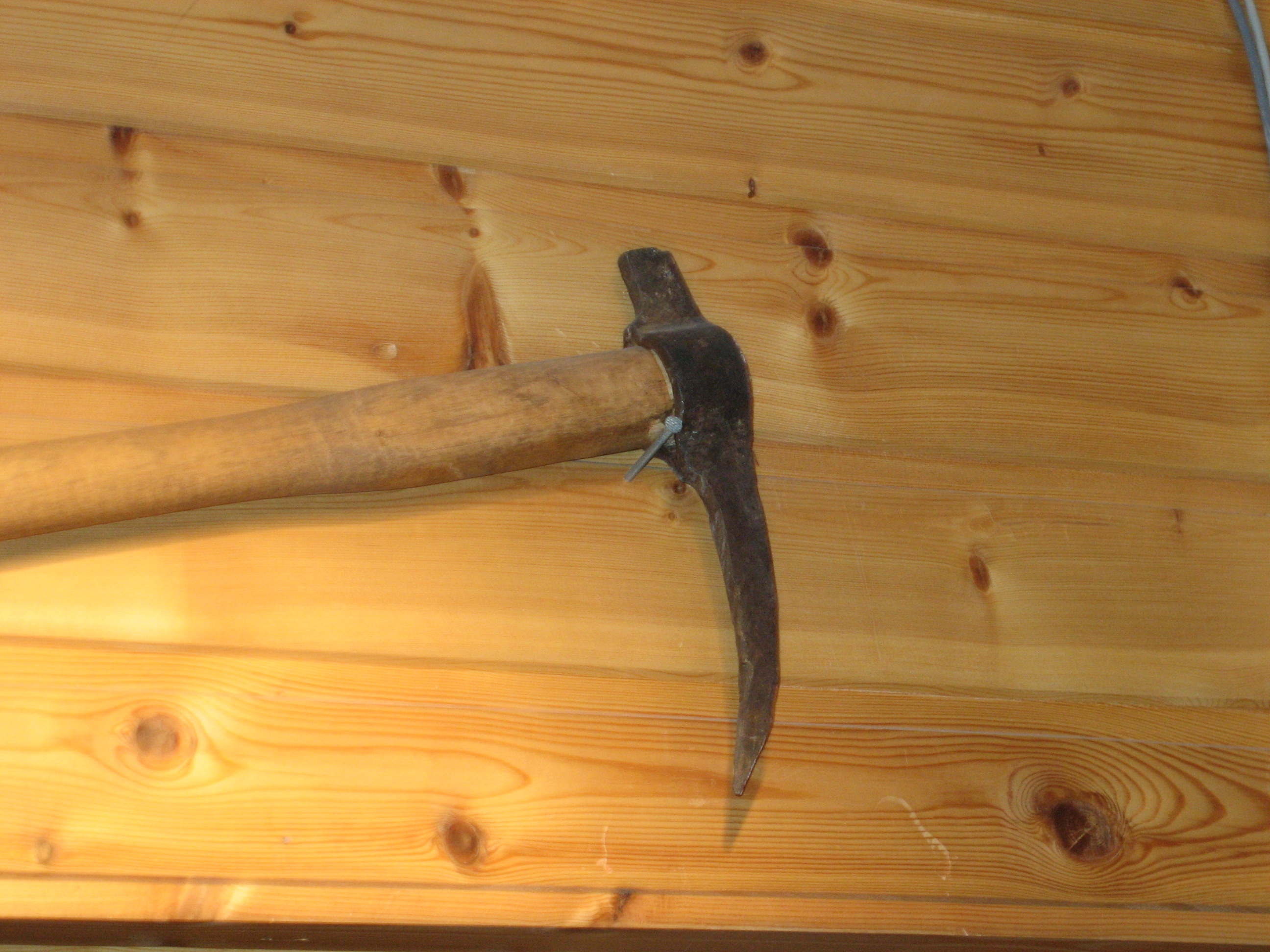
A hakapik

In the Canadian commercial seal hunt, the majority of the hunters initiate the kill using a firearm. Ninety percent of sealers on the ice floes of the Front (east of Newfoundland), where the majority of non-native seal hunting occurs, use firearms.

An older and more traditional method of killing seals is with a hakapik: a heavy wooden club with a hammer head and metal hook on the end. The hakapik is used because of its efficiency; the animal can be killed quickly without damage to its pelt. The hammer head is used to crush the seals' thin skulls, while the hook is used to move the carcasses. Canadian sealing regulations describe the dimensions of the clubs and the hakapiks, and caliber of the rifles and minimum bullet velocity, that can be used. They state: "Every person who strikes a seal with a club or hakapik shall strike the seal on the forehead until its skull has been crushed", and that "No person shall commence to skin or bleed a seal until the seal is dead", which occurs when it "has a glassy-eyed, staring appearance and exhibits no blinking reflex when its eye is touched while it is in a relaxed condition." Reportedly, in one study, three out of eight times, the animal was not rendered either dead or unconscious by shooting, and the hunters would then kill the seal using a hakapik or other club of a type that is sanctioned by the governing authority.

== Modern sealing ==
=== Products made from seals ===
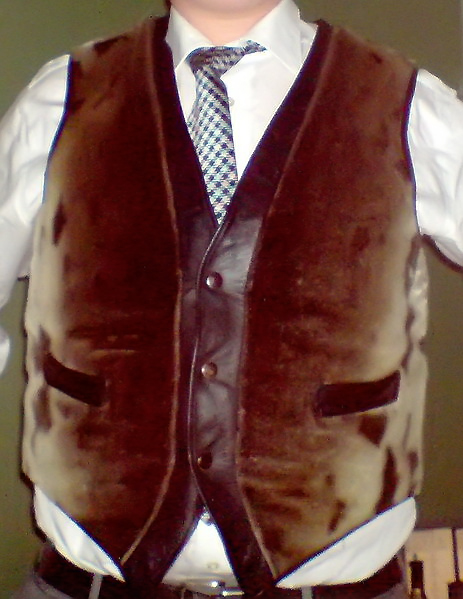
A waistcoat made of seal fur

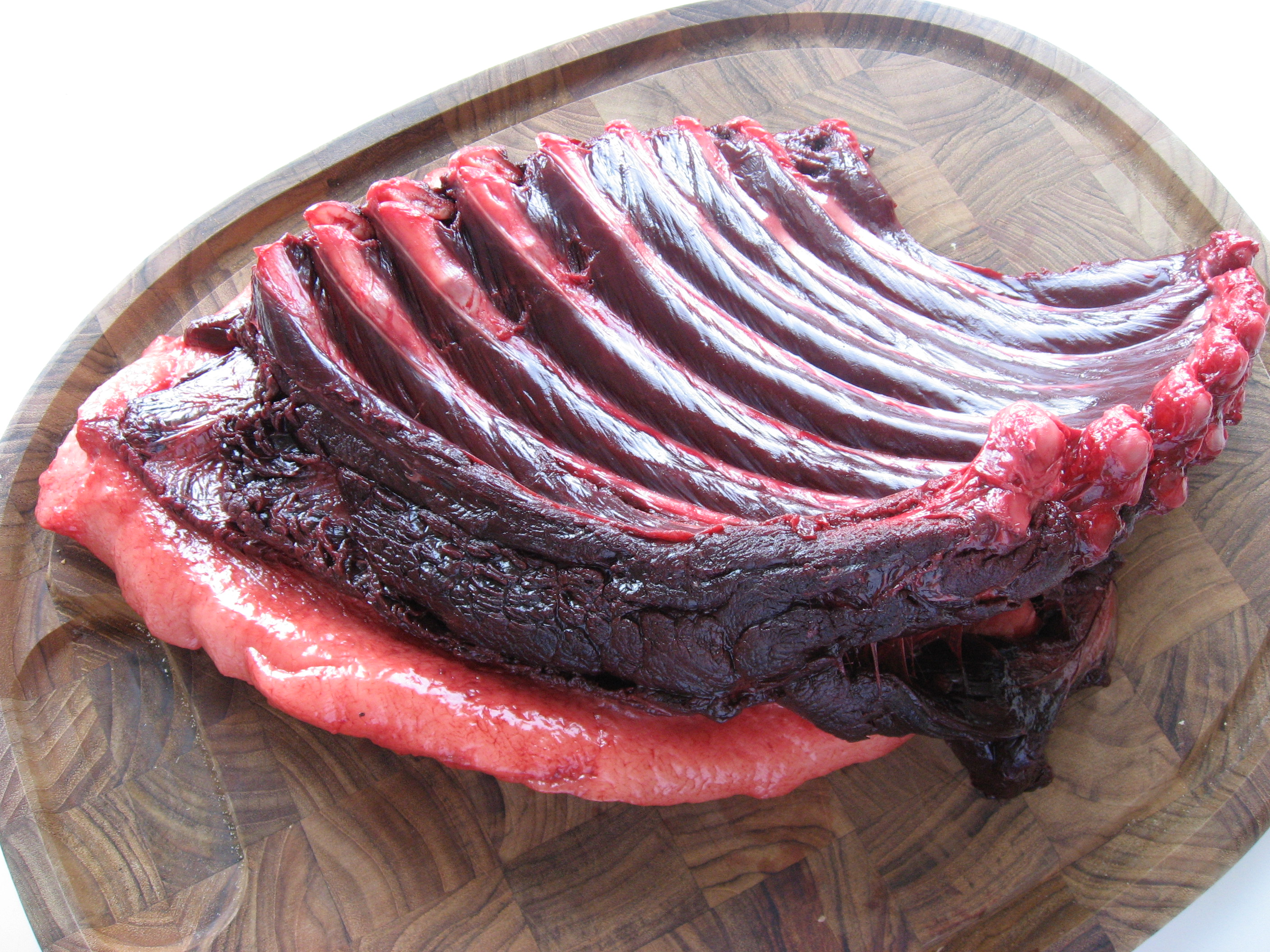
Meat from a young harp seal

Seal skins have been used by aboriginal people for millennia to make waterproof jackets and boots, and seal fur to make fur coats. Pelts account for over half the processed value of a seal, selling at over CA$100 each as of 2006. According to Paul Christian Rieber, of GC Rieber AS, the difficult ice conditions and low quotas in 2006 resulted in reduced access to seal pelts, which caused the commodity price to be pushed up. One high-end fashion designer, Donatella Versace, has begun to use seal pelts.

Seal meat is a source of food for residents of small coastal communities. Meat is sold in the Asian pet food market; in 2004, only Taiwan and South Korea purchased seal meat from Canada. Seal blubber is used to make seal oil, marketed as a fish oil supplement. In 2001, 2% of Canada's raw seal oil was processed and sold in Canadian health stores. There has been virtually no market for seal organs since 1998.

=== Sealing states ===
In 2005, three companies exported seal skin: Rieber in Norway, Atlantic Marine in Canada and Great Greenland in Greenland. Their clients were earlier French fashion houses and fur makers in Europe, but today the fur is mainly exported to Russia and China.

==== Canada ====
In Canada, the harp seal and the hooded seal are the main target species of the commercial hunt. The commercial seal hunt differs from the year-round, Inuit seal hunt done in the northern regions of Canada. The commercial hunt takes place in the Gulf of Saint Lawrence, and the floes of pack ice on Newfoundland's north coast called "The Front".

Sealing is regulated by Fisheries and Oceans Canada. Commercial sealers need to be licensed and comply with the Marine Mammal Regulations on when they can hunt seals and the methods they use. The commercial hunt is monitored at all times by fishery officers who report any violations of sealing regulations. Sealers are expected to use a three step method when killing seals. Firstly, striking the seal on the top of the head with either a firearm, hakapik, or club. Secondly, checking to ensure the skull is properly crushed. Thirdly, cutting the arteries beneath the front flippers to ensure the seal bleeds out before being skinned. The hunting of whitecoats (harp seal pups) has been illegal since 1987.

FOC estimates the harp seal population to be around 4.7 million. Although hunters are allowed to hunt up to 400,000 harp seals per hunting season, because of falling demand and international bans on seal products, hunters take much less.

For Inuit in Canada, seal hunting has great cultural, historical, and economic importance. Even though most sealing regulations and campaigns target the commercial hunt, Inuit seal hunters and their communities have also suffered economic damages resulting from international bans on seal products and negative publicity surrounding sealing.

While the populations of seal species of the hunt are not at risk, climate change poses a challenge to seal hunting in Canada. As the winters in Newfoundland and Labrador grow warmer, it becomes more difficult for seal pups to mature to be hunted. This has resulted in times when hunters postpone their hunts or cut their hunts short in response to the low populations of mature seals in certain regions.

===== Export =====
Canada's biggest market for seal pelts is Norway. Carino Limited is one of Newfoundland's largest seal pelt producers. Carino (CAnada–RIeber–NOrway) is marketing its seal pelts mainly through its parent company, GC Rieber Skinn, Bergen, Norway. Canada sold pelts to eleven countries in 2004. The next largest were Germany, Greenland, and China/Hong Kong. Other importers were Finland, Denmark, France, Greece, South Korea, and Russia. Asia remains the principal market for seal meat exports. One of Canada's market access priorities for 2002 was to "continue to press Korean authorities to obtain the necessary approvals for the sale of seal meat for human consumption in Korea." Canadian and Korean officials agreed in 2003 on specific Korean import requirements for seal meat. For 2004, only Taiwan and South Korea purchased seal meat from Canada.

Canadian seal product exports reached CA$18 million in 2006. Of this, CA$5.4 million went to the EU. In 2009, the European Union banned all seal imports, shrinking the market. Where pelts once sold for more than $100, they now fetch $8 to $15 each.

==== Greenland ====
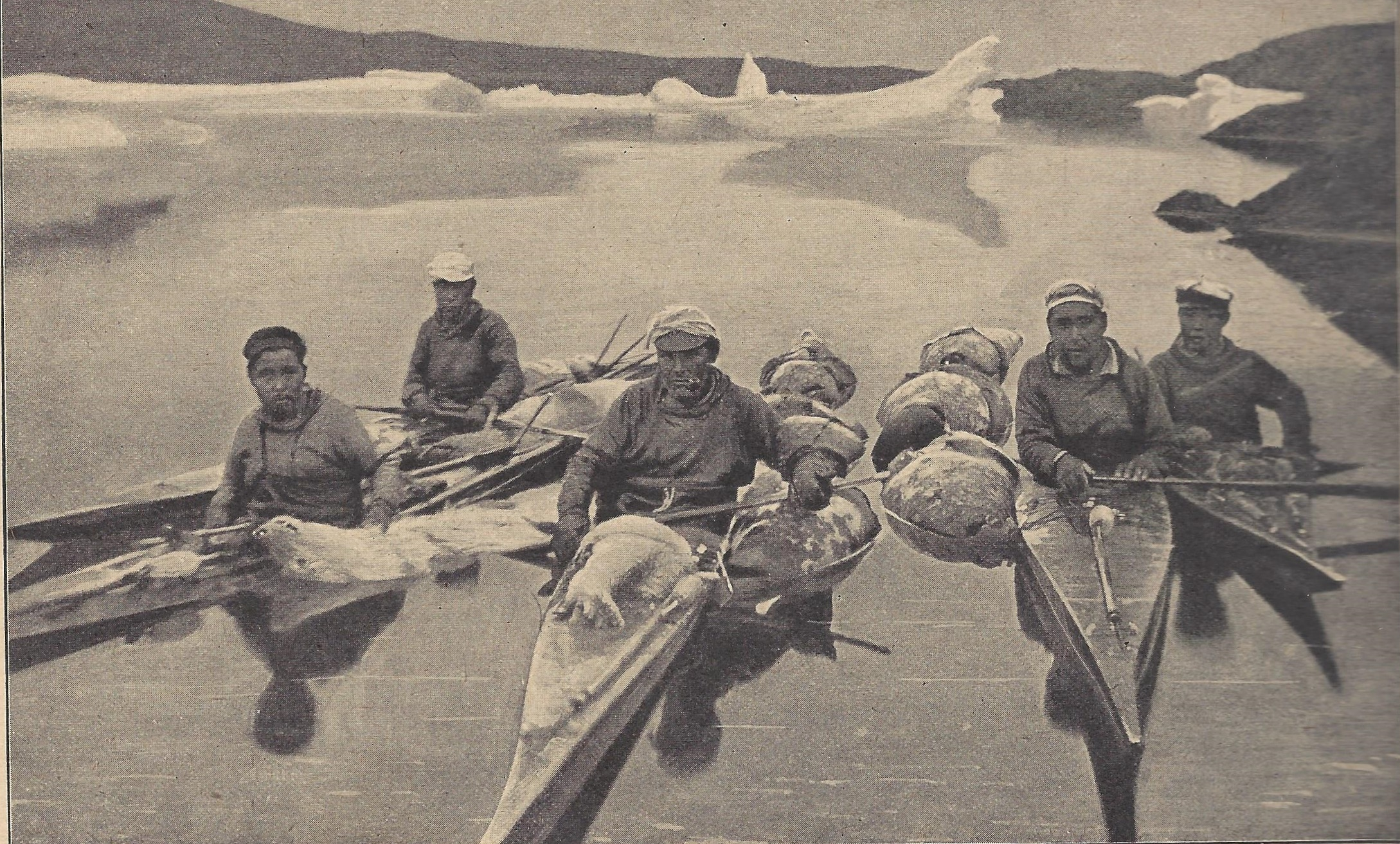
Greenlandic Inuit hunters with several seals, c. 1900. Historically seal hunting was often done from kayak with a harpoon, but today most is done from small motorboat with rifle/shotgun

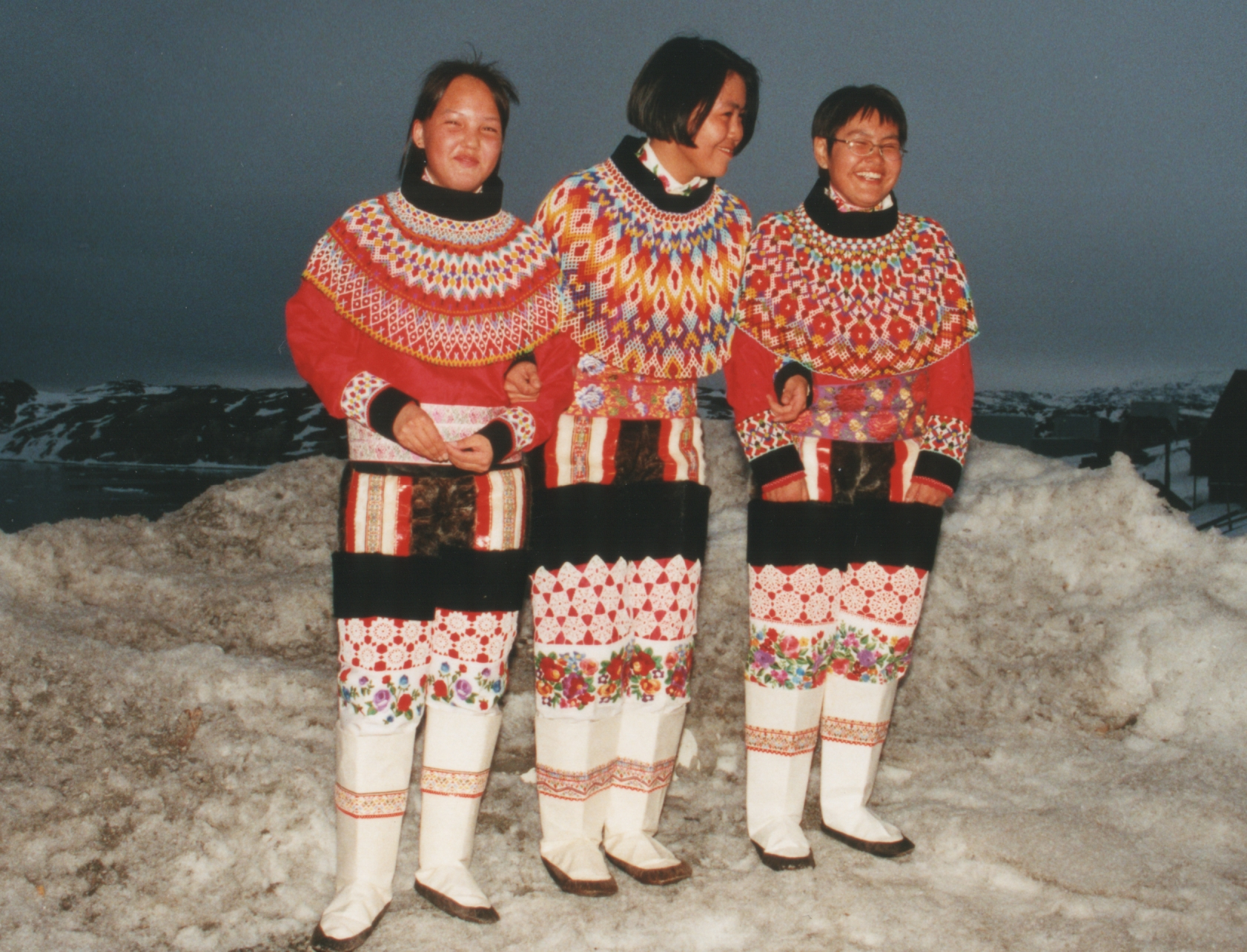
Three women wearing Greenland's National Costume, which contain seal skin

Seals are abundant in Greenland with an estimated total population of 12 million, and about 82,000 harp seals, 78,000 ringed seals and a much lower number of hooded seals are killed each year (historically, a couple of other seal species were also hunted). The hunter has to have a hunting license and is obliged to register all kills with the authorities. Young seals and mothers with young are fully protected.

Hunting is done with a rifle or shotgun, which by law has to be at least a .22 caliber or a 20-gauge, respectively. The most common and widespread method involves using a small boat to slowly approach a seal sitting on ice or swimming at the surface of the water, and shoot it from a distance, aiming for the head. Once shot and killed, the boat rushes up to the seal and hooks the carcass out of the water before it sinks. Another method is sometimes used in places where the sea is almost entirely covered by ice. The hunter slowly crawls forwards on the ice towards a seal, hiding behind a white screen. Once within shooting range, the seal is shot. Although the killed seal can be retrieved with the use of a snowmobile, it is illegal to use a motor vehicle (including snowmobile), plane or helicopter in the hunt itself.

Seal hunting is very important to the local societies, especially small rural villages. In 2011, there were almost 8,000 hunters, including 2,100 full-time (the remaining are often fishers–hunters), out of a total work force of 32,000 people in Greenland. The meat is usually consumed locally and the skin is also used for local clothes (for example, Greenland's National Costume contains seal skin, including in the kamiks) or sold abroad. However, exports were hard hit by international campaigns against seal pelts, starting in 1980s (to some degree also later) and often focussing on seals being killed by clubbing or similar methods (especially young, but also adults), methods that were and are not in use in Greenland. As a consequence, Greenland attempted to distance itself from places where such methods were in use. For example, Greenland banned imports of seal skin from Canada for a period in 2006, specifically citing the way seals were killed. The European Union ban on seal skins has an exemption for those that originate from subsistence hunts by Inuit or other indigenous communities and using methods where animal welfare is considered (i.e., killed using humane methods), which has allowed Greenland to continue the trade. Nevertheless, the number of skins treated for commercial sale (both local and international) has fallen considerably in recent years and by 2017 was below 25,000.

==== Namibia ====
Year	Annual Quota	Catch
Before 1990	17,000 pups	
1998–2000	30,000 pups	
2001–2003	60,000 pups	
2004–2006	60,000 pups, 7,000 bulls	
2007	80,000 pups, 6,000 bulls	
2008	80,000 pups, 6,000 bulls	23,000 seals
2009	85,000 pups, 7,000 bulls	
2010	85,000 pups, 7,000 bulls	

Namibia is the only country in the Southern Hemisphere culling seals. Although the protection and the sustainable use of natural resources is part of Namibia's constitution, it claims to conduct the second largest seal hunt in the world, mainly because of the huge amount of fish seals are estimated to consume. While a government-initiated study found seal colonies consume more fish than the entire fishing industry can catch, animal protection society Seal Alert South Africa estimated less than 0.3% losses to commercial fisheries.

Hunting is done from July to November on two places, Cape Cross and Atlas Bay, and in the past at Wolf Bay. These two colonies together account for 75% of the Cape fur seal population of the country.

Cape Cross is a tourism resort and the largest Cape fur seal colony in Namibia. The Department of Tourism has stated that "Cape Cross Seal Reserve was established to protect the largest breeding colony of Cape fur seals in the world". In season, the resort is closed and sealed off during the culling in the early morning hours, journalists are not allowed to enter. Namibia's SPCA is allowed to observe the culling from 2010 onwards.

Namibia's Ministry of Fisheries announced a three-year rolling quota for the seal harvest, although different quotas per year are sometimes reported. The latest quota announced was in 2009, valid until 2011. The quotas are usually not filled by the concession holders.

In 2009, an unusual bid to end seal culling in Namibia was attempted when Seal Alert tried to raise money to purchase the only buyer of Namibian seals, Australian-based Hatem Yavuz, in its entirety for US$14.2 million. The project did not materialise. Also, the Government of Namibia offered the International Fund for Animal Welfare (IFAW) an opportunity to buy out the two sealers in Namibia to finally end the culling. The offer was rejected.

In 2011, South African activists launched a boycott of Namibian tourism and Namibian products in response to the cull.

==== Norway ====
Year	Quota	Catch
1950		255,056
1955		295,172
1960		216,034
1965		140,118
1970		188,980
1975		112,274
1980		60,746
1985		19,902
1990		15,232
1992		14,076
1993		12,772
1994		18,113
1995		15,981
1996		16,737
1997		10,114
1998		9,067
1999		6,399
2000		20,549
2001		
2002		10,691
2003		12,870
2004	30,600	14,746
2005	30,600	21,597
2006	45,200	17,037
2007	46,200	8,000
2008	31,000	1,260
2011	49,400	7,673

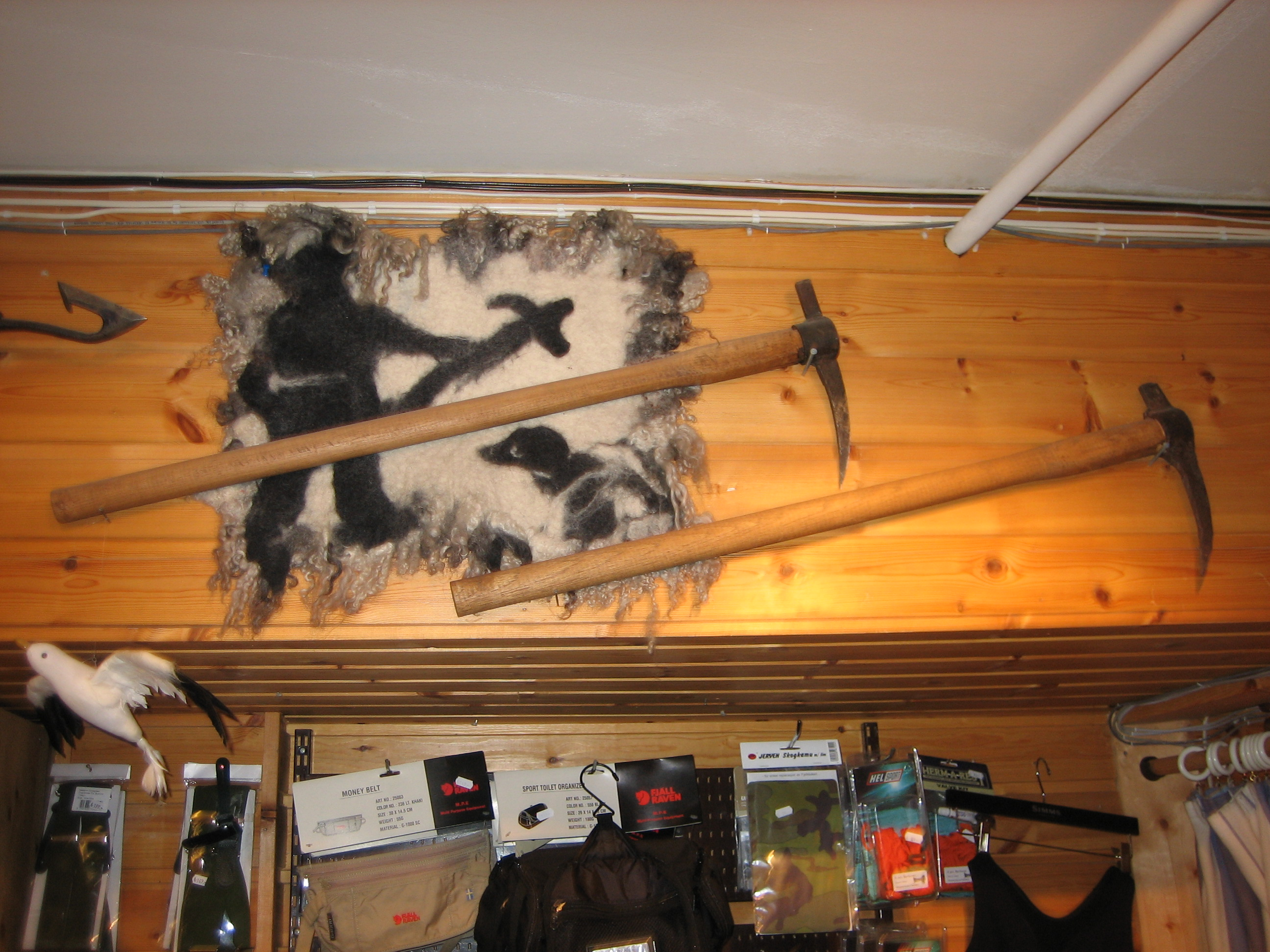
Hakapiks displayed on the wall of a gun shop in Tromsø, Norway

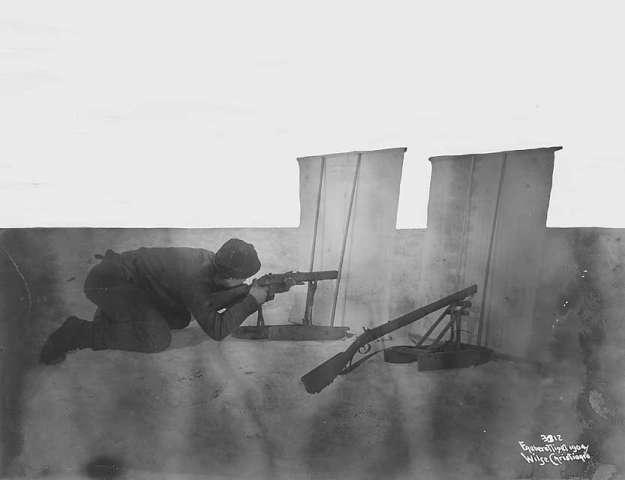
Seal hunting on ice in 1904

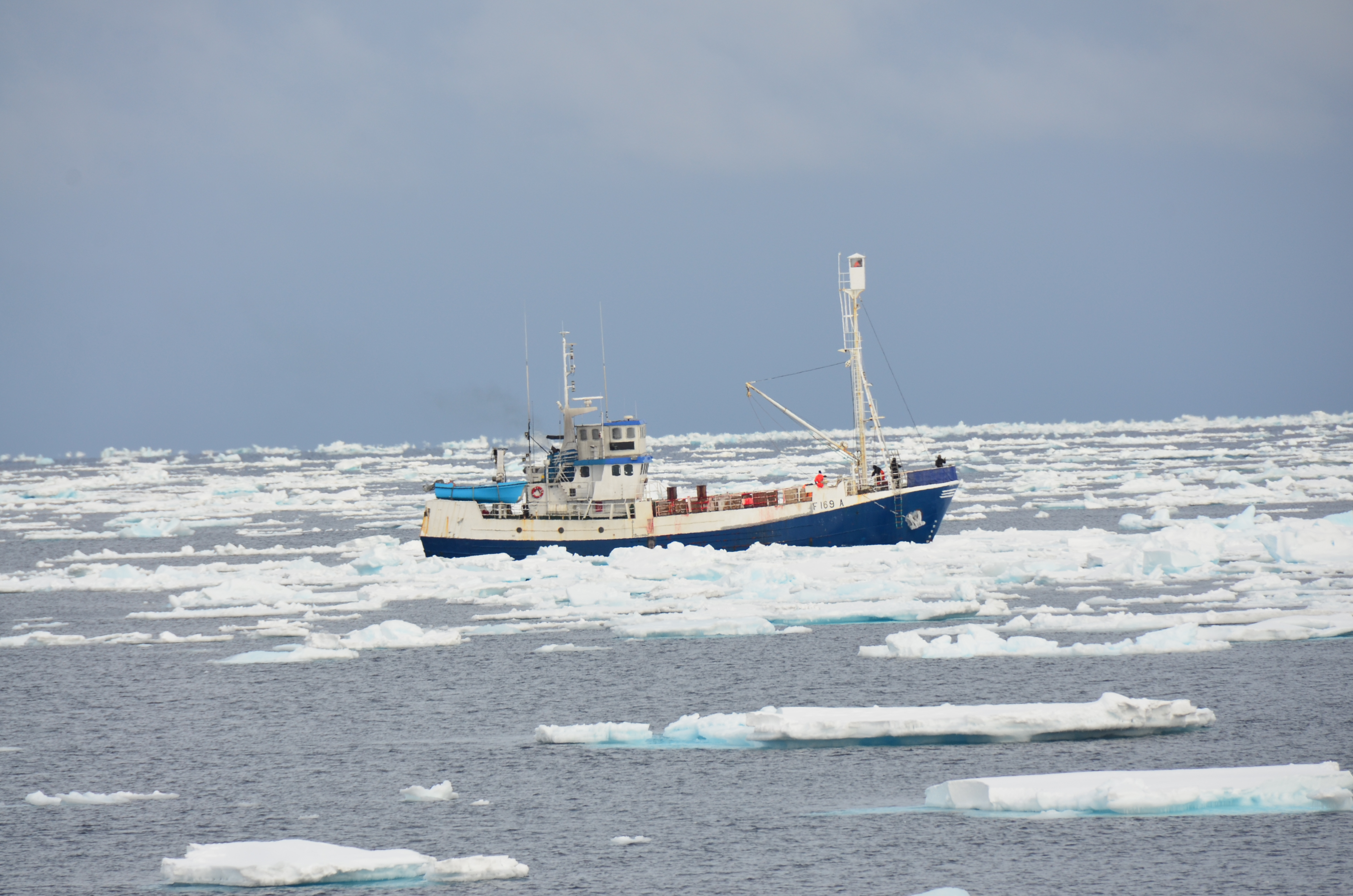
The Norwegian sealing vessel Havsel in the West Ice in 2017

The Norwegian sealing season runs from January to September. The hunt involves "seal catching" by seagoing sealing boats on the Arctic ice shelf, and "seal hunting" on the coast and islands of mainland Norway. The latter is carried out by small groups of licensed hunters shooting seals from land and using small boats to retrieve the catch.

In 2005, Norway allowed foreign nationals to take part in the hunt. In 2006, 17,037 seals (including 13,390 harp and 3,647 hooded seals) were killed. In 2007, the Norwegian Ministry of Fisheries and Coastal Affairs stated up to 13.5 million kr (about US$2.6 million) would be given in funding to vessels in the 2007 Norwegian seal hunt.

===== Regulations =====
All Norwegian sealing vessels are required to carry a qualified veterinary inspector on board. Norwegian sealers are required to pass a shooting test each year before the season starts, using the same weapon and ammunition as they would on the ice. Likewise, they have to pass a hakapik test.

Adult seals more than one year old must be shot in the head with expanding bullets, and cannot be clubbed to death. The hakapik shall be used to ensure the animal is dead. This is done by crushing the skull of the shot adult seal with the short end of the hakapik, before the long spike is thrust deep into the animal's brain. The seal is then bled by making an incision from its jaw to the end of its sternum. The killing and bleeding must be done on the ice, and live animals may never be brought on board the ship. Young seals may be killed using just the hakapik, but only in the aforementioned manner, i.e., they need not be shot.

Seals in the water and seals with young may not be killed, and the use of traps, artificial lighting, airplanes, or helicopters is forbidden.

The hakapik may only be used by certified seal-catchers (fangstmenn) operating in the pack ice of the Arctic Ocean and not by coastal seal hunters. All coastal seal hunters must be pre-approved by the Norwegian Directorate of Fisheries and have to pass a large game hunting test.

In 2007, the European Food Safety Agency confirmed the animals are put to death faster and more humanely in the Norwegian sealing than in large game hunting on land.

===== Export =====
In Norway in 2004, only Rieber worked with sealskin and seal oil. In 2001, the biggest producer of raw seal oil was Canada (two percent of the raw oil was processed and sold in Canadian health stores). Rieber had the majority of all distribution of raw seal oil in the world market, but there was no demand for seal oil. From 1995 to 2005, Rieber annually received between 2 and 3 million kr in subsidy. A 2003–2004 parliamentary report says CG Rieber Skinn is the only company in the world that delivers skin from bluebacks. Most of the skins processed by Rieber have been imported from abroad, mainly from Canada. Only a small portion is from the Norwegian hunt. Of the processed skin, five percent is sold in Norway; the rest is exported to the Russian and Asian markets.

Fortuna Oils AS (established in 2004) is a 100% owned subsidiary of GC Rieber. They get the majority of their raw oil imported from Newfoundland. They also have access to raw oil from the Norwegian hunt.

==== Russia ====
The Russian seal hunt has not been well monitored since the breakup of the Soviet Union. The quota in 1998 was 35,000 animals. Reportedly, many whitecoat pups are not properly killed and are transported, while injured, to processing areas. In January 2000, a bill to ban seal hunting was passed by the Russian parliament by 273 votes to 1, but was vetoed by President Vladimir Putin.

On 21 September 2007 in Arkhangelsk, the Norwegian GC Rieber Skinn AS proposed a joint Russian–Norwegian seal hunting project. The campaign was carried out from one hunt boat supplied by GS Rieber Skinn AS in 2007, lasted two weeks, and brought in 40,000 ₽ per Russian hunter. GS Rieber skinn AS declared a plan to order 20 boats and donate them to the Pomor. CG Rieber Skinn AS, in 2007, established a daughter company in Arkhangelsk, called GC Rieber Skinn Pomor'e Lic. (GC Rieber Skinn Pomorje).

The Norwegian company Polardrift AS, in 2007, had plans to establish a company in Russia, and operate under Russian flag, in close cooperation with GC Rieber Skinn Pomor'e.

Plans for the 2008 season included both helicopter-based hunts, mainly to take whitecoats, and boat-based hunts, mainly targeting beaters.

On 18 March 2009, Russia's Minister of Natural Resources and Ecology, Yuriy Trutnev, announced a complete ban on the hunting of harp seals younger than one year of age in the White Sea.

== Sealing debate ==
Canada has become the center of the sealing debate because of the comparatively large size of its hunt.

=== Cruelty to animals ===
According to a 2002 peer-reviewed study done by five Canadian veterinarians and funded by the Canadian Veterinary Medical Association (CVMA), "the large majority of seals taken during this hunt (at best, 98% in work reported here) are killed in an acceptably humane manner." These veterinarians found, "During the 2001 season in the Gulf, three (1.9%) of 158 seals brought on board of the sealing vessels and directly observed by Daoust had not been killed, and in one (0.86%) of 116 interactions between seals and sealers observed on videotapes by Daoust and Crook, the seal also did not appear to have been killed before being hooked and brought on board." They thus concluded, "This small proportion of animals that are not killed efficiently justifies continued attention to this industry's activities, preferably by members of the veterinary profession, who are best equipped to assess the humaneness of the killing methods."

In observing four videos taken during the 2001 seal hunt in the Gulf of St. Lawrence, the authors of this report state, "A large proportion (87%) of the sealers recorded on the four videotapes failed to palpate the skull or check the corneal reflex before proceeding to hook or bleed the seal or go to another seal."

The Royal Commission on Seals and the Sealing Industry in Canada, also known as the Malouf Commission, concluded in a 1986 report, "Judged by the criteria of rapidity of unconsciousness and particularly the absence of preslaughter stress, the clubbing of seal pups is, when properly performed, at least as humane as, and often more humane than, the killing methods used in commercial slaughterhouses, which are accepted by a majority of the public."

According to the (DFO), "The Marine Mammal Regulations stipulate that seals must be harvested quickly using only high-powered rifles, shotguns firing slugs, clubs or hakapiks."

However, the International Fund for Animal Welfare conducted a study that disputed these findings. This report concludes the Canadian commercial seal hunt results in considerable and unacceptable suffering.

The veterinarians examined 76 seal carcasses and found that in 17% of the cases, there were no detectable lesions of the skull, leading them to conclude the clubbing likely did not result in loss of consciousness. In 25% of the remaining cases, the carcasses had minimal to moderate skull fractures, indicative of a "decreased level of consciousness", but probably not unconsciousness. The remaining 58% of the carcasses examined showed extensive skull fractures.

This veterinary study included examination of video footage of 179 seals hunted in 1998, 1999, and 2000. In these videos, 96 seals were shot, 56 were shot and then clubbed or gaffed, 19 were clubbed or gaffed, and 8 were killed by unknown means. In 79% of these cases, sealers did not check the corneal reflex to ensure that the seals were dead prior to hooking or skinning them. In only 6% of these cases, seals were bled immediately, where struck. The average time from initial strike to bleeding was 66 seconds.

In 2005, IFAW published a comparison of the CVMA-funded study and its own study. In this critique, David M. Lavigne, Science Advisor to IFAW, writes, "The Burdon et al. evidence cited above addresses the question of whether seals were likely conscious or unconscious at the time they were skinned, using post-mortem examination of skulls. In marked contrast, the figure cited from Daoust et al.'s report represents the number of seals clubbed or shot that were brought on board sealing vessels while still conscious. That number ignores any and all animal suffering that occurs between the time animals are clubbed or shot until they eventually reach a sealing vessel, usually on the end of a hook or gaff." Another difference between these reports is "Daoust et al.'s direct observations were made under very different conditions than those provided by Burdon et al. Unlike Burdon et al.'s observations, they were made directly from sealing vessels so that the sealers were unavoidably aware that observers were present. As Daoust et al. (p 692) admit, the presence of an observer on a sealing vessel "may have incited sealers to hit the seals skulls more vigorously". Of course, the presence of an observer also has the potential to modify other sealing practices, including checking for a corneal reflex and bleeding animals immediately after clubbing."

In 2005, the World Wildlife Fund (WWF) commissioned the Independent Veterinarians Working Group Report. With reference to video evidence, the report states: "Perception of the seal hunt seems to be based largely on emotion, and on visual images that are often difficult even for experienced observers to interpret with certainty. While a hakapik strike on the skull of a seal appears brutal, it is humane if it achieves rapid, irreversible loss of consciousness leading to death."

=== Ecological feasibility ===
In 2013, the Canadian Department of Fisheries and Oceans conducted a population survey. The resulting estimate of the harp seal population was 7.3 million animals, over three times what it was in the 1970s. In 2004, the population estimate was similar: 5.9 million (95% CI 4.6 million to 7.2 million).

Prior to the arrival of European settlers, a much larger population of harp seals migrated to the waters off Newfoundland and Labrador. Settlers began exploiting the population, with kills peaking in the middle of the 1800s. In the first half of the 1840s, 546,000 seals were killed annually. This led to a population decline that adversely affected the industry.

In the 1950s and 1960s an average of over 291,000 seal pups were killed each year. This led to a population decline to less than 2 million seals. Conservationists became alarmed and demanded controls on kill rates. Thus in 1971, Canada instituted a quota system. In the years from 1971 to 1982, an average of 165,627 seals were killed.

In 1983, the European Union banned the import of whitecoat harp seal pup pelts (pelts from pups less than about two weeks of age, when the pups molt). As a result, the market for pelts dropped. The kill rates thus declined in subsequent years to an average of about 52,000 seals from 1983 to 1995. During this time, the harp seal population increased.

After the European Union's ban on whitecoat pelt imports, the Canadian government and sealing industry developed markets for the pelts of beaters. In 1996, the kill rates again increased to over 200,000 each year, except in the year 2000. In 2002 and 2004 to 2006, over 300,000 seal pups were killed each year.

As a result of population concerns, Norway's seal hunt is now controlled by quotas based on recommendations from International Council for the Exploration of the Sea (ICES), However, sealing in Norway has declined in recent years, and the quotas have not been reached.

In addition to hunting pressures on the population of harp seals, as ice seals that are dependent on solid sea ice for whelping, the harp seal population is affected by global climate change. The lack of sea ice in recent years has resulted in the drowning deaths of tens of thousands of newborn harp seal pups.

=== Objections to fur ===
Animal welfare advocates and organizations, such as PETA, object to the use of real fur when many synthetic "faux fur" alternatives are available.

=== Economic impact ===
According to Canadian authorities, the value of the 2004 seal harvest was CA$16.5 million, which significantly contributes to seal manufacturing companies, and for several thousand fishermen and First Nations peoples. For some sealers, they claim, proceeds from the hunt make up a third of their annual income. Critics, however, say this represents only a tiny fraction of the CA$600-million Newfoundland fishing industry. Sealing opponents also say $16.5 million is insignificant, compared to the funding required to regulate and subsidize the hunt. For 1995 and 1996, there are confirmed reports Fisheries and Oceans Canada encouraged maximum utilization of harvested seals through a $0.20 per pound meat subsidy. The level of subsidy totaled $650,000 in 1997, $440,000 in 1998 and $250,000 in 1999. There were no meat subsidies in 2000. Some critics, such as the McCartneys (see below), have suggested promoting that area as an ecotourism site would be far more lucrative than the annual harvest.

=== As a culling method ===
In March 2005, Greenpeace asked the DFO to "dispel the myth that seals are hampering the recovery of cod stocks." In doing so, they implied the seal hunt is, at least in part, a cull designed to increase cod stocks. Cod fishing has traditionally been a key part of the Atlantic fishery, and an important part of the economy of Newfoundland and Labrador. Fisheries and Oceans Canada responded there is no connection between the annual seal harvest and the cod fishery, and that the seal hunt is "established on sound conservation principles."

=== Public opinion ===
Internationally, opposition to the seal hunt is comparable to abhorrence about the treatment of animals in other cultural-economic practices such as bull fighting, fox hunts and whaling. Within Canada, public opinion is relative to Canadians' geographic proximity to communities with a historical tradition of participating in the seal hunt, and opposition is higher in urban centres outside of Newfoundland and Labrador.

=== Protests ===
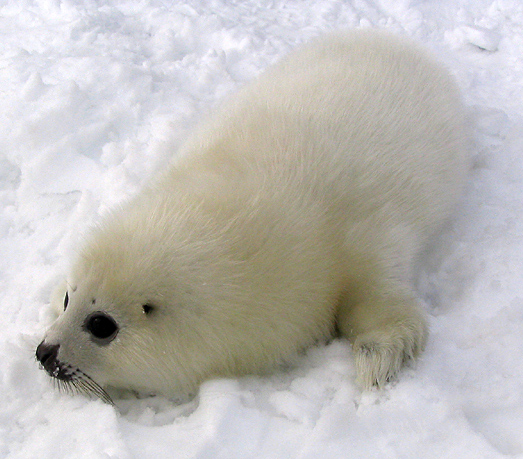
Harp seal pup

Many animal protection groups encourage people to petition against the harvest. Respect for Animals and Humane Society International believe the hunt will be ended only by the financial pressure of a boycott of Canadian seafood. In 2005, the Humane Society of the United States (HSUS) called for such a boycott in the United States.

Protesters frequently use images of whitecoats, despite Canada's ban on the commercial hunting of suckling pups. The HSUS explains this by saying images of the legally hunted ragged jackets are nearly indistinguishable from those of whitecoats. Also, they state, according to official DFO kill reports, 97% percent of the estimated million harp seals killed in the last four years have been under three months old, and the majority of these are less than one month old.

On 26 March 2006, seven anti-sealing activists were arrested in the Gulf of St. Lawrence for violating the terms of their observer permits. By law, observers must maintain a ten-meter distance between themselves and the sealers. Five of the protesters were later acquitted. In the same month, as part of a counterprotest, Newfoundland and Labrador Premier Danny Williams encouraged people in the province to boycott Costco after the retailer decided to stop carrying seal oil capsules. Costco stated politics played no role in their decision to remove the capsules, and on 4 April that year, they were again being sold in Costco stores.

In 2009, the European Union passed a law banning the promotion of imported seal products. The law was approved by the Council of the European Union without debate on 27 July 2009. Denmark, Romania, and Austria abstained. The Canadian government responded to the move by stating that it will take the European Union to the World Trade Organization if the ban does not exempt Canada. Canadian Inuit from the territory of Nunavut have opposed the ban and lobbied European Parliament members against it. Canadian seal hunting issues had been spotlighted in the months leading up to the 2010 Winter Olympics which were held in Vancouver.

==== Inuit impact ====
An important distinction between the southern Canadian seal hunt and the Inuit Canadian hunt is that Canadian Inuit typically hunt ringed seals, while the southern Canadian hunt targets the pelt of the harp seal. Greenlandic Inuit hunt and eat both ringed and harp seals. Protests surrounding the southern seal hunt in Canada have historically impacted Canadian and Greenlandic Inuit. Because of the impact of protest, profits surrounding the Inuit hunting of ringed seal fall with any ban on any type of seal product, regardless of exemption. For example, in 1963, prices for high-quality pelts of ringed seals could reach above $20.00 each; these same pelts in 1967, the year of the first major protests, would only sell for $2.50 each, which impacted Inuit in many areas. Protests in other years have resulted in similar decreases in price.

==== Celebrity involvement ====
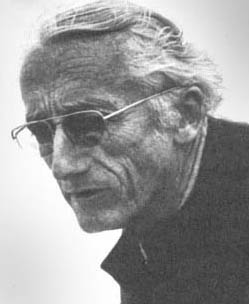
Marine ecologist Jacques Cousteau criticized the seal hunt protest as emotional.

Numerous celebrities have opposed the commercial seal hunt. Rex Murphy reported celebrities have aided anti-hunt activists since the mid-20th century; Yvette Mimieux and Loretta Swit were recruited to attract the attention of international gossip magazines. Other celebrities who have aligned themselves against the hunt include Richard Dean Anderson, Kim Basinger, Juliette Binoche, Paul McCartney, Heather Mills, Pamela Anderson, Martin Sheen, Pierce Brosnan, Morrissey, Paris Hilton, Robert Kennedy, Jr., Rutger Hauer, Brigitte Bardot, Ed Begley, Jr., Farley Mowat, Linda Blair, the Red Hot Chili Peppers, and Jackie Evancho.

In March 2006, Brigitte Bardot traveled to Ottawa to protest the hunt, though the prime minister turned down her request for a meeting. During the same month, Paul and Heather Mills McCartney toured the Gulf of Saint Lawrence's sealing grounds, and spoke out against the seal hunt, including as guests on Larry King Live, where the two debated with Danny Williams, the Premier of Newfoundland and Labrador.

In 1978, marine ecologist Jacques Cousteau criticized the seal hunt protest: "The harp seal question is entirely emotional. We have to be logical. We have to aim our activity first to the endangered species. Those who are moved by the plight of the harp seal could also be moved by the plight of the pig – the way they are slaughtered is horrible."

== Media ==
- Alethea Arnaquq-Baril's documentary Angry Inuk details the relationship between seal hunting, Inuit poverty, and the consequences of international trade bans.
- Rudyard Kipling's The White Seal, part of The Jungle Book, describes seal hunting from the seals' point of view, with the central character being a white seal seeking for his seals a safe haven from hunters.
- Jack London's novel The Sea Wolf takes place aboard "the schooner Ghost, bound seal-hunting for Japan" circa 1893.
- Robert Cushman Murphy's book of letters Logbook for Grace describes the expedition of the sealer Daisy in 1912 to South Georgia Island, and includes many details about the brutal elephant seal fishery there.
- Seal clubbers are a class that player characters can choose in the browser-based RPG Kingdom of Loathing.
- The "topi" enemy in the NES game Ice Climber is a seal in the Japanese version; however, it was changed into a yeti-like creature in North American and European versions because of concerns over seal hunting references (since the main characters in the game use hammers to defeat enemies).
- The television miniseries The North Water depicts seal hunting.

== See also ==
- Bladder Festival
- Kayak angst
- The Viking (1931 film)

== Sources ==
- Entwisle, Peter (1998). Behold the Moon: The European Occupation of the Dunedin District 1770–1848. Dunedin, NZ: Port Daniel Press. pp. 10–11, 13–15. ISBN 978-0473055912.
