= Ragged-jacket =

A ragged-jacket (or, occasionally, "raggedy-jacket") is the name given to a harp or grey seal pup when it is undergoing its first moult, and the intermediate stage between a "whitecoat" and a "beater". The moulting begins when the pup is at an age of about 12–14 days, at which time they cease nursing. At this young age, the pups are not yet capable of swimming. The pup stays on the ice for about two weeks before the fur has moulted. It does not feed during this time and therefore loses weight. When the white fur has been completely shed at around four weeks of age, the seal is called a "beater."

== See also ==
- Sealing
