= GC Rieber =

Norwegian company

GC Rieber AS
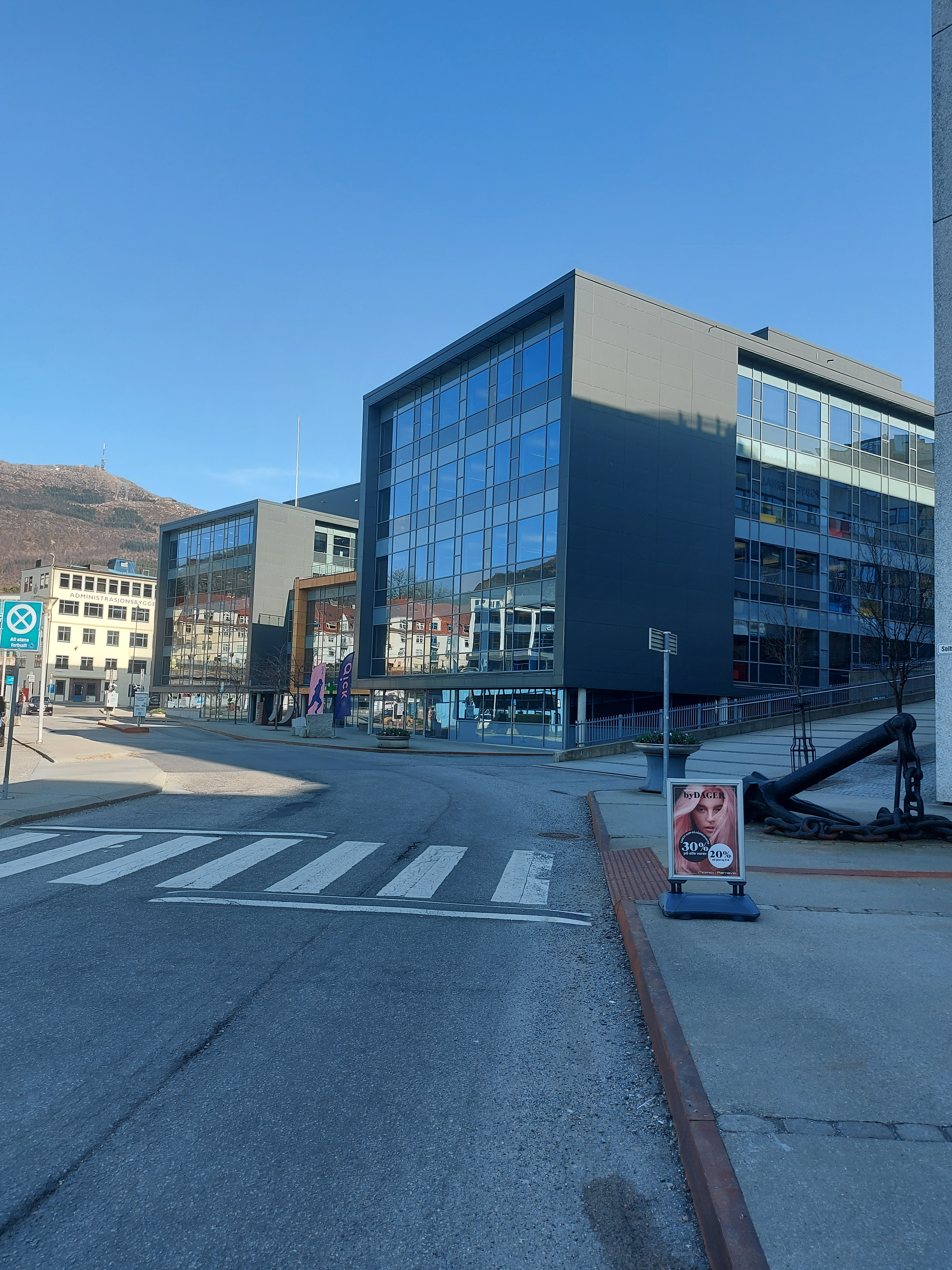
- Type: Private
- Industry: manufacture of oils and fats
- Founded: 1879
- Founder: Gottlieb Christian Rieber
- Headquarters: Bergen, Norway
- Area served: Global
- Key people: Jan Roger Bjerkestrand (CEO)
- Products: Salt; Emergency foods Omega-3 concentrates Shipping; Real Estate; Corporate venture
- Number of employees: 800
- Website: www.gcrieber.no

GC Rieber is a private company that operates within the fields of real estate, shipping, food processing and industry. The company is based in Bergen, Norway. Operations are performed by the subsidiaries GC Rieber Shipping AS, GC Rieber Skinn AS, GC Rieber Salt AS, GC Rieber Oils, GC Rieber Compact AS and GC Rieber Eiendom AS.

As of 2023, the company also owned 13.67% of the shareholding of Fløibanen AS, the company that operates Bergen's well known funicular railway.

The company was founded in 1879 by Gottlieb Christian Rieber. Gottlieb's brother, Fritz Carl Rieber, ran another company at the time, Rieber & Søn, which their father, Paul Gottlieb Rieber, had founded in 1839. On 13 January 2003, GC Rieber owned 0.75% of Rieber & Søn's shares.

On 1 June 2023, Jan Roger Bjerkestrand became the CEO of the company. Bjerkestrand has a Bachelor of Management and a Master's degree in Energy Management from BI Norwegian Business School, as well as completing the Authorized Financial Analyst Program (AFA). He previously held leadership positions at Nord Pool ASA, Hafslund ASA, and Aker ASA, and led Aker Clean Carbon AS before joining GC Rieber VivoMega AS as Managing Director in 2012.
