= Hakapik =

Norwegian weapon

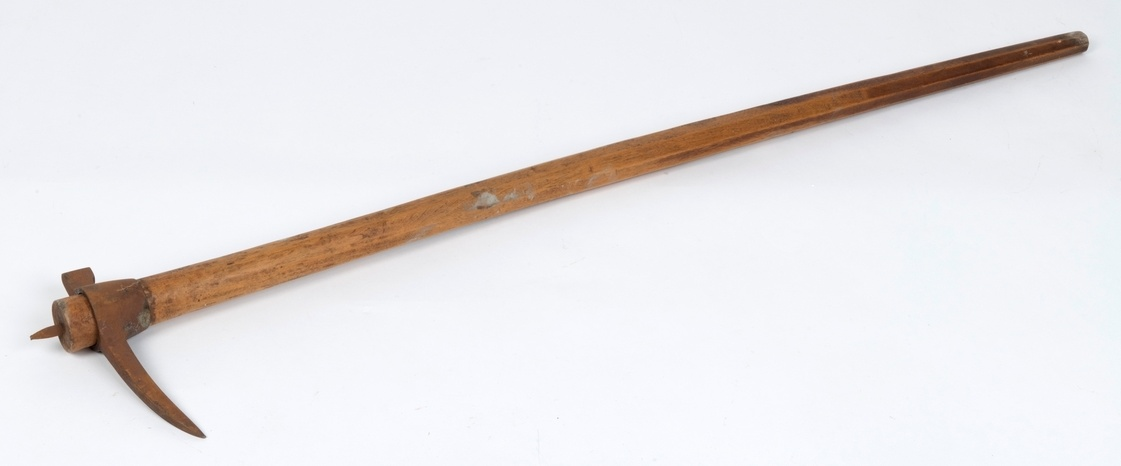
- Norwegian hakapik displayed at Slottsfjellsmuseet in Tønsberg, Norway

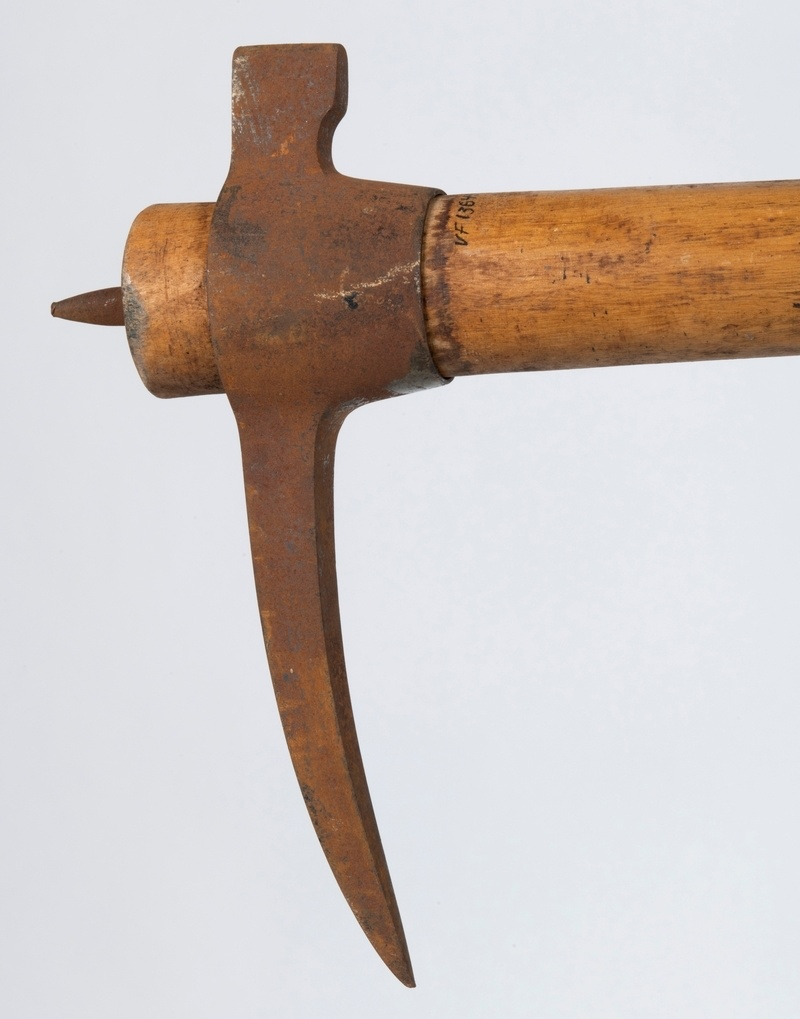
- Close-up on the club and hook end
- Classification: Hunting weapon

A hakapik (Norwegian: gaff) is a club, of Norwegian design, similar to a fishing gaff, used for killing and moving seals. The hakapik is a multipurpose hunting tool—a heavy wooden club, with a hammer head (used to crush a seal's skull), and a hook (used to drag the carcass) on the end.

Regulation Canadian hakapiks consist of a metal head or ferrule that weighs at least 340 g (12 oz) with a slightly bent spike not more than 14 cm (5.5 in) in length on one side of the ferrule and a short blunt projection not more than 1.3 cm (0.5 in) in length on the opposite side of the ferrule and that is attached to a wooden handle that measures not less than 105 cm (3.4 ft) and not more than 153 cm (5 ft) in length and not less than 3 cm and not more than 5.1 cm (2 in) in diameter.

The hakapik is favored by sealers because it allows them to kill the seal without damaging the pelt. Further, studies by American veterinary scientists on the use of the hakapik on the seal hunt carried out on Pribilof Islands of Alaska suggested that it is an efficient tool designed to kill the animal quickly and humanely when used correctly. A report by members of the Canadian Veterinary Medical Association in September 2002 confirmed this claim.

== Gallery ==
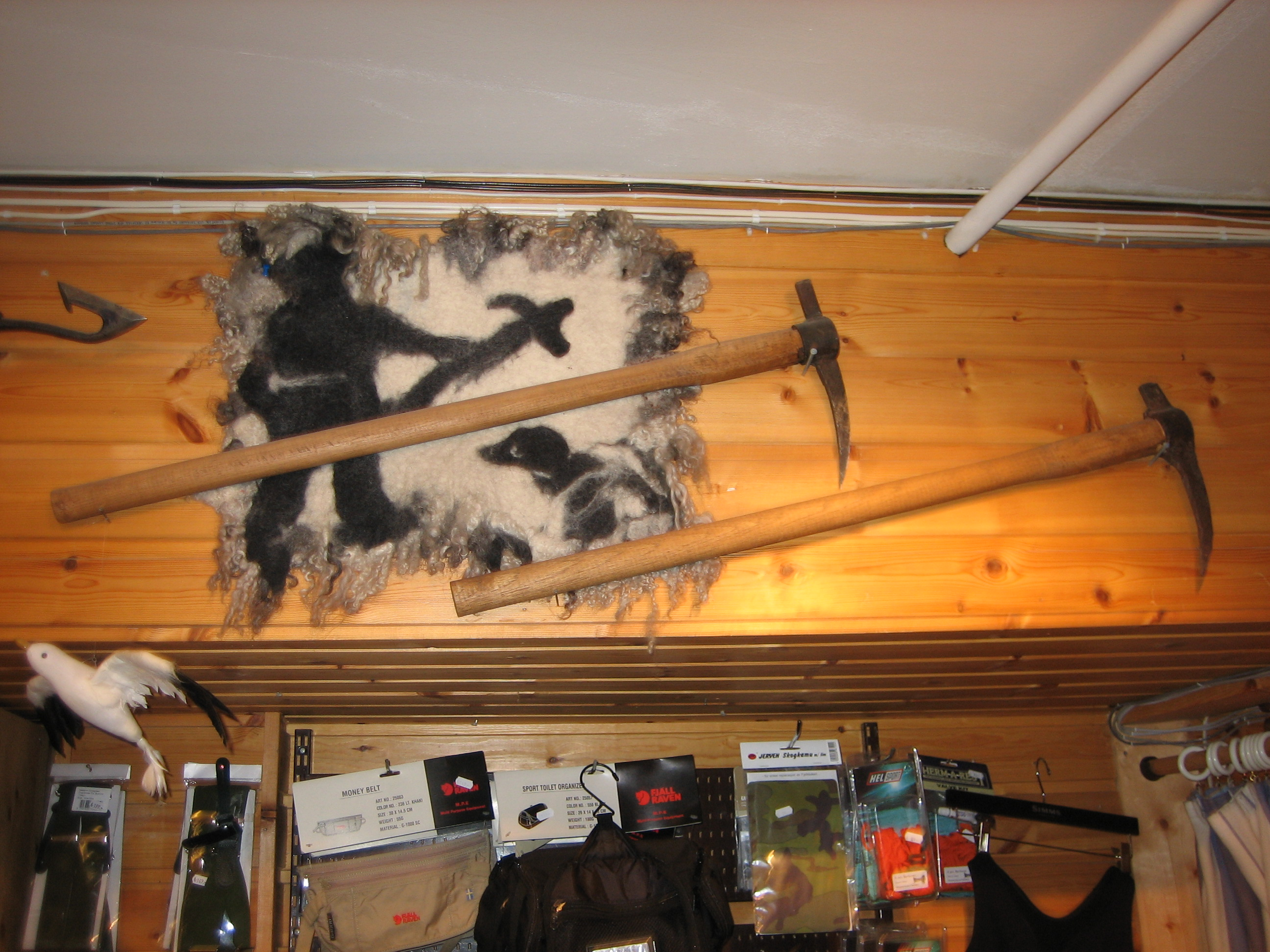
Two Norwegian hakapiks displayed on the wall of a Tromsø, Norway gun shop

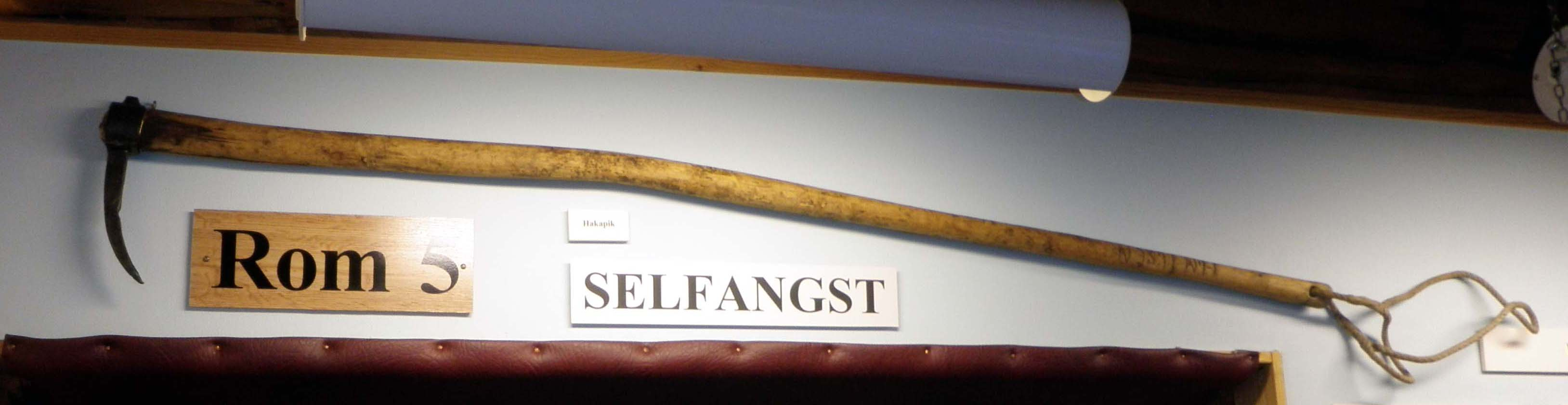
A hakapik on display at the Polar Museum in Tromsø, Norway

== See also ==
- Seal hunting
- Pickaroon
- Horseman's pick
