= Nord Pool ASA =

Logo of Nord Pool ASA

Nord Pool ASA was a company in existence between 1996 and 2010.

Reference is made to the two articles about its present successors:

- Nord Pool, previously Nord Pool Spot AS, a subsidy of Nord Pool ASA until it was spun off in 2001
- NASDAQ OMX Commodities Europe, also known as "Nord Pool" as a result of Nasdaq OMX's acquisition of some of Nord Pool ASA's assets.
