= Whitecoat =

Newborn harp or grey seal with soft, white fur

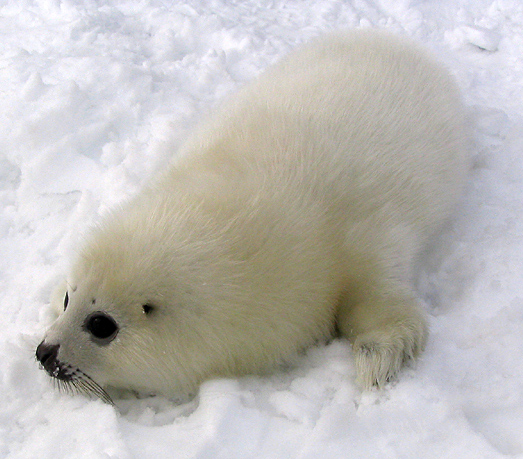

A whitecoat is a newborn harp or grey seal with soft, white fur.

== From newborn to whitecoat ==
Newborn seals have yellow fur because of amniotic fluid, and are still wet. When the pup dries, it is called a yellowcoat. The amniotic stain fades and the fur turns white within a few days, and it gets the name whitecoat. First it's called a thin whitecoat, and when it becomes visibly fatter it is a fat whitecoat.

Nursing lasts for about 12 days. Cows frequently return to their pups to suckle. While she is suckling, the mother does not eat—rather, she draws on her reserves of fatty blubber to produce the milk. Pups grow rapidly, at the end of nursing, most pups weigh 36 kg (80 lbs) or more. The mothers then leave their fully fed pups and join the bulls to mate. At this age of about 12 days, pups first become "greycoats", as grey juvenile coloring grows under their white fur, then "ragged-jackets" when white fur begins to fall out in patches.

== Hunting of whitecoats ==
The United States banned the hunting and import of whitecoats in 1972, through the Marine Mammal Protection Act. The European Economic Community banned the import of whitecoat products in 1983. Canada banned the offshore commercial hunting of whitecoats and bluebacks on December 30, 1987.

== See also ==
- Grey seal
- Harp seal
- Seal hunting
