= Elim Airport =

Airport in Alaska, United States

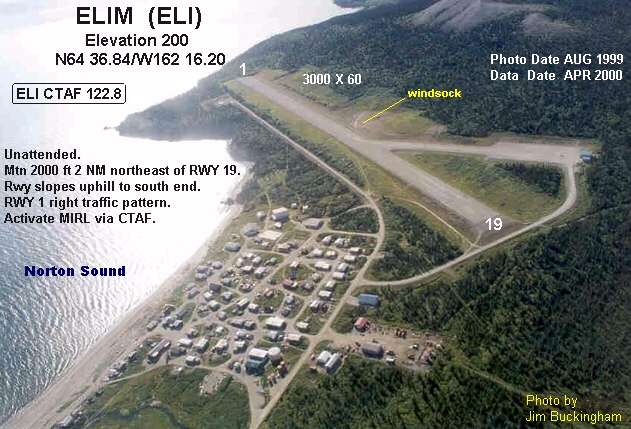
- IATA: ELI; ICAO: PFEL; FAA LID: ELI

Summary
- Airport type: Public
- Owner: State of Alaska DOT&PF - Northern Region
- Serves: Elim, Alaska
- Elevation AMSL: 162 ft (49 m)
- Coordinates: 64°36′54″N 162°16′14″W

Map
- Location of airport in Alaska

Runways
Direction	Length		Surface
Direction	ft	m	Surface
1/19	3,401	1,037	Gravel

Statistics (2018)
- Based aircraft (2018): 0
- Passengers: 4,298
- Freight: 732,000 lbs
- Source: Federal Aviation Administration

Elim Airport (IATA: ELI, ICAO: PFEL, FAA LID: ELI) is a state-owned, public-use airport located three nautical miles (6 km) southwest of the central business district of Elim, a city in the Nome Census Area of the U.S. state of Alaska.

This airport is included in the FAA's National Plan of Integrated Airport Systems for 2009–2013, where it is listed as commercial service - non-primary, an FAA category for airports with 2,500 to 10,000 passenger boardings (enplanements) per year. However, Federal Aviation Administration records for calendar year 2008 categorized it as general aviation based on 2,356 enplanements that year, a decrease of 26.1% from the 3,189 enplanements in 2007.

== Facilities ==
Elim Airport covers an area of 181 acres (73 ha) at an elevation of 162 feet (49 m) above mean sea level. It has one runway designated 1/19 with a gravel surface measuring 3,401 by 60 feet (1,037 x 18 m).

== Airlines and destinations ==
Airlines	Destinations
Bering Air	Golovin, Nome

=== Statistics ===
Carrier shares: January – December 2016
Carrier	Passengers (arriving and departing)
Bering	3,660(80.09%)
Hageland	910(19.91%)

Top domestic destinations: January – December 2016
Rank	City	Airport	Passengers
1	(Alaska) Nome, AK	Nome Airport	1,610
2	(Alaska) Unalakleet, AK	Unalakleet Airport	280
3	(Alaska) Koyuk, AK	Koyuk Alfred Adams Airport	160
4	(Alaska) Golovin, AK	Golovin Airport	130
5	(Alaska) Shaktoolik, AK	Shaktoolik Airport	40
	(Alaska) White Mountain, AK	White Mountain Airport	40

== See also ==
- List of airports in Alaska
