= Arctic River =

Waterway in Alaska

Coordinates: 66°06′12″N 165°41′29″W

Arctic River (Inupiaq: Aguġvik) is a waterway in the U.S. state of Alaska. Situated on the northwestern portion of Seward Peninsula, it rises south of Ear Mountain. It is about 25 miles (40 km) long, and flows into the west side of Shishmaref Inlet. Southeast of Ear Mountain, the course of this river is in a broad basin containing a number of small lakes. Below this basin, the river has cut a well-defined canyon. Viewed from the surrounding hills, the basin appears to be an old lake bed. A broad, flat divide, which has what appears to be an abandoned river channel across it, separates this basin from the drainage of the Kugruk River of the Arctic region. Many of the tributaries of Arctic River were staked by gold miners.
