= Cape Mountain =

Mountain in Alaska, US

- Location in Alaska
- Interactive map of Cape Mountain
- Coordinates: 65°34′35″N 168°00′27″W
- Location: Seward Peninsula, Alaska, U.S.
- Elevation: 698 m (2,289 ft)

Cape Mountain (Inupiaq: Kiŋigin) is located 3 miles (4.8 km) southeast of Cape Prince of Wales on the Seward Peninsula in the U.S. state of Alaska. It was named by the surveyor, Alfred Hulse Brooks, in 1900.

== Geography ==
Cape Mountain on Cape Prince of Wales is the northern terminus point of the Continental Divide of the Americas. At one time, it was considered to be the most western point of the United States. The mountain's elevation is 2,289 feet (698 m), with a sharp peak 2,000 feet (610 m) above the York Plateau, and a well-marked bench formation at 1,200 feet (370 m); the east base has an elevation below 500 feet (150 m). There is a sharp pinnacle at its western edge. Tin City developed on the southeastern side, while Kingegan is situated to the northwest; Teller is 53 miles (85 km) to the southeast. Cape Creek has its headwaters on the mountain's eastern side and flows southward for approximately 2 miles (3.2 km) until it reaches the Bering Sea at Tin City. The west fork's headwaters are in the mountain's uplands while the east fork's headwaters flow against the continental divide; a tributary, First Chance Creek, enters near Cape Creek's mouth.

== Geology ==
Granites and fine grained porphyries are the geological formations recorded in the mountain, which are very much jointed. From the geological map of the mountain it is noted that granite formations are massive and crystalline which has generated distinctive topographic features. The crest and the pinnacles are of granite rock with double system of jointing. Feldspar crystals are seen at the margin of these massive formations. The granites are coarse crystalline normally porphyritic, and basically with geological formations of quartz, microcline and biotite. Local glaciation has been recorded on the mountain. There is also a belt of limestone inferred as belonging to the Kigluaik series. White limestone formations are inferred as intrusives and its formations on the western side of the mountain dip away from granite. While driving a 418 feet (127 m) long adit from an elevation of 1,700 feet (520 m) into the Cape Mountain, close to the peak, for prospecting for minerals, biotite granite formation of the hill revealed cassiterite-bearing quartz of the Late Cretaceous period. The evolution of the Cape Mountain granite has been "determined to be 78.8 +/- 2.9 my old by the K/Ar method".

== Mineral prospecting ==
Tin lodes have been prospected in the mountain. Tin ore was discovered in July 1902 by W.C.J.Bartels, but attempts to explore the mountains proved unsuccessful as the engine set up at the beach, near what is now Tin City, was defective. The mountain has placer concentrates of radioactive minerals of monazite, xenotine, and zircon. The concentrates have 0.9 percent equivalent uranium (averaging about 0.03 percent equivalent uranium) attributed to thorium in the monazite content. It is inferred that the radioactive minerals found could be due to the granite formations of the mountain or to the tin deposits found in the region.
