= Tin City LRRS Airport =

- IATA: TNC; ICAO: PATC; FAA LID: TNC

Summary
- Airport type: Military
- Owner: U.S. Air Force
- Location: Tin City, Alaska
- Elevation AMSL: 269 ft / 82 m
- Coordinates: 65°33′47″N 167°55′18″W

Map
- Location of Tin City Long Range Radar Site Airport

Runways
Direction	Length		Surface
Direction	ft	m	Surface
16/34	4,700	1,433	Gravel

Statistics (1980)
- Aircraft operations: 350
- Source: Federal Aviation Administration

Tin City LRRS Airport (IATA: TNC, ICAO: PATC, FAA LID: TNC) is a military airport located one nautical mile (1.85 km) east of the historic location of Tin City, in the Nome Census Area of the U.S. state of Alaska. It is owned by the U.S. Air Force.

== Overview ==
Tin City Airport is a United States Air Force military airstrip. Its mission is to provide contractor access to the Tin City Long Range Radar Station for equipment servicing and other requirements.

The airstrip was constructed in 1951 during the construction of the Tin City Air Force Station. During the station's operational use as a staffed radar station, it provided transportation for station personnel and for supplies and equipment to be airlifted to the station. With the radar station's closure in 1983, the airstrip now provides access to the unattended site for maintenance personnel and other requirements.

It is minimally staffed by support personnel 24/7, and is not open to the public. During the winter months, it may be inaccessible due to the extreme weather conditions at the location. However, charter commercial air service is available for the military on Bering Air.

== Facilities and aircraft ==
Tin City LRRS Airport has one runway designated 16/34 with a gravel surface measuring 4,700 by 100 feet (1,433 x 30 m). For the 12-month period ending July 9, 1980, the airport had 350 aircraft operations: 57% air taxi, 29% general aviation and 14% military.

== Airlines and destinations ==
The following airlines offer scheduled passenger service at this airport:

Airlines	Destinations
Bering Air	Brevig Mission, Nome, Teller
