= Brevig Mission Airport =

Airport in Alaska, United States

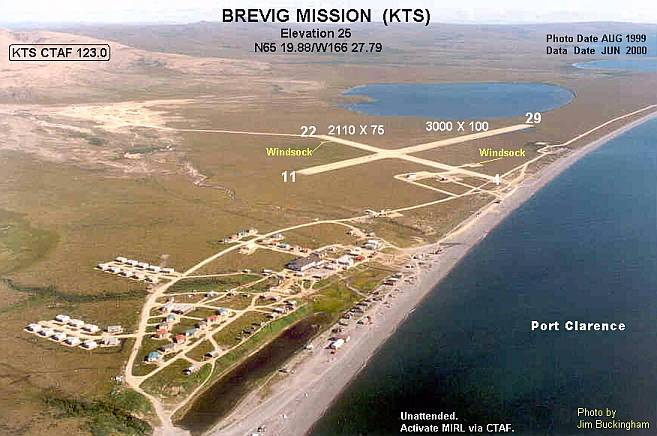
- IATA: KTS; ICAO: PFKT; FAA LID: KTS

Summary
- Airport type: Public
- Owner: Alaska DOT&PF - Northern Region
- Serves: Brevig Mission, Alaska
- Elevation AMSL: 35 ft (11 m)
- Coordinates: 65°19′53″N 166°27′57″W

Map
- Location of airport in Alaska

Runways
Direction	Length		Surface
Direction	ft	m	Surface
12/30	2,990	914	Gravel/dirt
4/22	2,110	643	Gravel

Statistics (2015)
- Aircraft operations: 0 (2014)
- Based aircraft: 0
- Passengers: 4,279
- Freight: 784,000 lbs
- Source: Federal Aviation Administration

Brevig Mission Airport (IATA: KTS, ICAO: PFKT, FAA LID: KTS) is a state-owned public-use airport located in Brevig Mission, a city in the Nome Census Area of the U.S. state of Alaska.

As per Federal Aviation Administration records, this airport had 2,696 passenger boardings (enplanements) in calendar year 2007, a decrease of 14% from the 3,152 enplanements in 2006.

== Facilities ==
Brevig Mission Airport covers an area of 344 acres (139 ha) at an elevation of 38 feet (12 m) above mean sea level. It has two gravel surfaced runways: 11/29 is 3,000 by 100 feet (914 x 30 m); 4/22 is 2,110 by 75 feet (643 x 23 m).

== Airlines and destinations ==
Airlines	Destinations
Bering Air	Nome, Teller, Wales

=== Statistics ===
Carrier shares: January – December 2015
Carrier	Passengers (arriving and departing)
Bering	2,790(64.47%)
Hageland	1,540(35.53%)

Top domestic destinations: January – December 2015
Rank	City	Airport	Passengers
1	(Alaska) Nome, AK	Nome Airport	2,050
2	(Alaska) Shishmaref, AK	Shishmaref Airport	140
3	(Alaska) Wales, AK	Wales Airport	50
4	(Alaska) Teller, AK	Teller Airport	40

== See also ==
- List of airports in Alaska
