= PATE =

PATE may refer to:

- Pectate disaccharide-lyase, an enzyme
- The ICAO airport code of Teller Airport, Teller, Alaska
