= Wales Site =

Archaeological site in Alaska, United States

- U.S. National Register of Historic Places
- U.S. National Historic Landmark District
- Alaska Heritage Resources Survey
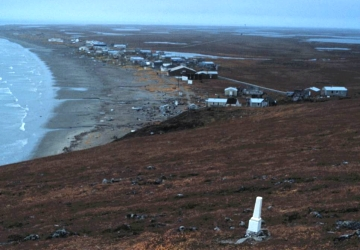
- View of the Wales Site, with the city of Wales in the background
- Location: Address restricted
- Nearest city: Wales, Alaska
- NRHP reference No.: 66000161
- AHRS No.: TEL-010

Significant dates
- Added to NRHP: October 15, 1966
- Designated NHLD: December 29, 1962

The Wales Site, whose principal component is the Kurigitavik mound, is an archaeological site on the Cape Prince of Wales, near Wales, Alaska. This well-documented site has artifacts from the Birnirk culture as well as the first discovery in Alaska of the later Thule culture. The site was designated a National Historic Landmark in 1962 for its archaeological significance.

== Description ==
The Wales site is located on the south shore of the Seward Peninsula of northwestern Alaska, very near Cape Prince of Wales, the westernmost point in North America. The area is archaeologically sensitive, with a significant number of sites clustered in an area between the native village of Wales and the former Tin City Air Force Station. The Kurigitavik Mound (whose most recent survey designation is TEL-079) has been the focus of significant archaeological activity since the 1920s, when it was first examined by the pioneering Canadian anthropologist Diamond Jenness. It was again excavated by Henry B. Collins of the Smithsonian Institution in the 1930s, and by Don Dumond in the 1970s. Most recently it has been the subject of an extensive investigation by Roger B. Harritt, beginning in the late 1990s and extending into the 2000s.

Finds at the site have included nearly complete partially subterranean house structures, including one in which seemingly ritualistically placed walrus skulls were found. Tools found at the site include barbed harpoon heads and bowls fashioned from baleen in a layer dated to the Punuk period (c. 800-1400 CE). The site is significant because it appears to include shifting cultural uses over time, between cultural groups engaged in different practices and originating either from other parts of Alaska or from Siberia.

The site was designated a National Historic Landmark in 1962 for its archaeological significance, and was listed on the National Register of Historic Places in 1966.

== See also ==
- List of National Historic Landmarks in Alaska
- National Register of Historic Places listings in Nome Census Area, Alaska
