= Marks Air Force Base =

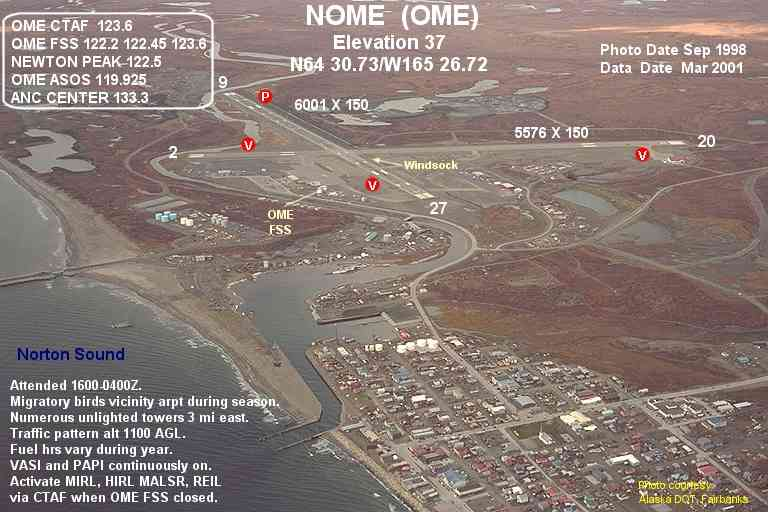
- IATA: none; ICAO: none

Summary
- Airport type: Military
- Owner: United States Air Force
- Location: Nome, Alaska
- Elevation AMSL: 38 ft / 12 m
- Coordinates: 64°30′44″N 165°26′43″W

Map
- Location of airport in Alaska

Runways
Direction	Length		Surface
Direction	ft	m	Surface
10/28	6,000	1,829	Asphalt
3/21	6,175	1,882	Asphalt
- Source: Federal Aviation Administration

Marks Air Force Base is a former United States Air Force facility located two nautical miles (4 km) west of the central business district of Nome, a city in the Nome Census Area of the U.S. state of Alaska. It was named in honor of Major Jack S. Marks, a United States Army Air Forces pilot based at Ladd Army Airfield who died when his aircraft was shot down over the Aleutians in July 1942. Following its closure, it was redeveloped into Nome Airport.

== History ==
In World War II, the civilian Nome Airport shared use of the runway with Marks Army Airfield for transfer of Lend-Lease aircraft to the Soviet Union and in 1942, for air defense of the western coast of Alaska. Marks AAF units included the 404th Bombardment Squadron (July 18–28, 1942) of the 28th Bombardment Group and the 56th Fighter Squadron (June 20 – October 20, 1942) of the 54th Fighter Group. On August 15, 1947, the Arctic Indoctrination Survival School (colloquially known as "Cool School") was formed at Marks Army Air Base.

Renamed Marks Air Force Base in 1948, the military installation was used as a fighter-interceptor forward base until they were pulled back to Galena Airport. Marks AFB closed in 1950 and an air base squadron was at Nome Airport until December 1956.

== Facilities and aircraft ==
Marks Air Force Base resided at elevation of 38 feet (11 m) above mean sea level. It has two runways with asphalt surfaces: Runway 10/28 is 6,000 by 150 feet (1,829 x 46 m) and Runway 3/21 is 6,175 by 150 feet (1,882 x 46 m).

== See also ==
- Alaska World War II Army Airfields
- Air Transport Command
- Northwest Staging Route

== Other sources ==
- Maurer, Maurer (1983). Air Force Combat Units Of World War II. Maxwell AFB, Alabama: Office of Air Force History. ISBN 0-89201-092-4.
- Maurer, Maurer (1969), Combat Squadrons of the Air Force, World War II, Air Force Historical Studies Office, Maxwell AFB, Alabama. ISBN 0-89201-097-5.
