= Shaktoolik Airport =

- IATA: SKK; ICAO: PFSH; FAA LID: 2C7

Summary
- Airport type: Public
- Owner: State of Alaska DOT&PF
- Serves: Shaktoolik, Alaska
- Elevation AMSL: 24 ft / 7 m
- Coordinates: 64°22′16″N 161°13′26″W

Map
- Location of airport in Alaska

Runways
Direction	Length		Surface
Direction	ft	m	Surface
14/32	4,001	1,220	Gravel
- Source: Federal Aviation Administration

Shaktoolik Airport (IATA: SKK, ICAO: PFSH, FAA LID: 2C7) is a state-owned public-use airport located one nautical mile (1.8 km) northwest of the central business district of Shaktoolik, a city in the Nome Census Area of the U.S. state of Alaska.

== Facilities ==
Shaktoolik Airport covers an area of 156 acres (63 ha) at an elevation of 24 feet (7 m) above mean sea level. It has one runway designated 15/33 with a 4,001 x 75 ft (1,220 x 23 m) gravel surface.

== Airlines and destinations ==
Airlines	Destinations
Bering Air	Koyuk, Nome, Unalakleet
Ryan Air	Koyuk, Unalakleet

== See also ==
- List of airports in Alaska
