= St. Michael Airport =

- IATA: SMK; ICAO: PAMK; FAA LID: SMK

Summary
- Airport type: Public
- Owner: State of Alaska DOT&PF - Northern Region
- Serves: St. Michael, Alaska
- Elevation AMSL: 98 ft / 30 m
- Coordinates: 63°29′24″N 162°06′37″W

Map
- Location of airport in Alaska

Runways
Direction	Length		Surface
Direction	ft	m	Surface
2/20	4,001	1,220	Gravel
- Source: Federal Aviation Administration

St. Michael Airport (IATA: SMK, ICAO: PAMK, FAA LID: SMK, formerly 5S8) is a state-owned, public-use airport located two nautical miles (4 km) west of the central business district of St. Michael, a city in the Nome Census Area of the U.S. state of Alaska.

== Facilities ==
St. Michael Airport covers an area of 355 acres (144 ha) at an elevation of 98 feet (30 m) above mean sea level. It has one runway designated 2/20 with a 4,001 x 75 ft (1,220 x 23 m) gravel surface.

== Airlines and destinations ==
Airlines	Destinations
Bering Air	Nome, Stebbins
Ryan Air	Stebbins, Unalakleet

== See also ==
- List of airports in Alaska
