= Serpentine River (Alaska) =

Coordinates: 66.14833°N 165.54°W

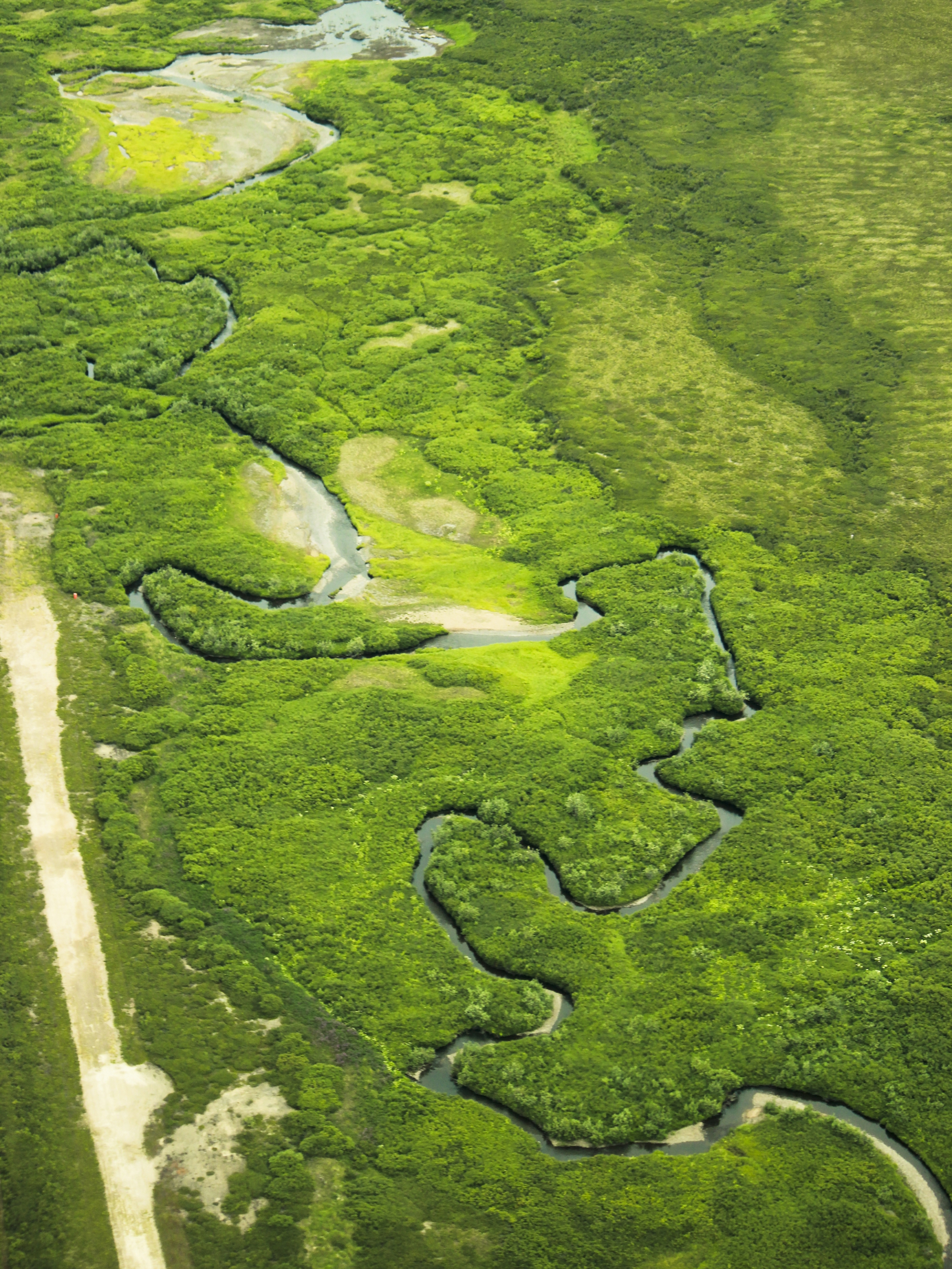
Aerial view of the Serpentine River within the Bering Land Bridge National Preserve

Serpentine River is a waterway on the Seward Peninsula in the U.S. state of Alaska. It debouches at Shishmaref Inlet from the southeast. It was explored and named in 1900 by the prospector Charles McLennan.

== Geography ==
Heading near Midnight Mountain, about 35 miles (56 km) from Shishmaref Inlet, it flows into that inlet by a very sinuous course, from which character it receives its name. The bed rock of the Serpentine River Basin above the coastal gravel belt consists of dark graphitic and feldspathic mica-schists, which form Midnight Mountain, and of crystalline limestones and mica-schists of the Kugruk group. The relations of the dark schists to the limestones were not determined, though they are regarded as belonging to the Kugruk series. In the vicinity of the hot springs these dark schists have been intruded by extensive granite masses, forming a large area of granite. This granite outcrops in needles and pinnacles, produced by weathering along a double set of joints.

Tributaries

The Schlitz and Reindeer creeks flow northwestward into Serpentine River. Bryan Creek rises to the east of Kougarok Mountain and flows northeastward into Serpentine River. Quartz Creek is the name applied to the headwaters of the South Fork of Serpentine River.

== History ==
The river was first explored and named by Charles McLennan, who, with dog team and Eskimo assistants, made a trip into the region from Shishmaref Inlet in May, 1900. McLennan was probably the first European to reach the hot springs on Spring Creek, a tributary of this river. He staked a number of claims along this creek, and prepared a map of the region, a copy of which was received in Washington in March, 1901. In September, 1901, there was a small settlement at the hot springs. Gold was found on a number of the tributaries of the middle fork of this river, and in September 1901, a number of miners were preparing to winter in the neighborhood, the principal settlement being at the hot springs.
