= Ear Mountain =

Mountain in Alaska, United States

- Location within Alaska
- Interactive map of Ear Mountain

Highest point
- Elevation: 2,329 ft (710 m)
- Coordinates: 65.92194°N 166.24639°W

Geography
- Location: Alaska
- Parent range: Isolated Mountain

Ear Mountain (Inupiaq: Iŋiġagik) is an isolated mountain located on the Seward Peninsula in the U.S. state of Alaska. The mountain, with an elevation of 2,329 feet (710 m) (GeoNames gives it elevation as 690 metres (2,260 ft)), has a belt of Cretaceous tin "granites." Though the mountain is located in an area long known for its tin deposits, it was only in 1953 and 1954 during a survey by the US Bureau of Mines that tin deposits were confirmed to be on Ear Mountain.

== Geography ==
Located on the Seward Peninsula, the Ear Mountain is 50 miles (80 km) north of Teller, and 10 miles (16 km) southwest of Shishmaref Inlet. It is an isolated mountain formation surrounded by coastal flats and valleys of streams with elevation ranging from 100–400 feet (30–122 m). The mountain is free-standing, with a summit altitude of 2,329 feet (710 m) above sea level. Its northeast slopes are moderate and it forms three peaks of 2,000 feet (610 m), 2,292 feet (699 m) and 2,329 feet (710 m). The streams rising from this mountain flow into the Arctic Ocean. However, the Arctic River and its tributaries which rise on the eastern and northeastern slopes of the mountain drain into the Shishmaref Inlet. The mountain stands on a well-marked plateau surface that has an elevation of around 1,000 feet (300 m). This plateau has been correlated (matched to similar rock strata indicating a common age of formation) with the Kugruk Plateau, and is the result of erosion further into the past than that which created the York Plateau.

The vegetation in the valleys of the plateau is thinly spread with small willow bushes while Tundra forest envelops the mountain. Below this vegetation, the soil cover consists of peat and debris of varying thickness, of a few inches to 40 feet (12 m) or more and the bedrock is permanently frozen. The mountain experiences more rain and fog than at the Shishmaref Inlet.

== Geology ==
The sedimentary rocks surrounding Ear Mountain consist mainly of quartzites and dark slates, which resemble the slates near York and have been correlated with them. The core of the mountain is a granite boss or stock intruded in these slates. Radiating from the main granite mass there is a fringe of intrusive quartz-porphyry and rhyolite dikes which arc regarded as offshoots from the main intrusion. The granites of the main mass are coarsely crystalline and consist essentially of quartz, orthoclase, and biotite. A specimen from one of the smaller bodies, examined microscopically, is made up essentially of quartz and of orthoclase and plagioclase feldspars. A narrow dike from the same region was found to consist essentially of quartz and feldspar, with muscovite, largely secondary, and a secondary growth of feldspar surrounding the larger orthoclase crystals. In Ear Mountain, a platy structure brought out by the weathering gives the rock a stratified appearance.

Rock samples collected from the northern slopes of the mountain and streams rising from the mountain have revealed traces of tin as the mountain has an established belt of Cretaceous tin "granites". It was noted that this tin content matched well with the degree of "greisen alteration". Analyses of samples of unaltered granites pointed to a tin content of less than 80 ppm, as against the disturbed granites which showed a tin content of 950 ppm. It was also reported that the tin concentrations in "unaltered granitic rocks increase progressively from porphyritic to seriate to some equigranular rocks, indicating a progressive concentration of tin with fractional crystallization." Cassiterite is found in large quantities in placers enveloping the pluton. At the beginning of the 20th century, there were plans to lay a railroad up to Port Clarence for the purpose of tin mining.
