= Stebbins Airport =

- IATA: WBB; ICAO: PAAS; FAA LID: WBB

Summary
- Airport type: Public
- Owner: State of Alaska DOT&PF - Northern Region
- Serves: Stebbins, Alaska
- Elevation AMSL: 14 ft (4.3 m)
- Coordinates: 63°30′57″N 162°16′41″W

Map
- Location of airport in Alaska

Runways
Direction	Length		Surface
Direction	ft	m	Surface
5/23	3,000	914	Gravel
- Source: Federal Aviation Administration

Stebbins Airport (IATA: WBB, ICAO: PAAS, FAA LID: WBB) is a state-owned public-use airport located in Stebbins, in the Nome Census Area, Alaska, United States.

== Facilities ==
Stebbins Airport covers an area of 110 acres (45 ha) at an elevation of 14 feet (4 m) above mean sea level. It has one runway designated 5/23 with a 3,000 x 60 ft (914 x 18 m) gravel surface.

== Airlines and destinations ==
Airlines	Destinations
Bering Air	Nome, St. Michael, Unalakleet
Ryan Air	Unalakleet

== See also ==
- List of airports in Alaska
