= Sarichef Island =

Sarichef
Native name: Qigiqtaq
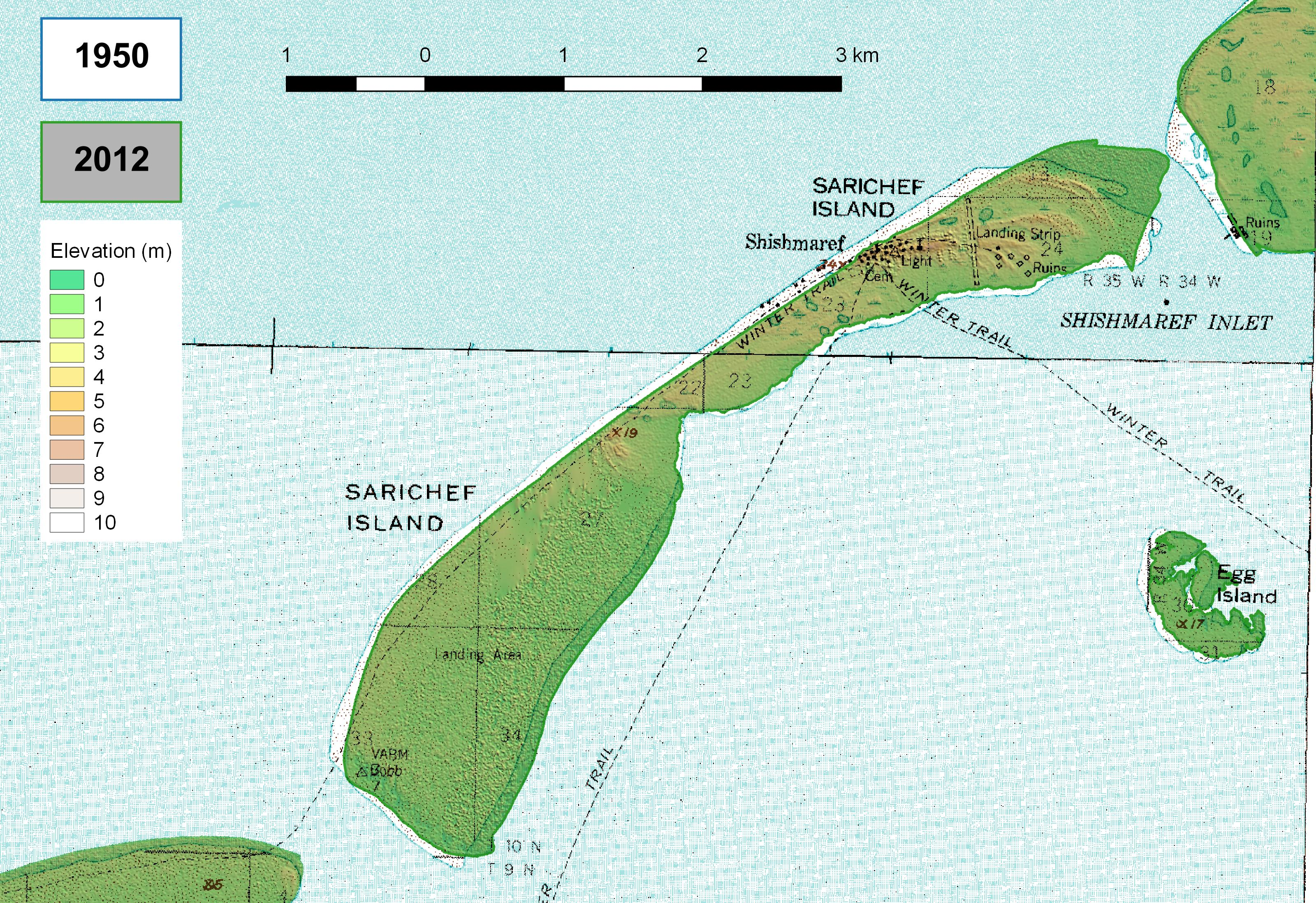
- Elevation map

- Location within Alaska

Geography
- Location: Nome Census Area, Alaska
- Coordinates: 66°14′41″N 166°6′25″W
- Length: 7 km (4.3 mi)
- Highest elevation: 6 m (20 ft)

Administration
- United States

Demographics
- Population: 591 (2006)

Sarichef Island (Inupiaq: Qigiqtaq or Kigiqtaq, Russian: Остров Сарычева) is a long and narrow coastal island on the Chukchi Sea-facing coast of Alaska. It is located at the mouth of the Shishmaref Inlet, Kotzebue-Kobuk Low. It is located hundred miles east of Russia, which can be seen on clear days. The highest point on the island is the 6-meter cemetery in Shishmaref. The island is rapidly disappearing due to the sea level rise associated with global warming.

Sarichef Island is 7 km (4.3 mi) in length. The highest point on the island is 6 m (19.7 ft) above sea level.

Shishmaref town and Shishmaref Airport are located on this island.

This island was named in 1816 by explorer Lt. Otto von Kotzebue, of the Imperial Russian Navy, "in the honor of his worthy" Vice Admiral Gavril Sarychev (1763–1831).

== See also ==
- Arctic shrinkage
- Sea Islands
