= Unalakleet River =

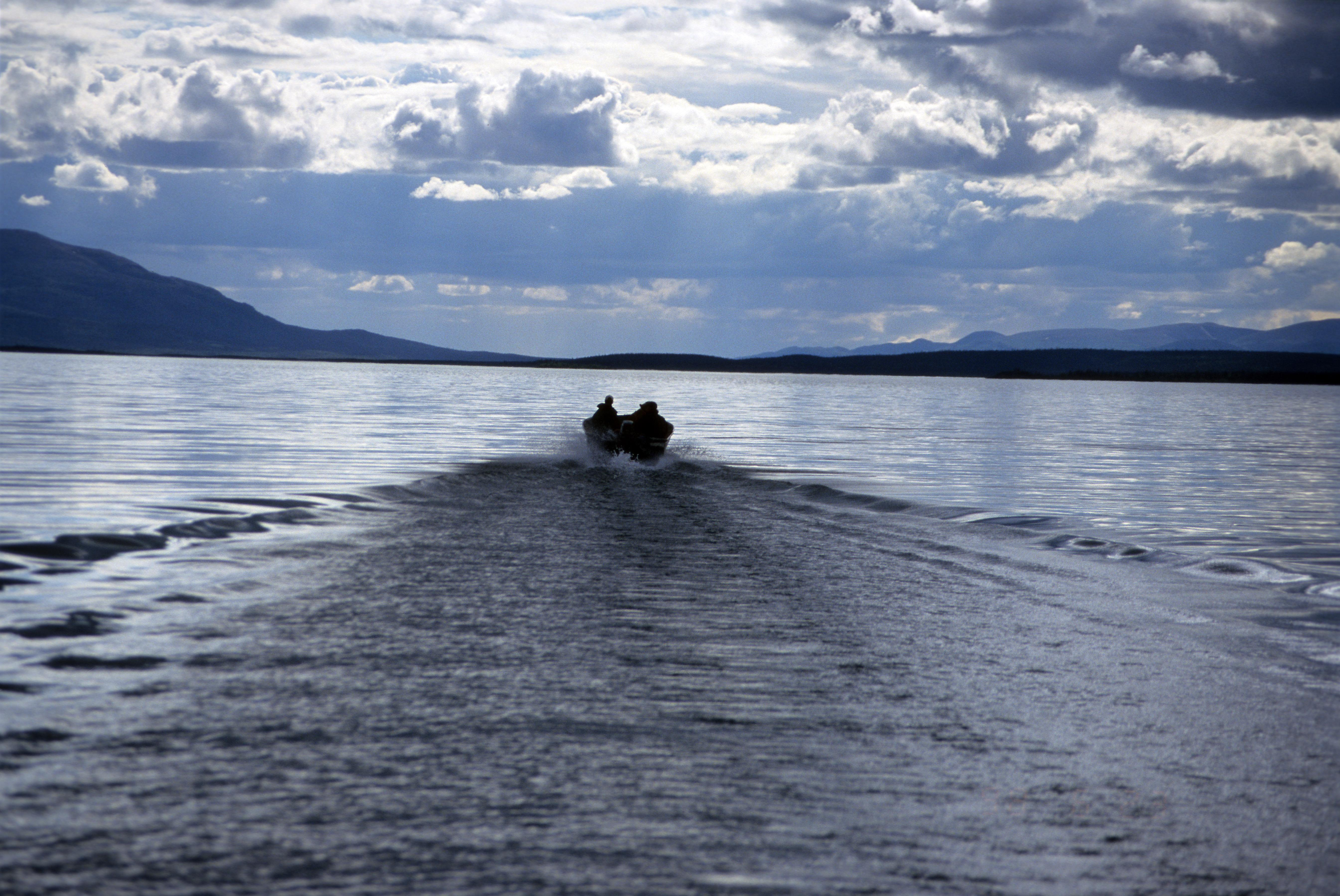
- Boat on Unalakleet River

- Location of the mouth of the Unalakleet River in Alaska
- Native name: Uŋalaqłiit Kurgat (Inupiaq)

Location
- Country: United States
- State: Alaska
- Census Area: Yukon–Koyukuk, Nome

Physical characteristics
- Source: Kaltag Mountains
  - location: Yukon–Koyukuk Census Area
  - coordinates: 64°20′27″N 159°12′12″W
  - elevation: 2,329 ft (710 m)
- Mouth: Norton Sound
  - location: Near Unalakleet, Nome Census Area
  - coordinates: 63°52′10″N 160°47′16″W
  - elevation: 3 ft (0.91 m)
- Length: 90 mi (140 km)

National Wild and Scenic River
- Type: Wild
- Designated: December 2, 1980

The Unalakleet River (Iñupiaq: Uŋalaqłiit Kurgat) in the U.S. state of Alaska flows southwest 90 miles (145 km) from the Kaltag Mountains to near the town of Unalakleet, on Norton Sound of the Bering Sea.

In 1980, the upper 80 miles (130 km) of the river was protected as "wild" as part of the National Wild and Scenic Rivers System. Managed by the Bureau of Land Management, the wild segment of the river is fished for king and silver salmon, Arctic grayling, and char. Other forms of recreation along the river include boating and camping in summer and snowmobiling, dog mushing, ice fishing, hunting, and trapping in winter. For part of its length, the Iditarod Trail runs along the Unalakleet.

== History ==
The river's name is Inupiat for "place where the east wind blows." Historically, the river provided a good connection between native coastal settlements and those in the interior along the Yukon River. The route, including what is called the Kaltag Portage, was the shortest connection between the Yukon and Norton Sound.

Eskimos have lived near the Unalakleet for many centuries. House pits in the region date to 200 B.C. In the 1830s, after the Russian-American Company established trading posts at St. Michael and Unalakleet, Lieutenant Lavrenty Zagoskin of the Imperial Russian Navy filed the first non-native reports about the Unalakleet.

In 1898, herders from Lapland settled along the river, where they established reindeer herds. Shortly thereafter, prospectors seeking gold on the nearby Seward Peninsula traveled over the Kaltag Portage and downriver to the coast. Subsequent changes included a telegraph line and associated cabins along the river and establishment of a mail route.

== See also ==
- List of National Wild and Scenic Rivers
- List of rivers of Alaska
