= Gleb Shishmaryov =

Russian admiral (1781–1835)

Gleb Shishmaryov

Gleb Semyonovich Shishmaryov (Russian: Глеб Семёнович Шишмарёв; 1781 - November 3, 1835, Saint Petersburg) was a rear admiral of the Imperial Russian Navy. He is reputed for having surveyed the then little-known coast of Alaska as navigator. In 1815–1818 he accompanied Otto von Kotzebue on his voyage to Alaska and around the world.

In 1820 Shishmaryov returned to Alaska in command of the ship Blagonamerennyi (Good Intent), accompanied by Lt. Mikhail Nikolaevich Vasiliev (1770–1847) on the ship Otkrytie (Discovery). Shishmaref and Vasiliev entered the Chukchi Sea and explored the coast of Alaska from Kotzebue Sound to Icy Cape and later from Norton Sound to Cape Newenham.

The name of this Russian explorer is sometimes transliterated as "Shishmaref" in the United States; the town of Shishmaref, Alaska, and the Shishmaref Inlet have been named after him.
