= Golovin Airport =

- IATA: GLV; ICAO: PAGL; FAA LID: GLV

Summary
- Airport type: Public
- Owner: State of Alaska DOT&PF - Northern Region
- Serves: Golovin, Alaska
- Elevation AMSL: 59 ft (18 m)
- Coordinates: 64°33′02″N 163°00′26″W

Map
- Location of airport in Alaska

Runways
Direction	Length		Surface
Direction	ft	m	Surface
2/20	4,000	1,219	Gravel
- Source: Federal Aviation Administration

Golovin Airport (IATA: GLV, ICAO: PAGL, FAA LID: GLV, formerly N93) is a state-owned public-use airport located in Golovin, a city in the Nome Census Area of the U.S. state of Alaska.

As per Federal Aviation Administration records, the airport had 1,753 passenger boardings (enplanements) in calendar year 2010, an increase of 8.4% from the 1,617 enplanements in 2009. This airport is included in the FAA's National Plan of Integrated Airport Systems for 2011–2015, which categorized it as a general aviation airport.

== Facilities ==
Golovin Airport covers an area of 225 acres (91 ha) at an elevation of 59 feet (18 m) above mean sea level. It has one runway designated 2/20 with a gravel surface measuring 4,000 by 75 feet (1,219 x 23 m).

== Airlines and destinations ==
The following airlines offer scheduled passenger service:

Airlines	Destinations
Bering Air	Elim, White Mountain

== See also ==
- List of airports in Alaska
