= Tin City Long Range Radar Site =

United States Air Force radar station

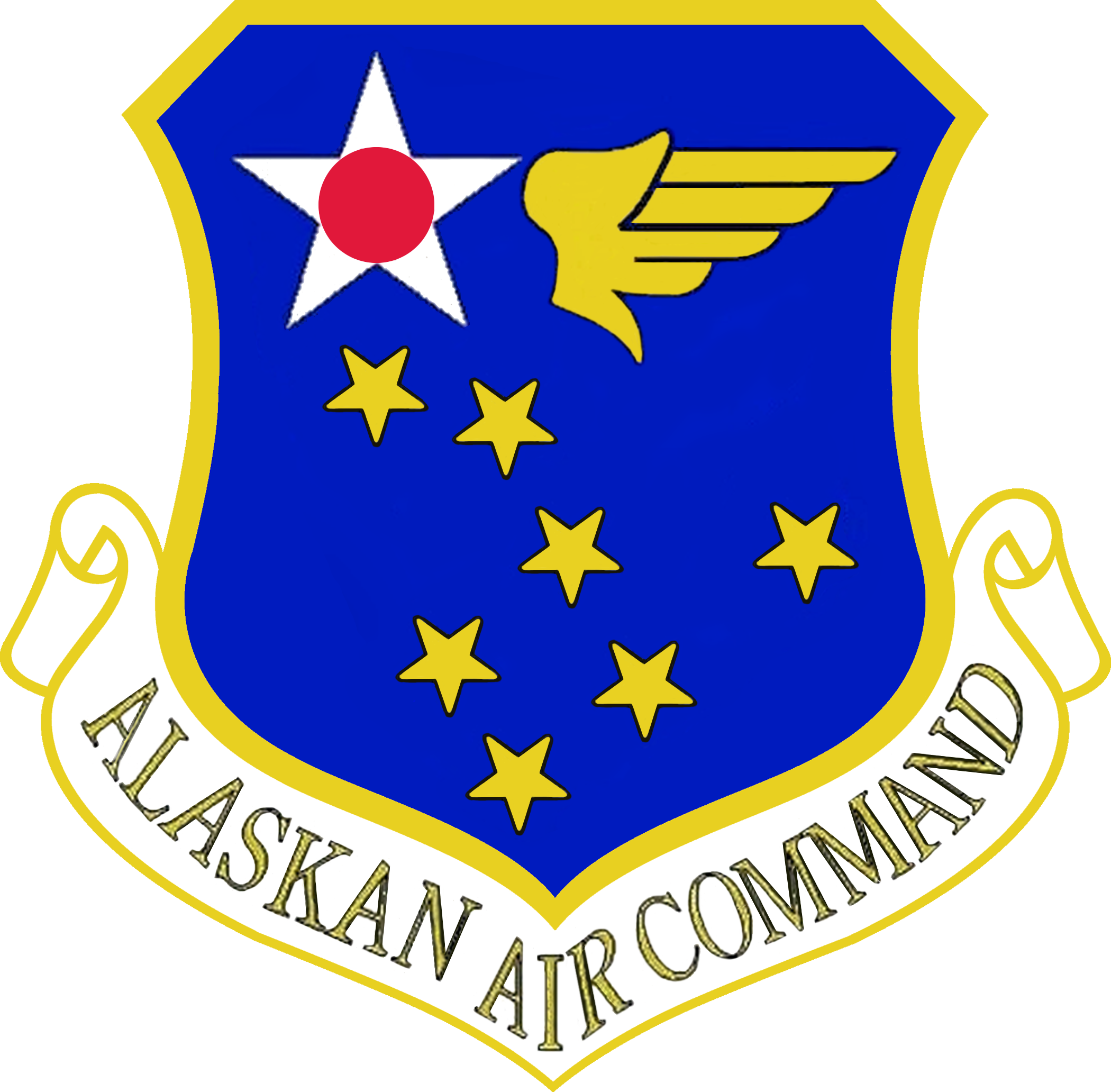
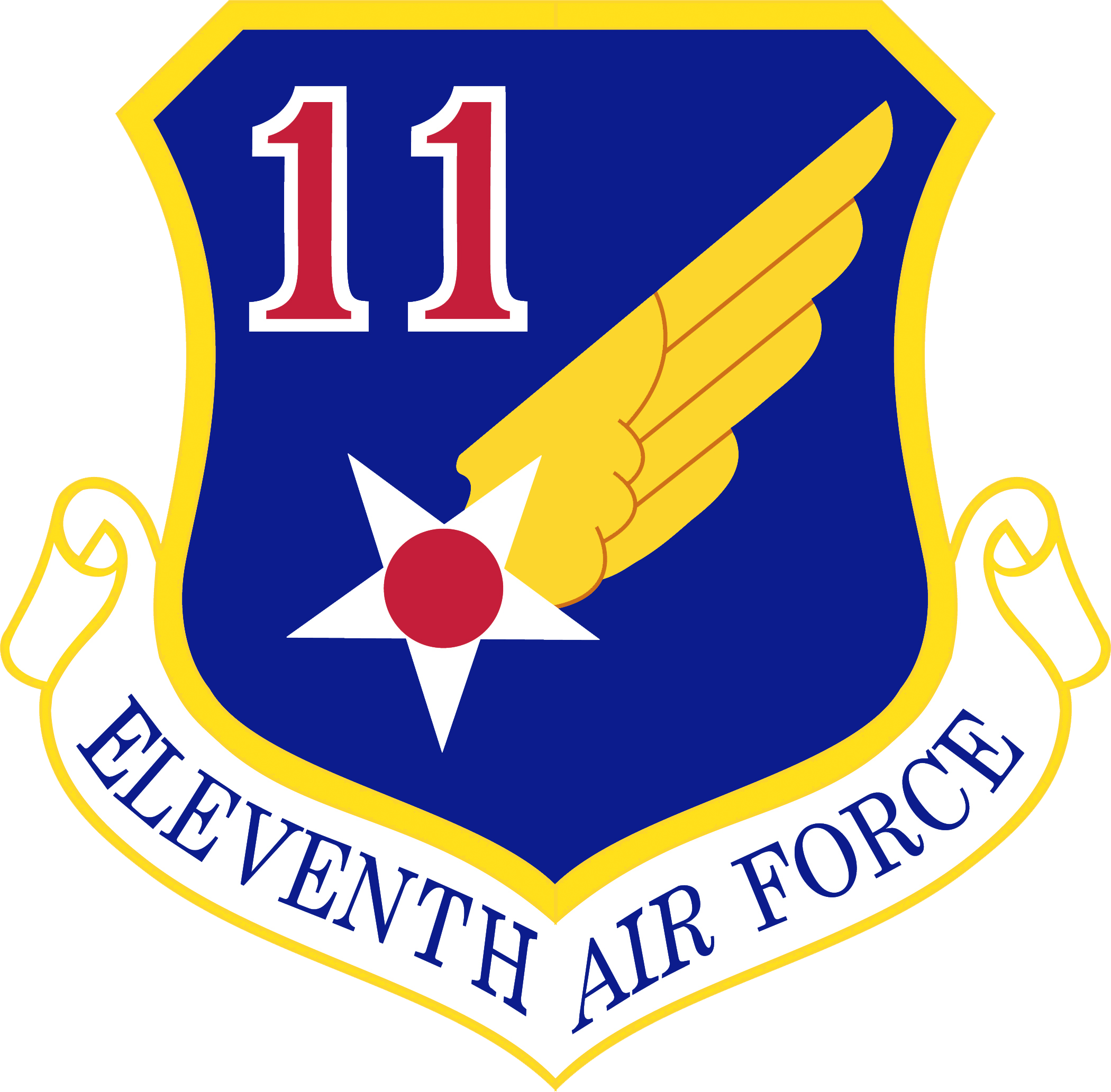
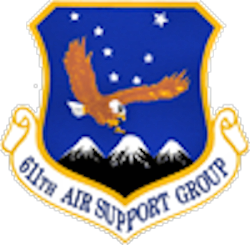
Tin City Air Force Station Tin City Long Range Radar Site
- Part of Eleventh Air Force (PACAF)
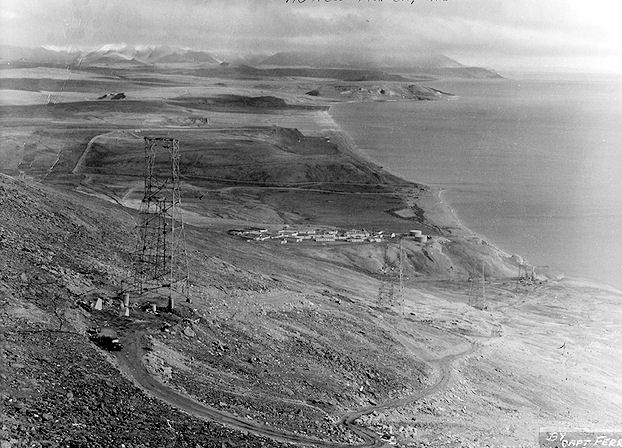
- Tin City Air Force Station

Site information
- Type: Air force station
- Controlled by: United States Air Force

Location
- Location of Tin City AFS, Alaska
- Coordinates: 65°34′33″N 168°00′43″W

Site history
- Built: 1951
- In use: 1953-Present

Garrison information
- Garrison: 710th Aircraft Control and Warning Squadron (1953-1983)

Tin City Long Range Radar Site is a United States Air Force radar station. It is located 106.3 miles (171.1 km) west-northwest of Nome, Alaska. It is the former Tin City Air Force Station (AAC ID: F-04, LRR ID: A-11).

The radar surveillance station was closed on 1 November 1983, and was re-designated as a Long Range Radar (LRR) site as part of the Alaska Radar System. Today, it remains active as part of the Alaska NORAD Region under the command of the 611th Air and Space Operations Center, Elmendorf AFB, Alaska.

== History ==
Tin City AFS was a continental defence radar station constructed to provide the United States Air Force early warning of an attack by the Soviet Union on Alaska. It was one of the ten original radar surveillance sites constructed during the early 1950s to establish a permanent air defense system in Alaska.

The station was located at the westernmost tip of the Seward Peninsula, also the most westerly point of land on the North American continent. Two small islands, the Little and Big Diomedes, are located in the Bering Straits 25 miles west of the station. Little Diomede Island is part of the United States, while Russia claims Big Diomede, making it the closest Russian territory to the United States. The Asian mainland of Siberia is 48 miles to the west of the station. On a clear day, both islands and the Siberian coastline are visible. The radars were located on the southern base Cope Mountain, at an elevation of 2,275 feet.

Construction of the station, first designated Cape Prince of Wales AFS (after the geographic location Cape Prince of Wales), began on 9 September 1950 and was completed in late 1952. The Army Transportation Corps undertook the project, code name Mona Lisa, of getting the initial supplies and equipment to the construction site. The only means of getting construction materials and supplies to the site was by barge or Navy LSTs, however this was restricted to when the sea was not frozen and had to be unloaded 3 miles from the proposed site. Initially, there were no roads, which had to be built as part of the construction effort. Each item had to be hauled along the beach 65°33′33″N 167°57′01″W to the area nearest the construction site, then inland to the permanent storage area.

The ground support station was located on a plateau, at an elevation of 270 feet, located in a small canyon between the airstrip and radar site 65°33′54″N 167°58′00″W. A 4,500' airstrip was constructed on a plateau east of the ground support station, with a gravel runway capable of C-130 landings. 65°33′44″N 167°55′24″W The station consisted of a power/heating plant, water and fuel storage tanks, gymnasium and other support office buildings. Two other buildings contained living quarters, work areas, and recreational facilities plus opportunities for such sports as skiing, skating, horseshoes, and basketball. The buildings were connected by enclosed portals so no one needed to go outside in winter unless absolutely necessary. Tours at the station were limited to one year because of the psychological strain and physical hardships. Mail was usually delivered twice a week. The inaccessibility made the personnel at the site responsible for maintenance if anything went wrong. Water mains occasionally froze and ruptured.

The radar site was connected to the base station by a 7,200' aerial tramway, the longest in North America. All large equipment was required to be disassembled then re-assembled at the top camp radar station. The tramway cables were constantly breaking because of high winds and ice, and fog and the extreme cold made repairs hazardous. Ice 16 inches thick built up on the cables in winter.

The 710th Aircraft Control and Warning Squadron (AC&W Sq), activated on 8 December 1952, provided information 24/7 to the air defense Direction Center at Murphy Dome AFS near Fairbanks, where it was analyzed to determine range, direction altitude speed and whether or not aircraft were friendly or hostile. Radars operated at the station were AN/FPS-3, and an AN/FPS-20A. The station name was changed to Tin City Air Force Station on 1 September 1959.

Communications were initially provided by a high frequency radio system which proved unreliable because of atmospheric disturbances. The Alaskan Air Command, after investigating various options, decided to build the White Alice Communications System, a system of Air Force-owned tropospheric scatter and microwave radio relay sites operated by the Air Force Communications Service (AFCS). The Tin City site 65°34′58″N 167°56′25″W was activated in 1957. It was inactivated in 1979, and replaced by an Alascom owned and operated satellite earth terminal as part of an Air Force plan to divest itself of the obsolete White Alice Communications System and transfer the responsibility to a commercial firm.

Over the years, the equipment at the station was upgraded or modified to improve the efficiency and accuracy of the information gathered by the radars. In 1983, Tin City AFS received a new AN/FPS-117 minimally attended radar under Alaskan Air Command's SEEK IGLOO program . It was designed to transmit aircraft tracking data via satellite to the Alaskan NORAD Regional Operations Control Center (ROCC) at Elmendorf AFB.

No longer needed, the 710th AC&W Sq was inactivated on 1 November 1983 and the station re-designated as a Long Range Radar (LRR) Site. This left only contractor personnel to maintain the site radar. In 1990, jurisdiction of the Tin City LRR Site was transferred to Eleventh Air Force with the re-designation of AAC.

In 1998 Pacific Air Forces (PACAF) initiated "Operation Clean Sweep", in which abandoned Cold War stations in Alaska were remediated and the land restored to its previous state. After years of neglect the facilities at the station had lost any value they had when the site was closed. The site remediation of the radar, support and White Alice communication station was carried out by the 611th Civil Engineering Squadron at Elmendorf AFB, and remediation work was completed by 2005.

== Current status ==
Today very little of the former Tin City Air Force Station remains. The site is controlled by the PACAF's 611th Air and Space Operations Center, based at Elmendorf AFB. The site is maintained by ARCTEC Alaska Inc. civilian contractors and they access the site by former support airstrip, now the Tin City LRRS Airport (ICAO: PATC, TC LID: TNC) and provide maintenance and support when needed to maintain the radar system.

Tin City ops reported to Campion AFS (near Galena), not to Murphy Dome.

== Air Force units and assignments ==
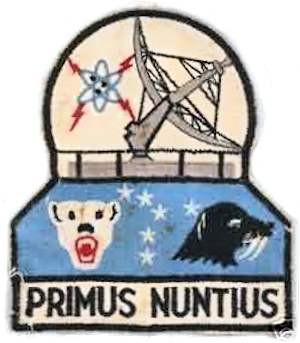
Emblem of the 710th Aircraft Control and Warning Squadron

=== Units ===
- 710th Aircraft Control and Warning Squadron

Activated 8 December 1953
Inactivated 1 November 1983

=== Assignments ===
- 160th Aircraft Control and Warning Group, 8 December 1952
- 548th Aircraft Control and Warning Group, 1 February 1953
- 11th Air Division, 8 April 1953
- 5060th Aircraft Control and Warning Group, 1 November 1957
- 11th Air Division, 1 October 1959
- 5070th Air Defense Wing, 1 August 1960
- Alaskan Air Command, 1 October 1961
- 531st Aircraft Control and Warning Group (later 11th Tactical Control Group), 15 November 1977 – 1 November 1983

== See also ==
- Tin City, Alaska
- Alaskan Air Command
