= Herbie Nayokpuk =

Inupiaq musher (1929–2006)

- Born: June 12, 1929; Shishmaref, Alaska
- Died: December 2, 2006 (aged 77); Anchorage, Alaska
- Occupation: Musher

Herbie Nayokpuk (June 12, 1929 – December 2, 2006) (Iñupiaq pronunciation of last name: Niiqpaq) nicknamed the "Shishmaref Cannonball", was an Inupiaq musher, known for his cheerful and straight-ahead demeanor. It is said that "no musher in Iditarod history has been more admired, more respected or better liked than Herbie Nayokpuk".

Iditarod Finishes
Year	Position	Time
1973	5th	21d 11h 0m 19s
1974	3rd	21d 18h 28m 42s
1975	4th	14d 20h 29m 7s
1979	Scratched
1980	2nd	14d 20h 32m 12s
1981	7th	12d 22h 17m 45s
1982	7th	16d 14h 8m 21s
1983	4th	12d 22h 4m 28s
1985	8th	18d 17h 20m 0s
1987	25th	13d 10h 27m 47s
1988	6th	13d 3h 26m 44s

== Life and career ==
Nayokpuk was born in Shishmaref in 1929. He was one of the original mushers to run the Iditarod Trail Sled Dog Race in 1973. He also represented Alaska at the presidential inauguration of Ronald Reagan in 1981. He ended up running the Iditarod 11 times. He never won, but he made some notably daring attempts in extreme weather conditions. He suffered a stroke after one race and competed in another despite having just recovered from a heart attack. He was also an accomplished Inupiaq artist.

== Death and legacy ==
Nayokpuk died at the age of 77 at the Alaska Native Medical Center in Anchorage, Alaska, after suffering a massive stroke at his home in mid-November and then lapsing into a coma. He is buried in Shishmaref. Each year since 2007, an Iditarod musher is awarded with the "Herbie Nayokpuk Memorial Award", which goes to the musher "who best epitomizes Herbie Nayokpuk's spirit of mushing the Iditarod".
