= Tin City, Alaska =

Abandoned town in Alaska, US

Tin City
- Ghost town
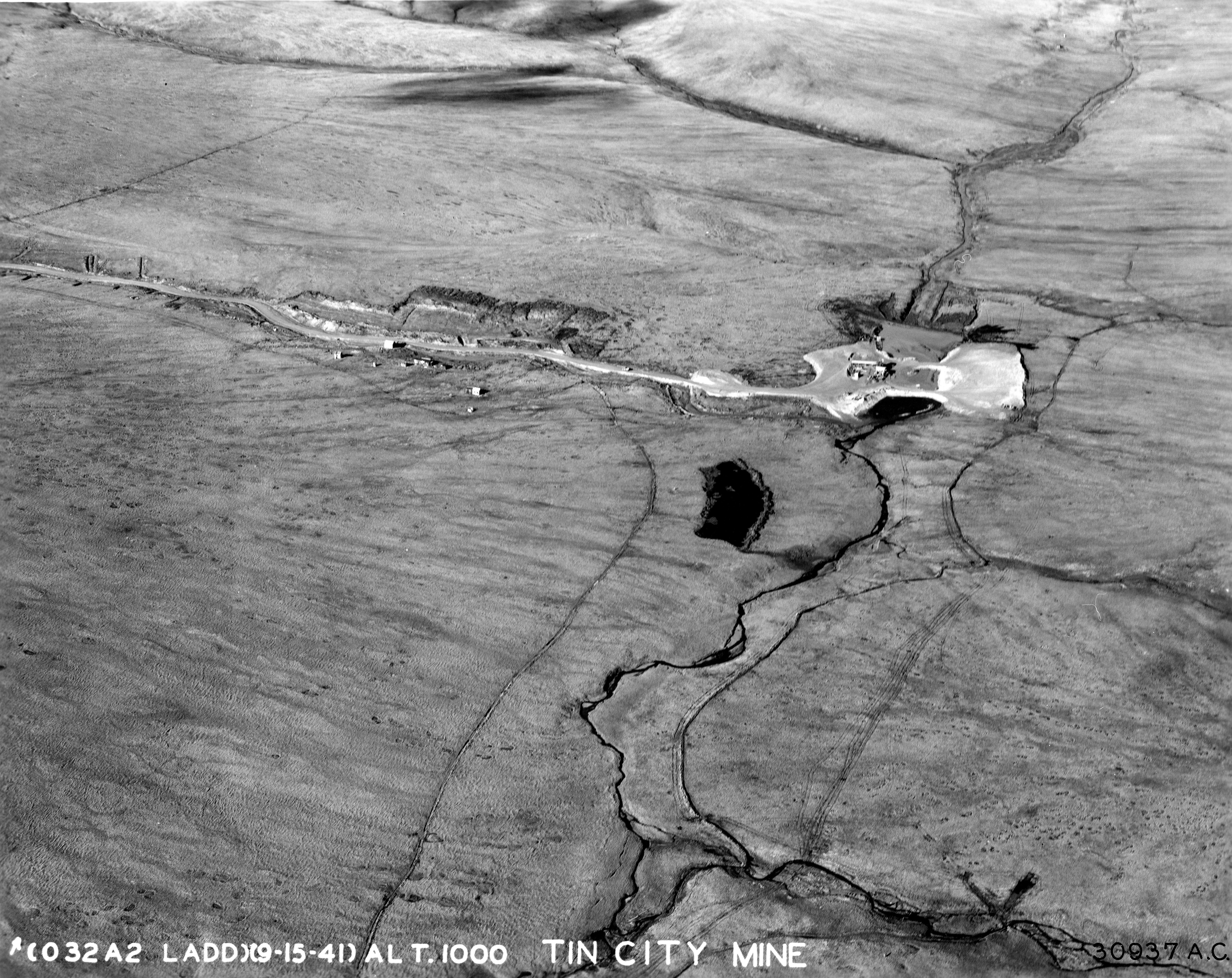
- Tin City in the 1940s
- Interactive map of Tin City
- Coordinates: 65°33′31″N 167°56′53″W

Population
  - Total: 0

Tin City (Inupiaq: Tupqaġruk) is an abandoned town except for a nearby minimally staffed radar station, in the Nome Census Area of the U.S. state of Alaska. It is situated at the mouth of Cape Creek, on the Bering Sea coast, 5 miles (8 km) southeast of Cape Prince of Wales on the Seward Peninsula.

They also have the nearby Tin City LRRS (Long Range Radar Site) Airport.

== History ==
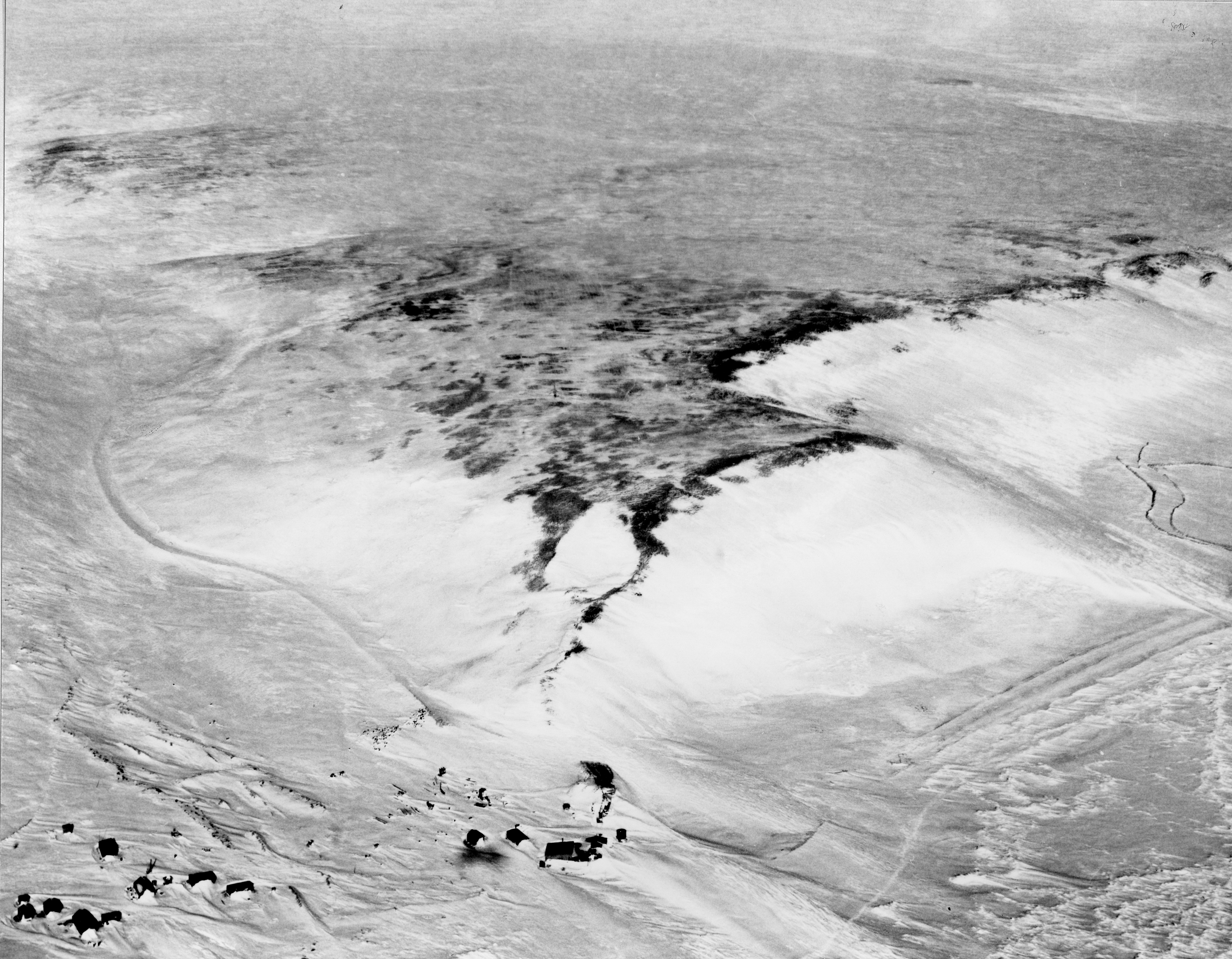
Tin City

Tin ore was discovered on Cape Mountain in July 1902. A mining camp was established at the base of the mountain in 1903 and the Tin City post office was opened in 1904. By 1907 it had a few widely scattered houses and two companies operating out of the village. The post office was closed in 1909.

== Climate ==
Tin City has a tundra climate (ET) with short but cool summers and long, bitterly cold winters. Precipitation peaks during August. Snowfall is the heaviest during early winter.

Climate data for Tin City, Alaska
Month	Jan	Feb	Mar	Apr	May	Jun	Jul	Aug	Sep	Oct	Nov	Dec	Year
Record high °F (°C)	48 (9)	41 (5)	38 (3)	47 (8)	58 (14)	74 (23)	75 (24)	70 (21)	64 (18)	53 (12)	43 (6)	40 (4)	75 (24)
Mean daily maximum °F (°C)	7.9 (−13.4)	−0.4 (−18.0)	4.2 (−15.4)	13.3 (−10.4)	30.6 (−0.8)	42.8 (6.0)	49.9 (9.9)	48.9 (9.4)	43.1 (6.2)	30.6 (−0.8)	19.8 (−6.8)	7.8 (−13.4)	24.9 (−4.0)
Daily mean °F (°C)	2.7 (−16.3)	−5.3 (−20.7)	−1.0 (−18.3)	8.5 (−13.1)	26.8 (−2.9)	38.5 (3.6)	45.9 (7.7)	45.6 (7.6)	39.8 (4.3)	27.5 (−2.5)	15.7 (−9.1)	3.0 (−16.1)	20.6 (−6.3)
Mean daily minimum °F (°C)	−2.6 (−19.2)	−10.2 (−23.4)	−6.1 (−21.2)	3.6 (−15.8)	23.0 (−5.0)	34.2 (1.2)	41.9 (5.5)	42.2 (5.7)	36.5 (2.5)	24.4 (−4.2)	11.6 (−11.3)	−1.8 (−18.8)	16.4 (−8.7)
Record low °F (°C)	−37 (−38)	−44 (−42)	−41 (−41)	−26 (−32)	−6 (−21)	21 (−6)	31 (−1)	31 (−1)	21 (−6)	−4 (−20)	−18 (−28)	−42 (−41)	−44 (−42)
Average precipitation inches (mm)	0.56 (14)	0.29 (7.4)	0.37 (9.4)	0.41 (10)	0.33 (8.4)	0.65 (17)	1.80 (46)	2.41 (61)	1.49 (38)	1.87 (47)	1.52 (39)	0.50 (13)	12.2 (310.2)
Average snowfall inches (cm)	5.7 (14)	2.5 (6.4)	3.4 (8.6)	4.0 (10)	2.4 (6.1)	0.7 (1.8)	0.2 (0.51)	0.3 (0.76)	1.7 (4.3)	13.6 (35)	14.6 (37)	5.1 (13)	54.2 (137.47)
Source: WRCC
