= Nome Airport =

Airport in Nome, Alaska, United States

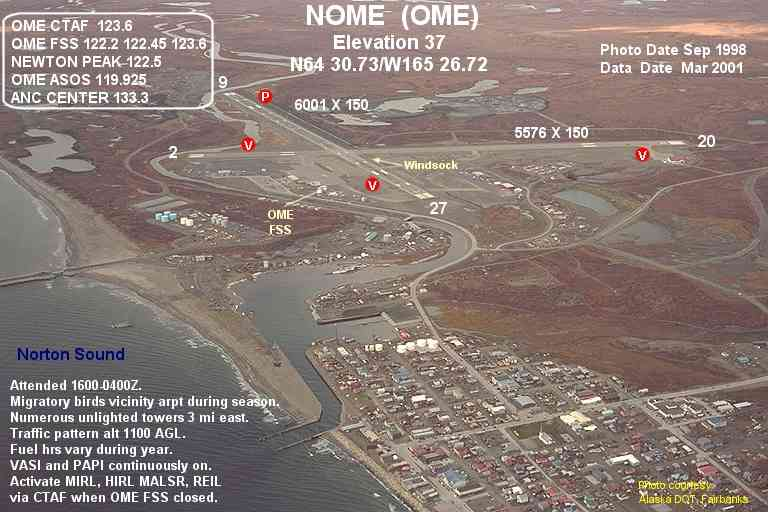
- IATA: OME; ICAO: PAOM; FAA LID: OME; WMO: 70200

Summary
- Airport type: Public
- Owner: Alaska DOT&PF - Northern Region
- Serves: Nome, Alaska
- Hub for: Bering Air
- Elevation AMSL: 41 ft (12 m)
- Coordinates: 64°30′44″N 165°26′43″W

Map
- Location of airport in Alaska

Runways
Direction	Length		Surface
Direction	ft	m	Surface
10/28	6,009	1,832	Asphalt
3/21	6,176	1,882	Asphalt

Statistics (2020)
- Aircraft operations: 27,450
- Based aircraft: 71
- Source: Federal Aviation Administration

Nome Airport (IATA: OME, ICAO: PAOM, FAA LID: OME) is a state-owned public-use airport located two nautical miles (4 km) west of the central business district of Nome, a city in the Nome Census Area of the U.S. state of Alaska.

As per Federal Aviation Administration records, the airport had 69,593 passenger boardings (enplanements) in 2022. It is included in the National Plan of Integrated Airport Systems for 2011–2015, which categorized it as a primary commercial service airport (more than 10,000 enplanements per year).

The state of Alaska also operates Nome City Field (FAA LID: 94Z), a public general aviation airfield located one nautical mile (1.85 km) north of the city.

== History ==
In World War II, the civilian Nome Airport shared use of the runway with Marks Army Airfield for transfer of Lend-Lease aircraft to the Soviet Union and in 1942, for air defense of the western coast of Alaska. Renamed Marks Air Force Base in 1948, the military installation was used as a fighter-interceptor forward base until they were pulled back to Galena Air Force Station. Marks AFB closed in 1950 and an air base squadron was at Nome Airport until December 1956.

== Facilities and aircraft ==
Nome Airport resides at elevation of 41 feet (12 m) above mean sea level. It has two runways with asphalt surfaces: Runway 10/28 is 6,009 by 150 feet (1,832 x 46 m) and Runway 3/21 is 6,176 by 150 feet (1,882 x 46 m).

For the 12-month period ending December 31, 2020, the airport had 27,450 aircraft operations, an average of 75 per day: 54% air taxi, 34% general aviation, 6% scheduled commercial, and 5% military. At that time there were 71 aircraft based at this airport: 51 single-engine, 12 multi-engine, 5 helicopter, and 3 military.

Free parking is available at the airport.

== Airlines and destinations ==
=== Passenger ===
Airlines	Destinations
Alaska Airlines	Anchorage
Bering Air	Brevig Mission, Deering, Elim, Gambell, Kotzebue, Koyuk, Savoonga, Shishmaref, St. Michael, Stebbins, Teller, Tin City, Unalakleet, Wales, White Mountain

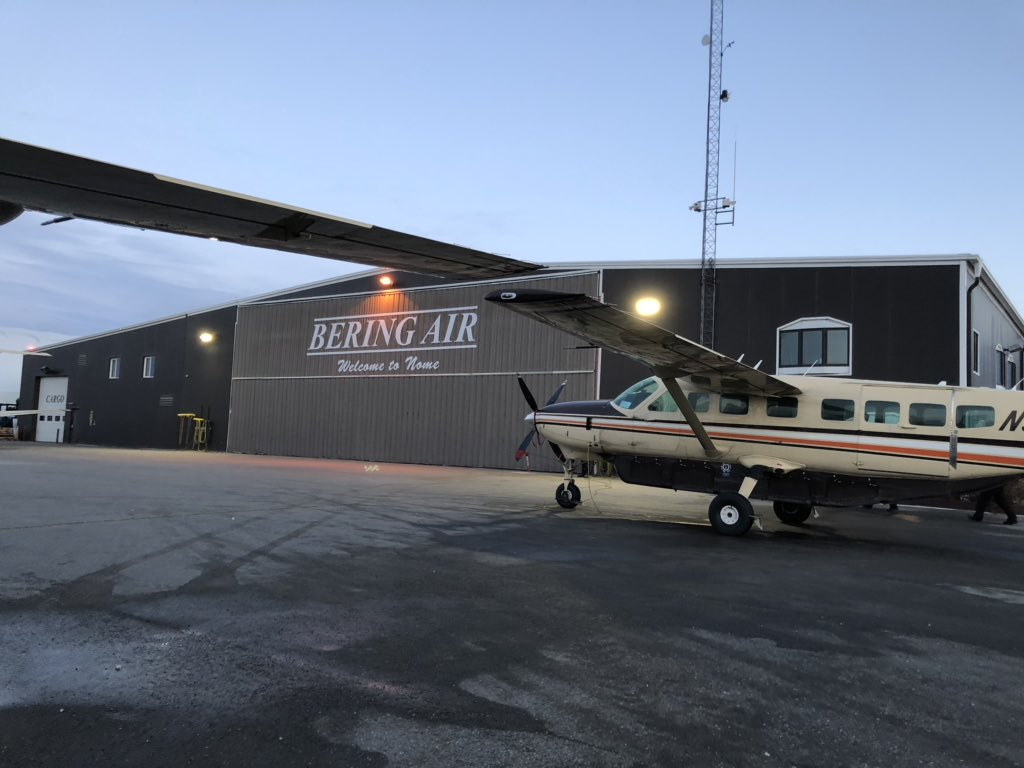
Nome Airport

== Statistics ==
Busiest Domestic Routes from OME (July 2024 – June 2025)
Rank	City	Passengers	Airline
1	Anchorage, Alaska	42,730	Alaska
2	Shishmaref, Alaska	2,830	Bering
3	Savoonga, Alaska	2,560	Bering
4	Gambell, Alaska	2,090	Bering
5	Brevig Mission, Alaska	1,790	Bering
6	Stebbins, Alaska	1,770	Bering
7	Elim, Alaska	1,600	Bering
8	Unalakleet, Alaska	1,600	Bering
9	St. Michael, Alaska	1,570	Bering
10	Koyuk, Alaska	1,480	Bering

Largest airlines at OME (July 2024 – June 2025)
Carrier	Passengers (arriving and departing)
Alaska Airlines	50,210(38.36%)
Bering Air	45,550(34.81%)
Horizon Air	35,110(26.83%)

== In popular culture ==
In Call of Duty: Modern Warfare 2, Nome Airport (referred to as "Sand Bravo" in the game) is featured as one of the targets of Russia during its invasion of the United States by "70 bogies".

== See also ==
- List of airports in Alaska
