= Koyuk Alfred Adams Airport =

- IATA: KKA; ICAO: PAKK; FAA LID: KKA

Summary
- Airport type: Public
- Owner: State of Alaska DOT&PF - Northern Region
- Serves: Koyuk, Alaska
- Elevation AMSL: 154 ft (47 m)
- Coordinates: 64°56′22″N 161°09′15″W

Map
- Location of airport in Alaska

Runways
Direction	Length		Surface
Direction	ft	m	Surface
1/19	3,000	914	Gravel
- Source: Federal Aviation Administration

Koyuk Alfred Adams Airport (IATA: KKA, ICAO: PAKK, FAA LID: KKA) is a state-owned public-use airport located in Koyuk, a city in the Nome Census Area of the U.S. state of Alaska.

== Facilities ==
Koyuk Alfred Adams Airport covers an area of 132 acres (53 ha) which contains one runway designated 1/19 with a 3,000 x 60 ft (914 x 18 m) gravel surface.

== Airlines and destinations ==
Airlines	Destinations
Bering Air	Nome, Shaktoolik, Unalakleet
Ryan Air	Unalakleet

== See also ==
- List of airports in Alaska
