= Unalakleet, Alaska =

Unalakleet Uŋalaqłiq (Inupiaq) Ungalaqliit (Central Yupik) Kk'aadoleetno' (Koyukon)
- City
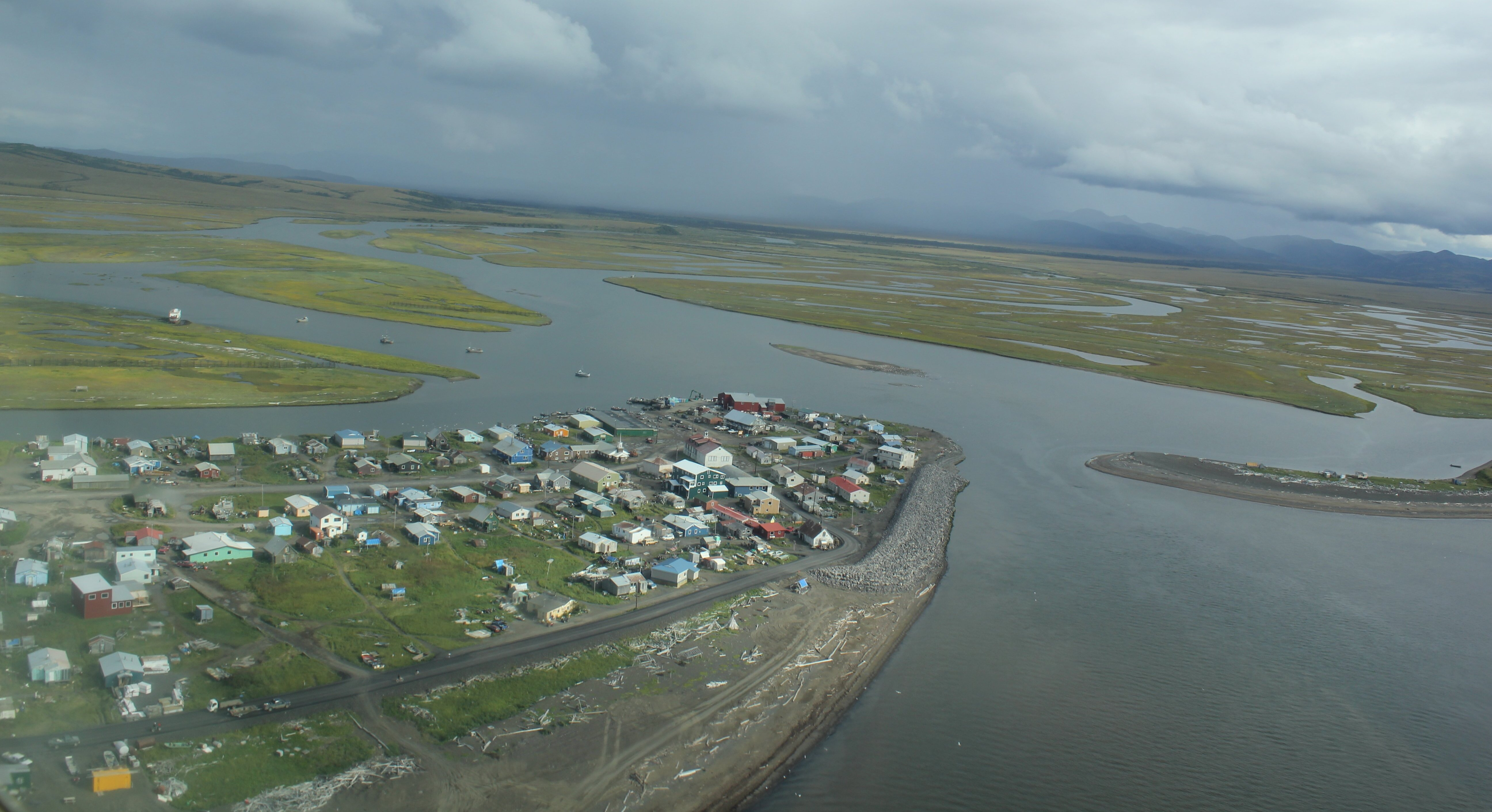
- Aerial view of Unalakleet, taken 2010

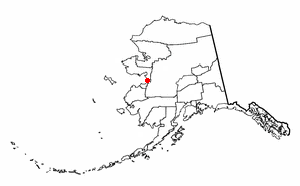
- Location of Unalakleet, Alaska
- Coordinates: 63°52′44″N 160°47′23″W
- Country: United States
- State: Alaska
- Census Area: Nome
- Incorporated: 1974

Government
  - Mayor: Abel Razzo
  - State senator: Donny Olson (D)
  - State rep.: Neal Foster (D)

Area
  - Total: 4.95 sq mi (12.81 km^{2})
  - Land: 2.86 sq mi (7.41 km^{2})
  - Water: 2.08 sq mi (5.40 km^{2})
- Elevation: 6.6 ft (2 m)

Population (2020)
  - Total: 765
  - Density: 267/sq mi (103.2/km^{2})
- Time zone: UTC-9 (Alaska (AKST))
  - Summer (DST): UTC-8 (AKDT)
- ZIP code: 99684
- Area code: 907
- FIPS code: 02-80660
- GNIS feature ID: 1411517

Unalakleet (/ˈjuːnələkliːt/ YOO-nə-lə-kleet; Inupiaq: Uŋalaqłiq, IPA: [uŋɐlɑχɬeq] or Uŋalaqłiit; Yup'ik: Ungalaqliit; Koyukon: Kk'aadoleetno’) is a town in Nome Census Area, Alaska, United States, in the western part of the state. As of the 2020 census, Unalakleet had a population of 765. Unalakleet is known in the region and around Alaska for its salmon and king crab harvests; the residents rely for much of their diet on caribou, ptarmigan, oogruk (bearded seal), and various salmon species.

Unalakleet is also known for its aesthetic value. It is located next to the Bering Sea and the large, clean Unalakleet River. The landscape also has trees, tundra, and hills behind it.

== History ==
Unalakleet is an adaptation of the Iñupiaq word "Una-la-thliq", which means "from the southern side".

Unalakleet is located at the Norton Sound end of the Unalakleet-Kaltag Portage, an important winter travel route between Norton Sound and the Yukon River. Unalakleet has long been a major trade center between the Athabascan people, who lived in the interior of Alaska, and the Inupiat, who lived on the coast.

In the 1830s Russian explorers and traders came: The Russian-American Company built a trading post here at Unalakleet. In 1898 the United States arranged for Sami reindeer herders from Lapland to be brought to Unalakleet, to work with the people about herding practices. In 1901, the United States Army Signal Corps built a 605-mile (974 km) telegraph line from St. Michael that passed through Unalakleet.

== Geography and climate ==
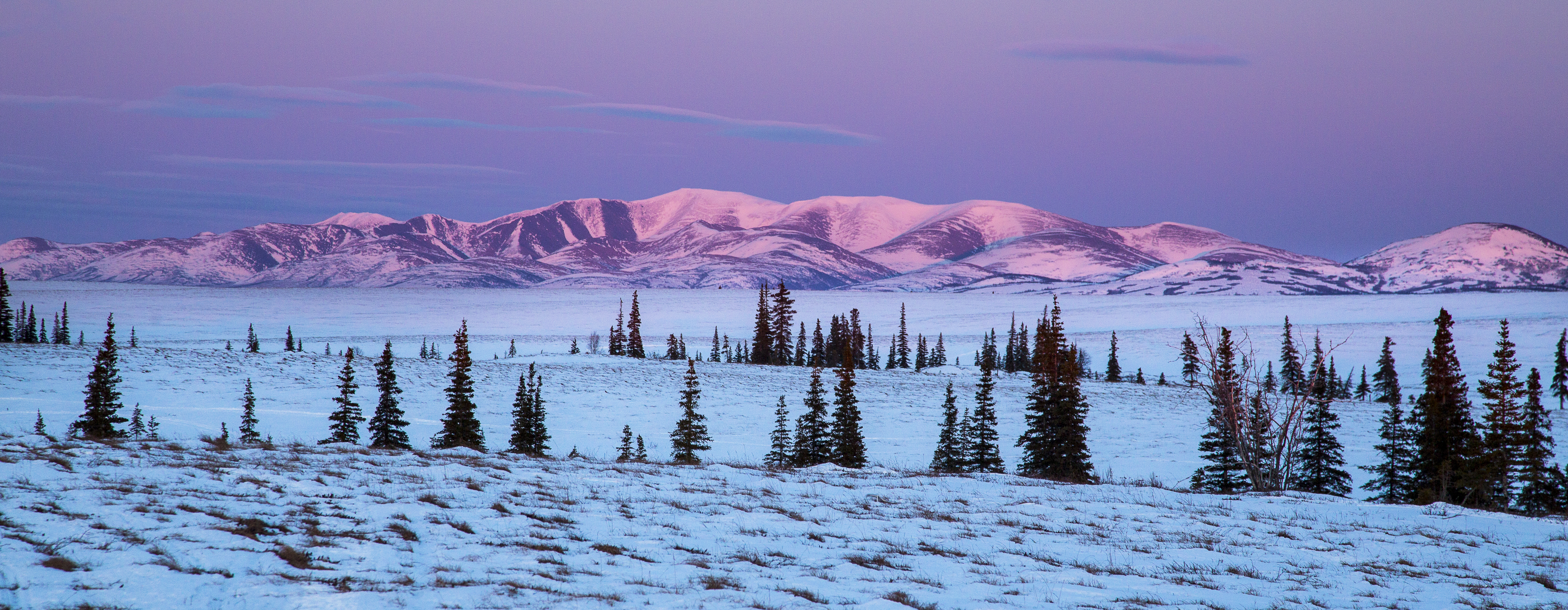
Images taken near Unalakleet show very few trees, reflecting the subarctic and polar boundaries.

Unalakleet is located at 63°52′44″N 160°47′23″W (63.878907, −160.789680).

Unalakleet is located on the Norton Sound of the Bering Sea at the mouth of the Unalakleet River, 148 miles (238 km) southeast of Nome and 395 miles (636 km) northwest of Anchorage. Unalakleet has a subarctic climate (Koppen: Dfc) with considerable maritime influences. Winters are cold and dry. Average summer temperatures range 47 to 62 °F (8 to 17 °C); winter temperatures range from −40 to 11 °F (−40 to −12 °C). Precipitation averages 14 inches (360 mm) annually, with 41 inches (100 cm) of snow.

According to the United States Census Bureau, the city has a total area of 5.1 square miles (13 km^{2}), of which, 2.9 square miles (7.5 km^{2}) of it is land and 2.3 square miles (6.0 km^{2}) of it (44.25%) is water.

Climate data for Unalakleet (1961–1990 normals, extremes 1941–1998)
| Month | Jan | Feb | Mar | Apr | May | Jun | Jul | Aug | Sep | Oct | Nov | Dec | Year |
|---|---|---|---|---|---|---|---|---|---|---|---|---|---|
| Record high °F (°C) | 47 (8) | 46 (8) | 47 (8) | 62 (17) | 78 (26) | 86 (30) | 87 (31) | 85 (29) | 75 (24) | 60 (16) | 48 (9) | 43 (6) | 87 (31) |
| Mean maximum °F (°C) | 34.5 (1.4) | 31.8 (−0.1) | 36.5 (2.5) | 45.5 (7.5) | 63.0 (17.2) | 69.0 (20.6) | 75.2 (24.0) | 72.9 (22.7) | 64.0 (17.8) | 47.2 (8.4) | 36.2 (2.3) | 35.2 (1.8) | 77.8 (25.4) |
| Mean daily maximum °F (°C) | 11.0 (−11.7) | 11.0 (−11.7) | 18.9 (−7.3) | 29.5 (−1.4) | 45.6 (7.6) | 54.2 (12.3) | 61.2 (16.2) | 59.9 (15.5) | 51.4 (10.8) | 33.0 (0.6) | 19.4 (−7.0) | 12.2 (−11.0) | 33.9 (1.1) |
| Daily mean °F (°C) | 4.9 (−15.1) | 3.3 (−15.9) | 10.9 (−11.7) | 21.3 (−5.9) | 38.4 (3.6) | 47.9 (8.8) | 54.8 (12.7) | 53.1 (11.7) | 44.2 (6.8) | 27.0 (−2.8) | 13.5 (−10.3) | 5.7 (−14.6) | 27.1 (−2.7) |
| Mean daily minimum °F (°C) | −1.3 (−18.5) | −4.4 (−20.2) | 2.9 (−16.2) | 13.2 (−10.4) | 31.1 (−0.5) | 41.4 (5.2) | 48.5 (9.2) | 46.3 (7.9) | 37.0 (2.8) | 21.0 (−6.1) | 7.5 (−13.6) | −0.8 (−18.2) | 20.2 (−6.6) |
| Mean minimum °F (°C) | −30.1 (−34.5) | −32.5 (−35.8) | −25.0 (−31.7) | −10.6 (−23.7) | 16.6 (−8.6) | 31.9 (−0.1) | 39.0 (3.9) | 35.3 (1.8) | 24.1 (−4.4) | 0.9 (−17.3) | −16.3 (−26.8) | −29.9 (−34.4) | −40.8 (−40.4) |
| Record low °F (°C) | −59 (−51) | −50 (−46) | −50 (−46) | −32 (−36) | −11 (−24) | 25 (−4) | 32 (0) | 28 (−2) | 6 (−14) | −20 (−29) | −47 (−44) | −52 (−47) | −59 (−51) |
| Average precipitation inches (mm) | 0.69 (18) | 0.51 (13) | 0.70 (18) | 0.63 (16) | 0.87 (22) | 1.35 (34) | 2.28 (58) | 3.04 (77) | 2.28 (58) | 1.24 (31) | 1.09 (28) | 0.91 (23) | 15.59 (396) |
| Average snowfall inches (cm) | 4.5 (11) | 3.6 (9.1) | 5.3 (13) | 3.6 (9.1) | 1.5 (3.8) | 0.0 (0.0) | 0.0 (0.0) | 0.0 (0.0) | 0.2 (0.51) | 3.0 (7.6) | 6.4 (16) | 5.4 (14) | 33.5 (85) |
| Average precipitation days (≥ 0.01 inch) | 7.6 | 6.6 | 8.5 | 7.8 | 7.7 | 10.2 | 13.5 | 15.9 | 13.4 | 10.7 | 10.0 | 9.3 | 121.2 |
| Average snowy days (≥ 0.01 inch) | 6.8 | 5.8 | 7.5 | 6.0 | 1.8 | 0.0 | 0.0 | 0.0 | 0.2 | 5.5 | 8.6 | 8.3 | 50.5 |
Source 1: WRCC
Source 2: XMACIS (snowfall)

== Demographics ==
Historical population
| Census | Pop. | Note | %± |
|---|---|---|---|
| 1880 | 100 | | — |
| 1890 | 175 | | 75.0% |
| 1900 | 241 | | 37.7% |
| 1910 | 247 | | 2.5% |
| 1920 | 285 | | 15.4% |
| 1930 | 261 | | −8.4% |
| 1940 | 329 | | 26.1% |
| 1950 | 469 | | 42.6% |
| 1960 | 574 | | 22.4% |
| 1970 | 434 | | −24.4% |
| 1980 | 623 | | 43.5% |
| 1990 | 714 | | 14.6% |
| 2000 | 747 | | 4.6% |
| 2010 | 688 | | −7.9% |
| 2020 | 765 | | 11.2% |
U.S. Decennial Census

Unalakleet first appeared on the 1880 U.S. Census as the unincorporated Inuit village of "Oonalakleet." All 100 of its residents were listed as Inuit. It was listed in the 1890 census as "Unalaklik." Of its 175 residents, 170 were Native, 3 were Creole (mixed Russian & Native), and 2 were White. It was listed again as Unalaklik in 1900 and in 1910 under that name, although the latter census also listed it as spelled Unalakleet. Since 1920, it has been recorded in the censuses as Unalakleet. It was formally incorporated in 1974.

=== Racial and ethnic composition ===
Unalakleet city, Alaska – Racial and ethnic composition Note: the US Census treats Hispanic/Latino as an ethnic category. This table excludes Latinos from the racial categories and assigns them to a separate category. Hispanics/Latinos may be of any race.
| Race / Ethnicity (NH = Non-Hispanic) | Pop 2000 | Pop 2010 | Pop 2020 | % 2000 | % 2010 | % 2020 |
|---|---|---|---|---|---|---|
| White alone (NH) | 88 | 98 | 111 | 11.78% | 14.24% | 14.51% |
| Black or African American alone (NH) | 2 | 4 | 1 | 0.27% | 0.58% | 0.13% |
| Native American or Alaska Native alone (NH) | 636 | 531 | 636 | 85.14% | 77.18% | 83.14% |
| Asian alone (NH) | 0 | 4 | 2 | 0.00% | 0.58% | 0.26% |
| Native Hawaiian or Pacific Islander alone (NH) | 0 | 0 | 0 | 0.00% | 0.00% | 0.00% |
| Other race alone (NH) | 0 | 0 | 0 | 0.00% | 0.00% | 0.00% |
| Mixed race or Multiracial (NH) | 19 | 44 | 8 | 2.54% | 6.40% | 1.05% |
| Hispanic or Latino (any race) | 2 | 7 | 7 | 0.27% | 1.02% | 0.92% |
| Total | 747 | 688 | 765 | 100.00% | 100.00% | 100.00% |

=== 2020 census ===
As of the 2020 census, Unalakleet had a population of 765. The median age was 33.3 years. 32.9% of residents were under the age of 18 and 10.3% of residents were 65 years of age or older. For every 100 females there were 107.9 males, and for every 100 females age 18 and over there were 100.4 males age 18 and over.

0.0% of residents lived in urban areas, while 100.0% lived in rural areas.

There were 242 households in Unalakleet, of which 44.2% had children under the age of 18 living in them. Of all households, 44.2% were married-couple households, 20.2% were households with a male householder and no spouse or partner present, and 26.0% were households with a female householder and no spouse or partner present. About 24.8% of all households were made up of individuals and 7.9% had someone living alone who was 65 years of age or older.

There were 309 housing units, of which 21.7% were vacant. The homeowner vacancy rate was 0.7% and the rental vacancy rate was 1.8%.

Racial composition as of the 2020 census
| Race | Number | Percent |
|---|---|---|
| White | 111 | 14.5% |
| Black or African American | 1 | 0.1% |
| American Indian and Alaska Native | 637 | 83.3% |
| Asian | 2 | 0.3% |
| Native Hawaiian and Other Pacific Islander | 0 | 0.0% |
| Some other race | 4 | 0.5% |
| Two or more races | 10 | 1.3% |
| Hispanic or Latino (of any race) | 7 | 0.9% |

=== 2010 census ===
As of the census of 2010, there were 688 people, 225 households, and 172 families residing in the city. The population density was 237.2 inhabitants per square mile (91.6/km^{2}). There were 268 housing units at an average density of 92.4 per square mile (35.7/km^{2}). The racial makeup of the city was 15.0% White, 0.6% Black or African American, 77.3% Native American, 0.1% from other races, and 6.4% from two or more races. 1.0% of the population were Hispanic or Latino of any race.

There were 224 households, out of which 46.9% had children under the age of 18 living with them, 47.3% were married couples living together, 21.4% had a female householder with no husband present, and 21.9% were non-families. 18.8% of all households were made up of individuals, and 5.4% had someone living alone who was 65 years of age or older. The average household size was 3.33 and the average family size was 3.82.

The population was spread out, with 37.5% under the age of 18, 6.2% from 18 to 24, 26.6% from 25 to 44, 21.6% from 45 to 64, and 8.2% who were 65 years of age or older. The median age was 31 years. For every 100 females, there were 114.7 males. For every 100 females age 18 and over, there were 124.5 males.

The median income for a household in the city was $42,083, and the median income for a family was $45,625. Males had a median income of $41,964 versus $32,500 for females. The per capita income for the city was $15,845. About 12.5% of families and 11.0% of the population were below the poverty line, including 11.3% of those under age 18 and 10.0% of those age 65 or over.

== Role in mushing races ==
Unalakleet is the first checkpoint on the Norton Sound in the famous Iditarod Trail Sled Dog Race, some 851 miles (1,370 km) from the start in Anchorage. The first musher to reach this checkpoint each year is awarded the Gold Coast Award, which includes $2,500 in gold nuggets. Unalakleet also plays an important role in the Iron Dog snowmobile race.

== Education ==
The Mission Covenant Church of Sweden established a mission in Unalakleet in 1887. The Evangelical Covenant Church later started a boarding high school in 1954. It served students from all over western Alaska until it closed in 1985 due to changing educational practices following establishment of home rule in the 1970s. Most villages in Alaska established local schools, including high schools.

The district office for the Bering Strait School District has been located in Unalakleet since 1983. Serving fifteen village schools, the Bering Strait School District covers territory of approximately 75,000 square miles (190,000 km^{2}).

Unalakleet's local schools include Unalakleet School, a K-12 school that is internally divided into Unalakleet Elementary, Unalakleet Middle School, and Unalakleet High School. The combined school population of Unalakleet Schools is 195, 180 of whom are full or part Alaska Native.

== Athletics ==
Unalakleet High School maintains an active and successful athletics program, offering student participation in basketball, mix-six volleyball, wrestling, cross-country running, cross-country skiing/biathlon, track and field, and Native Youth Olympics.

Despite its classification as a 1A-sized institution (fewer than 60 students), Unalakleet has long competed at the 2A level (60–150 students) in basketball. Since 1991, no school has qualified for the Alaska 2A state basketball tournament more frequently than Unalakleet. The boys’ basketball program has secured a total of seven state championships, with three attributed to Covenant High. The most recent title came in 2025. Unalakleet has had three Alaska 2A Player of the Year in boys’ basketball: Kevin Ivanoff (1992), Aidan Ivanoff (2019), and Paxson Commack (2025).

In volleyball, Unalakleet High School has won two state championships in the mix-six division. The school has also achieved success in individual sports. In track and field, Ourea Busk captured consecutive state titles in the 400-meter dash in 2023 and 2024, and also won back-to-back Division III state championships in cross-country running in those same years. In wrestling, Jack Koutchak III earned a state championship in the 103-pound weight class in 1999.

== Transportation and law ==
Unalakleet Airport is a central hub for outlying villages, providing air cargo and air taxi services. It is served by frequent cargo services by Everts Air Cargo and Northern Air Cargo. Daily flights to Nome and outlying villages are made by Bering Air and Ryan Air.

Unalakleet has an Alaska State Troopers station. Its local police department works with local VPOs and VPSOs. A court system serves Unalakleet and surrounding villages.

== Healthcare ==
Unalakleet health services are provided by the Anikkan Inuit Iluaqutaat Sub-Regional Clinic, a division of Norton Sound Health Corporation, based in Nome, Alaska. The clinic has permanent staff including medical providers, certified health aides, behavioral health specialists, and a pharmacist. It also hosts specialists in other fields regularly throughout the year.

== Notable people ==
- William E. Beltz (1912–1960), carpenter, politician, lived in Unalakleet
- Ticasuk Brown (1904–1982), educator, writer; born and raised in Unalakleet
