= Teller Airport =

- IATA: TLA; ICAO: PATE; FAA LID: TER

Summary
- Airport type: Public
- Owner: State of Alaska DOT & PF - Northern Region
- Serves: Teller, Alaska
- Elevation AMSL: 294 ft / 90 m
- Coordinates: 65°14′25″N 166°20′22″W

Map
- Location of airport in Alaska

Runways
Direction	Length		Surface
Direction	ft	m	Surface
7/25	3,000	914	Gravel
- Source: Federal Aviation Administration

Teller Airport (IATA: TLA, ICAO: PATE, FAA LID: TER, formerly K54) is a state-owned public-use airport located two nautical miles (4 km) south of the central business district of Teller, a city in the Nome Census Area of the U.S. state of Alaska.

== Facilities and aircraft ==
Teller Airport has one runway designated 07/25 with a 3,000 x 60 ft (914 x 18 m) gravel surface.

== Airlines and destinations ==
Airlines	Destinations
Bering Air	Brevig Mission, Nome, Wales

== See also ==
- List of airports in Alaska
