= Pectate disaccharide-lyase =

pectate disaccharide-lyase

Identifiers
- EC no.: 4.2.2.9
- CAS no.: 37290-87-2

Databases
- IntEnz: IntEnz view
- BRENDA: BRENDA entry
- ExPASy: NiceZyme view
- KEGG: KEGG entry
- MetaCyc: metabolic pathway
- PRIAM: profile
- PDB structures: RCSB PDB PDBe PDBsum
- Gene Ontology: AmiGO / QuickGO
Search
- PMC: articles
- PubMed: articles
- NCBI: proteins

The enzyme pectate disaccharide-lyase (EC 4.2.2.9) catalyzes the following process:

(1,4-α-D-galacturonosyl)_{n} = (1,4-α-D-galacturonosyl)_{n–2} + 4-(4-deoxy-α-D-galact-4-enuronosyl)-D-galacturonate

This enzyme belongs to the family of lyases, specifically those carbon-oxygen lyases acting on polysaccharides. The systematic name of this enzyme class is (1→4)-alpha-D-galacturonan reducing-end-disaccharide-lyase. Other names in common use include pectate exo-lyase, exopectic acid transeliminase, exopectate lyase, exopolygalacturonic acid-trans-eliminase, PATE, exo-PATE, and exo-PGL.
