= Shishmaref Airport =

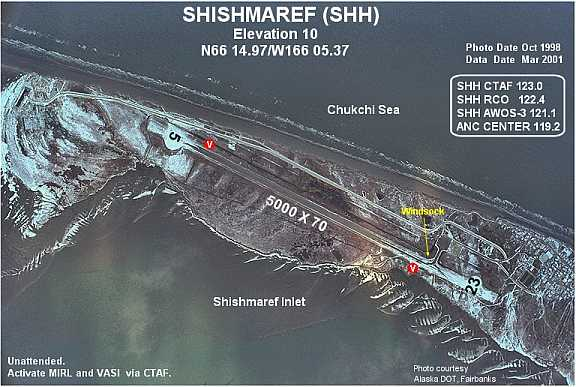
- IATA: SHH; ICAO: PASH; FAA LID: SHH

Summary
- Airport type: Public
- Owner: Alaska DOT&PF - Northern Region
- Serves: Shishmaref, Alaska
- Elevation AMSL: 12 ft / 4 m
- Coordinates: 66°14′58″N 166°05′25″W

Map
- Location of airport in Alaska

Runways
Direction	Length		Surface
Direction	ft	m	Surface
5/23	5,000	1,524	Asphalt
- Source: Federal Aviation Administration

Shishmaref Airport (IATA: SHH, ICAO: PASH, FAA LID: SHH) (Inupiaq: Qigiqtam Mizrvia) is a state-owned public-use airport located one nautical mile (1.85 km) south of the central business district of Shishmaref, a village in the Nome Census Area of the U.S. state of Alaska. It has one asphalt paved runway designated 5/23 and measuring 5,000 x 70 ft. (1,524 x 21 m). Shishmaref is located on Sarichef Island in the Chukchi Sea, just north of the Bering Strait and five miles from the mainland.

As per Federal Aviation Administration records, the airport had 5,040 commercial passenger boardings (enplanements) in calendar year 2006 and 4,732 enplanements in 2007. According to the FAA's National Plan of Integrated Airport Systems (NPIAS), it is classified as commercial service - non-primary because it has between 2,500 and 10,000 passenger boardings per year.

== Former airport ==
The old airport was located just east on the edge of town with a north-south runway. Housing now occupies much of the old runway with only the south end and north part north of Housing Trail of the former runway visible (marked X).

== Airlines and destinations ==
Airlines	Destinations
Bering Air	Nome, Wales

== See also ==
- List of airports in Alaska
