= White Mountain Airport =

Airport in Alaska, United States

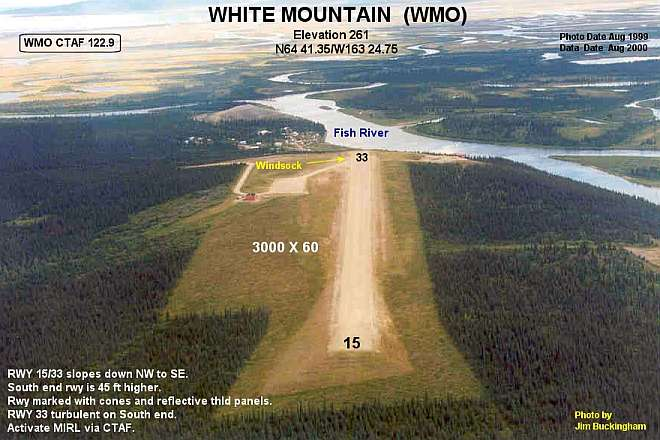
- IATA: WMO; ICAO: PAWM; FAA LID: WMO

Summary
- Airport type: Public
- Owner: State of Alaska DOT&PF - Northern Region
- Serves: White Mountain, Alaska
- Elevation AMSL: 267 ft (81 m)
- Coordinates: 64°41′21″N 163°24′46″W

Map
- Location of airport in Alaska

Runways
Direction	Length		Surface
Direction	ft	m	Surface
15/33	3,000	914	Gravel

Statistics
- Enplanements (2007): 2,516
- Source: Federal Aviation Administration

White Mountain Airport (IATA: WMO, ICAO: PAWM, FAA LID: WMO) is a state-owned public-use airport located one nautical mile (1.85 km) north of the central business district of White Mountain, a city in the Nome Census Area of the U.S. state of Alaska.

As per Federal Aviation Administration records, this airport had 2,516 passenger boardings (enplanements) in calendar year 2007, a decrease of 11% from the 2,821 enplanements in 2006.

== Facilities ==
White Mountain Airport covers an area of 82 acres (33 ha) at an elevation of 267 feet (81 m) above mean sea level. It has one runway designated 15/33 with a 3,000 x 60 ft (914 x 18 m) gravel surface.

== Airlines and destinations ==
Airlines	Destinations
Bering Air	Golovin, Nome

== See also ==
- List of airports in Alaska
