= Unalakleet Airport =

Airport in Unalakleet, Alaska, U.S.

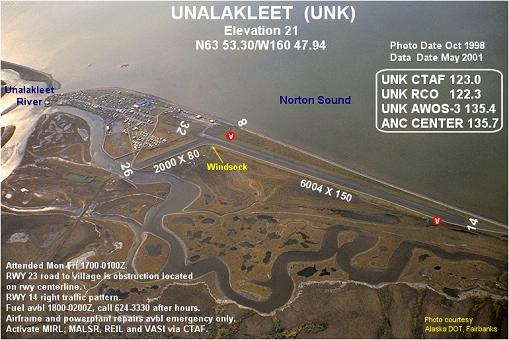
- IATA: UNK; ICAO: PAUN; FAA LID: UNK

Summary
- Airport type: Public
- Owner: State of Alaska DOT&PF
- Serves: Unalakleet, Alaska
- Elevation AMSL: 21 ft (6.4 m)
- Coordinates: 63°53′18″N 160°47′56″W

Map
- Location within Alaska

Runways
Direction	Length		Surface
Direction	ft	m	Surface
15/33	5,900	1,798	Asphalt
9/27	1,900	579	Asphalt
- Source: Federal Aviation Administration

Unalakleet Airport (IATA: UNK, ICAO: PAUN, FAA LID: UNK) is a state-owned public-use airport located one nautical mile (2 km) north of the central business district of Unalakleet, a city in the Nome Census Area of the U.S. state of Alaska.

== Facilities and aircraft ==
Unalakleet Airport covers an area of 715 acres (289 ha) at an elevation of 27 feet (8 m) above mean sea level. It has two asphalt surfaced runways: 15/33 measuring 5,900 x 150 ft (1,798 x 46 m) and 9/27 measuring 1,900 x 75 ft (579 x 23 m).

Northern Air Cargo flies the largest airplanes to this location, with Boeing 737 service.

== Airlines and destinations ==
=== Passenger ===
Airlines	Destinations
Aleutian Airways	Anchorage
Bering Air	Koyuk, Nome, St. Michael, Shaktoolik, Stebbins
Ryan Air	Koyuk, St. Michael, Shaktoolik, Stebbins

=== Cargo ===
Airlines	Destinations
Northern Air Cargo	Anchorage
Everts Air Cargo	Anchorage

== Accidents and incidents ==
- A Boeing 737-2x6X, operating as MarkAir Flight 3087 from Anchorage, crashed 7.5 miles short of runway 14 on June 2, 1990, injuring four, one of them (a flight attendant) seriously. There were no passengers in the aircraft, which was destroyed. No one was killed in the incident.

== See also ==
- List of airports in Alaska
