= York Plateau =

Plateau on Seward Peninsula, Alaska, USA

Coordinates: 65°32′N 167°35′W

York Plateau is located on the Seward Peninsula of the U.S. state of Alaska. It is situated beyond the western front of the York Mountains. It is a dissected plateau which stands at an elevation of about 600 feet (180 m). The top of the plateau is smooth and hard. The larger streams within the plateau have rather broad valleys, which are cut down nearly to sea level, while the smaller tributaries flow in canyons. To the south, the plateau ends in a steep escarpment which is separated from the Bering Sea by a narrow coastal plain or beach. Near the settlement of York, the coastal plain has an elevation of about 50 feet (15 m), and above this is a higher bench at about 400 feet (120 m), which is similar to the plateau in character, but not so extensive. The plateau seems to slope more gradually to the Arctic Ocean, from which it is separated by a coastal plain which extends inland for several miles. A wide lagoon separates this coastal plain from the Arctic Ocean. The surface of the plateau is covered with a thin layer of semiangular gravels.
