= Wales Airport (Alaska) =

Airport in Alaska, United States

- IATA: WAA; ICAO: PAIW; FAA LID: IWK; WMO: 70116

Summary
- Airport type: Public
- Owner: State of Alaska DOT & PF - Northern Region
- Serves: Wales, Alaska
- Elevation AMSL: 22 ft (6.7 m)
- Coordinates: 65°37′21″N 168°05′42″W

Map
- Location of airport in Alaska

Runways
Direction	Length		Surface
Direction	ft	m	Surface
18/36	4,000	1,219	Gravel
- Source: Federal Aviation Administration

Wales Airport (IATA: WAA, ICAO: PAIW, FAA LID: IWK) is a state-owned public-use airport located one nautical mile (2 km) northwest of the central business district of Wales, a city in the Nome Census Area of the U.S. state of Alaska.

== Facilities ==
Wales airport has one runway designated 18/36 with a 3,990 x 75 ft (1,216 x 23 m) gravel surface.

== Airlines and destinations ==
Airlines	Destinations
Bering Air	Nome, Shishmaref
Ryan Air	Brevig Mission, Shishmaref

== See also ==
- List of airports in Alaska
