= Shishmaref, Alaska =

Shishmaref Qigiqtaq (Inupiaq) Шишмарёв (Russian)
- City
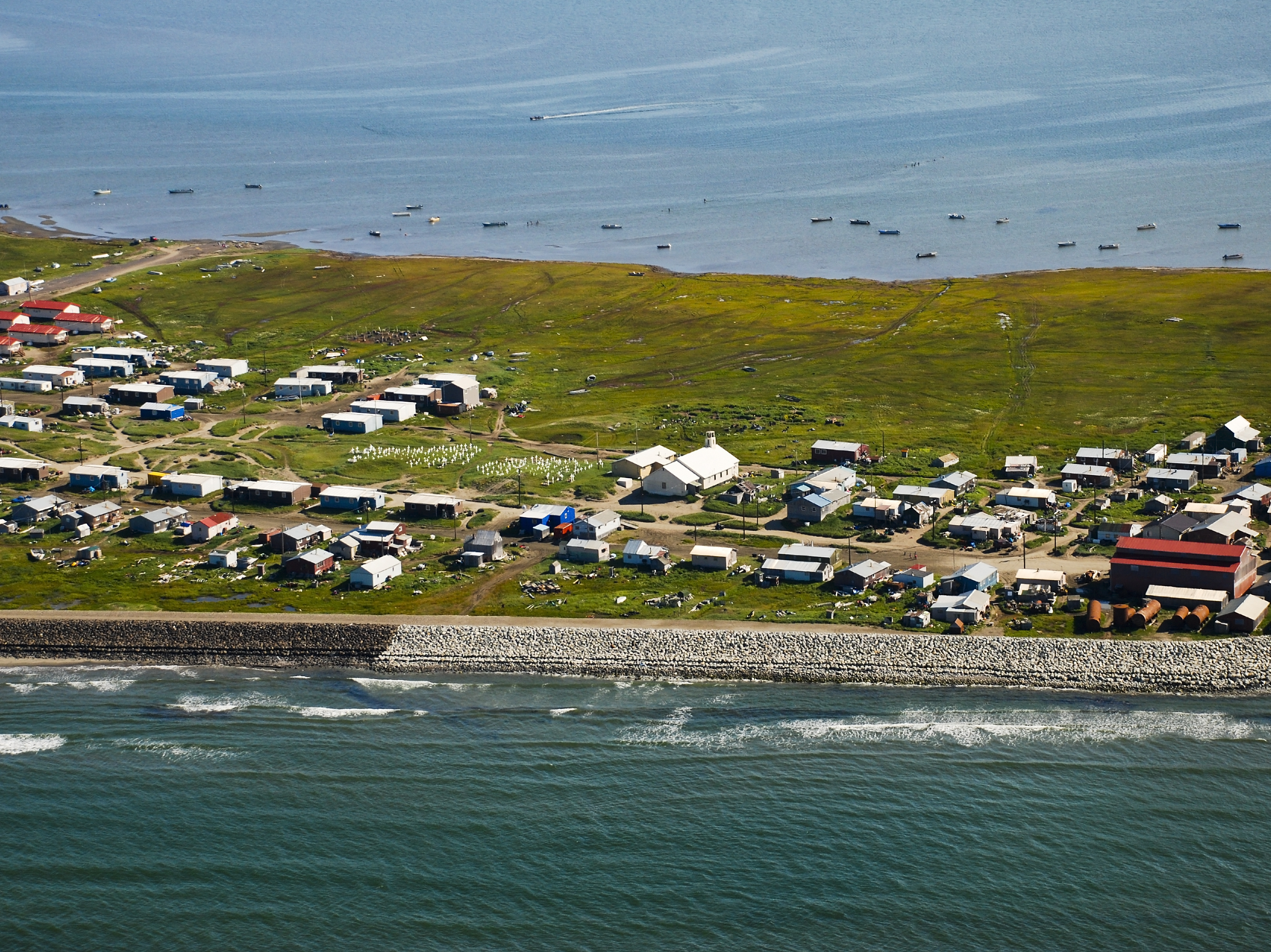
- Aerial view of Shishmaref

- Location in Alaska
- Coordinates: 66°15′20″N 166°04′20″W
- Country: United States
- State: Alaska
- Census Area: Nome
- Incorporated: July 13, 1969

Government
  - Mayor: Donna Barr
  - State senator: Donald Olson (D)
  - State rep.: Neal Foster (D)

Area
  - Total: 7.27 sq mi (18.82 km^{2})
  - Land: 2.34 sq mi (6.06 km^{2})
  - Water: 4.93 sq mi (12.76 km^{2})
- Elevation: 16 ft (5 m)

Population (2020)
  - Total: 576
  - Density: 246.3/sq mi (95.08/km^{2})
- Time zone: UTC-9 (Alaska (AKST))
  - Summer (DST): UTC-8 (AKDT)
- ZIP code: 99772
- Area code: 907
- FIPS code: 02-69770
- GNIS feature ID: 1409434, 2418855

Shishmaref (/ˈʃɪʃmərɛf/ SHISH-mə-ref; Inupiaq: Qigiqtaq, IPA: [qixiqtaq] or Kigiqtaq; Russian: Шишмарёв, IPA: [ʂɨʂmɐˈrʲɵf]) is a city in the Nome Census Area, Alaska, United States. It is located on Sarichef Island in the Chukchi Sea, just north of the Bering Strait and five miles from the mainland. Shishmaref lies within the Bering Land Bridge National Preserve. As of the 2020 census, Shishmaref had a population of 576.

== Etymology ==
Shishmaryov is probably a variant of Russian Shyshmánov from Turkic šyšman ‘fat’, but there is also Old Russian šiš ‘rogue, knave’ and Maréev ‘(son of) marine’. The name was assigned in 1821 to a nearby inlet by explorer Otto von Kotzebue of the Russian Imperial Marine, in honor of a member of his expedition, the commander Gleb S. Shishmaryov (Глеб Семёнович Шишмарёв).

In the Iñupiaq language, Qigiqtaq (formally Ḳigiḳtaḳ) means ‘island’. The water to the south of it is called Qigiqtam Imaġrua ‘waters of Qikiqtaq’, shown in the map of the area in the Bering Land Bridge National Preserve.

== Geography ==
According to the United States Census Bureau, the city has a total area of 7.3 square miles (19 km^{2}), of which, 2.8 square miles (7.3 km^{2}) of it is land and 4.5 square miles (12 km^{2}) of it (61.62%) is water.

Shishmaref was named in 1821 by explorer Lt. Otto von Kotzebue, of the Imperial Russian Navy, after Capt. Lt. Gleb Shishmaryov who accompanied him on his exploration.

Sarichef Island (on which Shishmaref is located) is part of a dynamic, 100 km-long barrier island chain that records human and environmental history spanning the past 2000 years; the oldest subaerial evidence for the formation of this system is about 1700 years before present, according to carbon 14 dating (see References, below). Erosion at Shishmaref is unique along the islands because of its fetch exposure and high tidal prism, relatively intense infrastructure development during the 20th century, and multiple shoreline defense structures built beginning in the 1970s.

=== Global warming ===
The effect of global climate change upon Shishmaref is sometimes seen as the most dramatic in the world. Rising temperatures have resulted in a reduction in the sea ice which serves to buffer Shishmaref from storm surges. At the same time, the permafrost that the village is built on has also begun to melt, making the shore even more vulnerable to erosion. In recent years the shore has been receding at an average rate of up to 10 feet (3.3 m) per year. Although a series of barricades has been put up to protect the village, the shore has continued to erode at an alarming rate. The Army Corps of Engineers has built a series of walls but none have been completely effective against waves. The town's homes, water system and infrastructure are being undermined. Currently, Shishmaref has obtained funds to construct seawalls that protect some of the shoreline.

The village had plans to relocate several miles to the south, on the mainland to the Tin Creek site. However, Tin Creek proved unsuitable for long term settlement due to melting permafrost in the area. The Shishmaref Erosion and Relocation Coalition, made up of the city, the IRA Council and other organizations, is seeking federal, state and private funding for a move elsewhere. The cost of moving Shishmaref is estimated at $180 million, nearly $320,000 per resident. The village was told by the Obama administration that no federal money was available. Tensions arose in 2013 when John Kerry announced Vietnam would receive $17 million to deal with climate change.

Erosion rates along the island front exceed (and are not comparable with) those along adjacent sectors. Erosion is occurring along the entire island chain, but it is exacerbated at Sarichef Island in part because of the hydrographic impacts of hard armoring of a sandy shoreface and permafrost degradation that is accelerated by infrastructure. Residents are experiencing the effects of coastal retreat on residential and commercial properties.

Residents voted on town relocation several times, as early as 1975 and then in 2002 which approved it. On August 16, 2016, the village voted to move the town to the mainland. The town's residents prefer to think of the move to the mainland as an "expansion" rather than a "relocation", but although a site on the mainland called West Tin-Creek Hills was selected in 2016, there’s still a lot of planning and research to be done before that can be determined viable.

== Culture ==
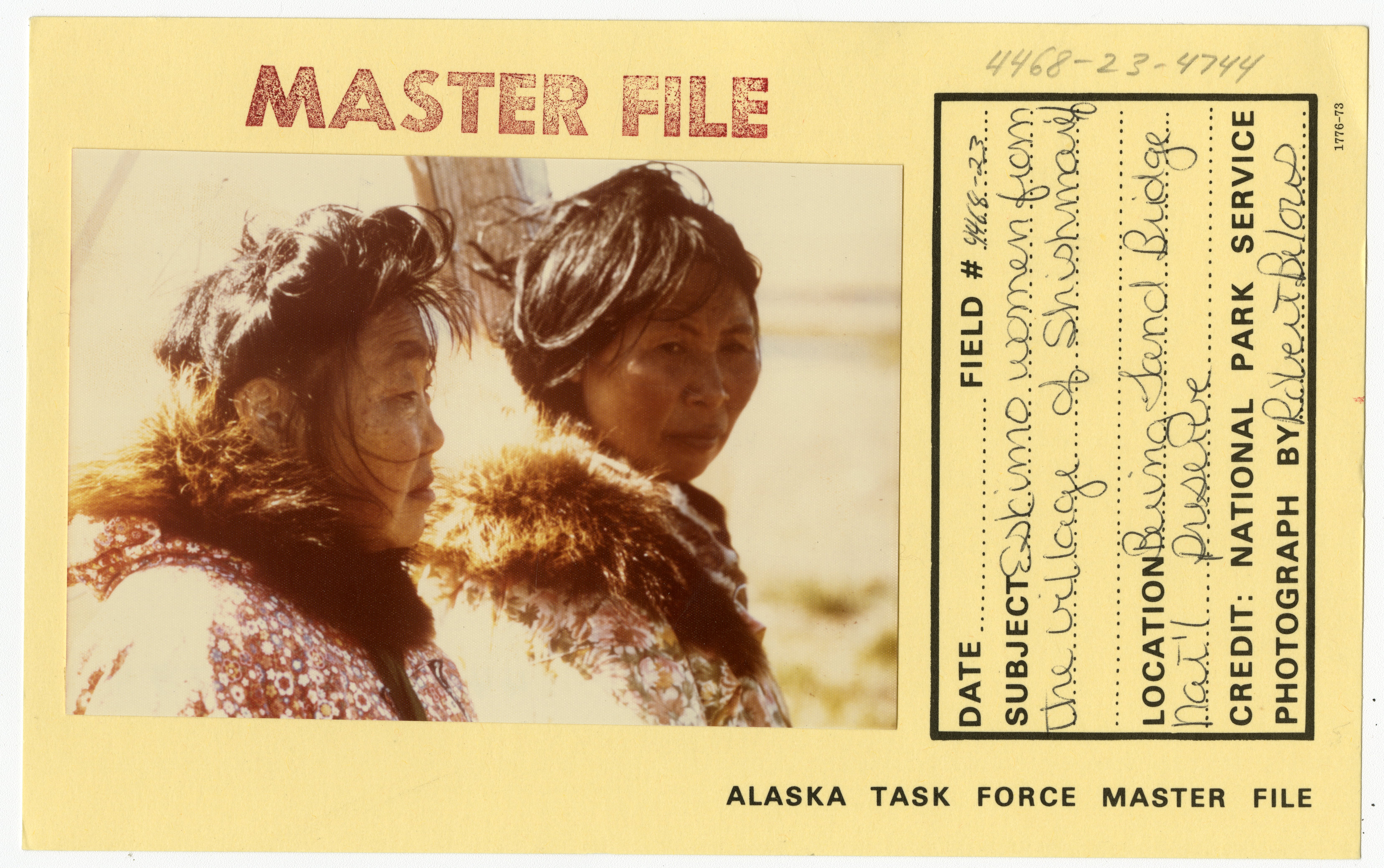
Women from the village of Shishmaref, c. 1970s

Sometimes referred to as "the friendliest village in Alaska," Shishmaref is an Iñupiaq village. Researchers, journalists and the occasional tourist visit Shishmaref, and the city has acquired a reputation for being a gracious host.

Residents rely heavily on a subsistence lifestyle, that is, hunting and gathering much of their food. Primary food sources include sea mammals such as ugruk (bearded seal), other seals, and walrus, fish, birds (such as ptarmigan), caribou and moose. The village is well known in the region for its high-quality seal oil and fermented meat. Shishmaref is known for its Native art. Local artists carve sculptures from whalebone and walrus ivory, which are much sought after by galleries in Alaska and the Lower 48 states. George Aden Ahgupuk (1911–2001), a prominent Iñupiaq sculptor and draftsman, lived in Shishmaref.

Shishmaref was home to one of Alaska's most-beloved dog mushers. Herbie Nayokpuk (1929–2006), known as the "Shishmaref Cannonball," finished the Iditarod Trail Sled Dog Race numerous times, including a second-place finish.

== Demographics ==
Historical population
Census	Pop.	Note	%±
1920	131		—
1930	223		70.2%
1940	257		15.2%
1950	194		−24.5%
1960	217		11.9%
1970	267		23.0%
1980	394		47.6%
1990	456		15.7%
2000	562		23.2%
2010	563		0.2%
2020	576		2.3%
U.S. Decennial Census

Shishmaref first appeared on the 1920 U.S. Census as an unincorporated village. It formally incorporated in 1969.

=== 2020 census ===
As of the 2020 census, Shishmaref had a population of 576. The median age was 29.0 years. 31.8% of residents were under the age of 18 and 9.2% of residents were 65 years of age or older. For every 100 females there were 129.5 males, and for every 100 females age 18 and over there were 139.6 males age 18 and over.

0.0% of residents lived in urban areas, while 100.0% lived in rural areas.

There were 154 households in Shishmaref, of which 52.6% had children under the age of 18 living in them. Of all households, 25.3% were married-couple households, 29.9% were households with a male householder and no spouse or partner present, and 23.4% were households with a female householder and no spouse or partner present. About 20.8% of all households were made up of individuals and 3.2% had someone living alone who was 65 years of age or older.

There were 166 housing units, of which 7.2% were vacant. The homeowner vacancy rate was 0.0% and the rental vacancy rate was 5.0%.

Racial composition as of the 2020 census
Race	Number	Percent
White	15	2.6%
Black or African American	4	0.7%
American Indian and Alaska Native	555	96.4%
Asian	0	0.0%
Native Hawaiian and Other Pacific Islander	0	0.0%
Some other race	0	0.0%
Two or more races	2	0.3%
Hispanic or Latino (of any race)	0	0.0%

=== 2000 census ===
As of the 2000 census, there were 562 people, 142 households, and 110 families residing in the city. The population density was 202.0 inhabitants per square mile (78.0/km^{2}). There were 148 housing units at an average density of 53.2 per square mile (20.5/km^{2}). The racial makeup of the city was 93.24% Native American (mainly Inupiat), 5.34% White, and 1.42% from two or more races. Hispanic or Latino of any race were 0.53% of the population.

Of the 142 households, 52.8% had children under the age of 18 living with them, 36.6% were married couples living together, 19.7% had a female householder with no husband present, and 22.5% were non-families. 21.1% of all households were made up of individuals, and 4.2% had someone living alone who was 65 years of age or older. The average household size was 3.96 and the average family size was 4.59.

In the city, the population was spread out, with 40.9% under the age of 18, 11.4% from 18 to 24, 29.4% from 25 to 44, 12.6% from 45 to 64, and 5.7% who were 65 years of age or older. The median age was 24 years. For every 100 females, there were 125.7 males. For every 100 females age 18 and over, there were 121.3 males.

The median income for a household in the city was $30,714, and the median income for a family was $29,306. Males had a median income of $35,357 versus $25,000 for females. The per capita income for the city was $10,487. About 16.2% of families and 16.3% of the population were below the poverty line, including 21.2% of those under age 18 and 10.5% of those age 65 or over.

== Education ==
Shishmaref is served by the Bering Strait School District. Shishmaref School is the only school in town and serves grades Pre-K through 12 with a population of 183 students and 33 pre-school children. There are 19 teachers at Shishmaref School and is the largest and newest building in settlement.

== Transportation ==
There are three main roads, Main Street-Airport Road, Housing Trail and Clinic Road. Roads are not paved but have street lighting and do not connect to the outside beyond Shishmaref. Vehicles are mostly ATVs with a few private vehicles and dirt motorcycles.

Some residents will travel by wood vessels around Sarichef Island and a barge delivers goods and materials to Shishmaref when it is ice free.

Shishmaref Airport is the only means of connecting the town to the rest of Alaska. The airport replaced an earlier airport which is now occupied by housing near the lagoon.

== Housing ==
Houses in Shishmaref are pre-fabricated and mostly single story. Construction material is mostly wood board and sometimes metal. The homes are often damaged from erosion.

== Local businesses and other places of interest ==
=== Government ===
- US Post Office
- New Airport
- City Offices
- Shishmaref School

=== Business ===
- Shishmaref Native Store
- Nayokpuk General Store
- Washeteria
- Tannery

=== Services ===
- Friendship Center
- Bingo Hall - near Main Street and Clinic Road
- Shishmaref Lutheran Church and Cemetery
- IRA Building
- Bulk Fuel Tank - city owned

== Services ==
Local healthcare services are provided by the Katherine Miksruag Olanna Health Clinic, a member of the Norton Sound Health Corporation (NSHC) based in Nome, AK. Certified health aides provide general services including lab work, vaccinations, health screenings, and treatment of acute health issues. The clinic utilizes NSHC's electronic medical record system, as well as other modern technologies including video teleconferencing and remote medication dispensing, in order to provide quality care to its patients. Healthcare providers of various specialties also routinely visit the clinic to provide additional services, screenings, and chronic disease state management.

Policing is provided by Shishmaref Police Department and fire services are provided by Shishmaref Volunteer Fire Department.
