= Wales, Alaska =

Wales Kiŋigin (Inupiaq)
- City
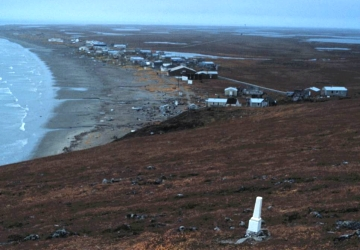
- View of the Wales Site, with the city of Wales in the background
- Nickname: Kingegan
- Location in Alaska
- Coordinates: 65°36′44″N 168°05′21″W
- Country: United States
- State: Alaska
- Census Area: Nome
- Incorporated: April 16, 1964

Government
  - Mayor: Stanley Milligrock
  - State senator: Donald Olson (D)
  - State rep.: Neal Foster (D)

Area
  - Total: 2.31 sq mi (5.97 km^{2})
  - Land: 2.31 sq mi (5.97 km^{2})
  - Water: 0 sq mi (0.00 km^{2})
- Elevation: 26 ft (8 m)

Population (2020)
  - Total: 168
  - Density: 72.9/sq mi (28.16/km^{2})
- Time zone: UTC-9 (Alaska (AKST))
  - Summer (DST): UTC-8 (AKDT)
- ZIP code: 99783
- Area code: 907
- FIPS code: 02-82860
- GNIS feature ID: 1404755, 2418870

Wales (Inupiaq: Kiŋigin, IPA: [kiŋiɣin]) is a city in the Nome Census Area, Alaska, United States. As of the 2020 census, Wales had a population of 168. It is the westernmost city on the North American mainland, although Adak, located on Adak Island, is the westernmost city in Alaska. Wales Airport serves Wales with flights on Bering Air and Ravn Alaska to Nome.

== History ==
A burial mound from the Birnirk culture (500 to 900 AD) was discovered near Wales and is now a National Historic Landmark.

In 1827, a Russian Navy report listed the Inupiat villages of "Eidamoo" near the coast and "King-a-ghe" inland in the area.

In 1890, the American Missionary Association established a mission at the site of present-day Wales. In the 1890s, reindeer (domesticated caribou) were brought to the area and in 1894 a reindeer station was established. Wales became an important whaling center due to its location along whale migratory routes, and it was the region's largest and most prosperous village, with more than 500 residents. Wales is named after Cape Prince of Wales, which itself was named by Captain Cook in 1778.

The 1918 flu pandemic decimated the population and economy of Wales.

In 1947, a group of Chukchi warriors from the USSR crossed the Bering strait and raided the town, killing several dozen Inupiat residents and stealing reindeer.

In 2002 a wind-diesel system became operational.

On November 9, 2011, the city experienced the 2011 Bering Sea superstorm. Wind gusts of 89 miles per hour (143 km/h) were recorded in Wales.

On January 17, 2023, a polar bear entered the community of Wales and chased multiple residents. The bear fatally attacked a woman and her 1-year-old son. It was shot and killed by a local resident as it mauled the pair. This was Alaska's first reported polar bear attack in over 30 years.

== Geography ==
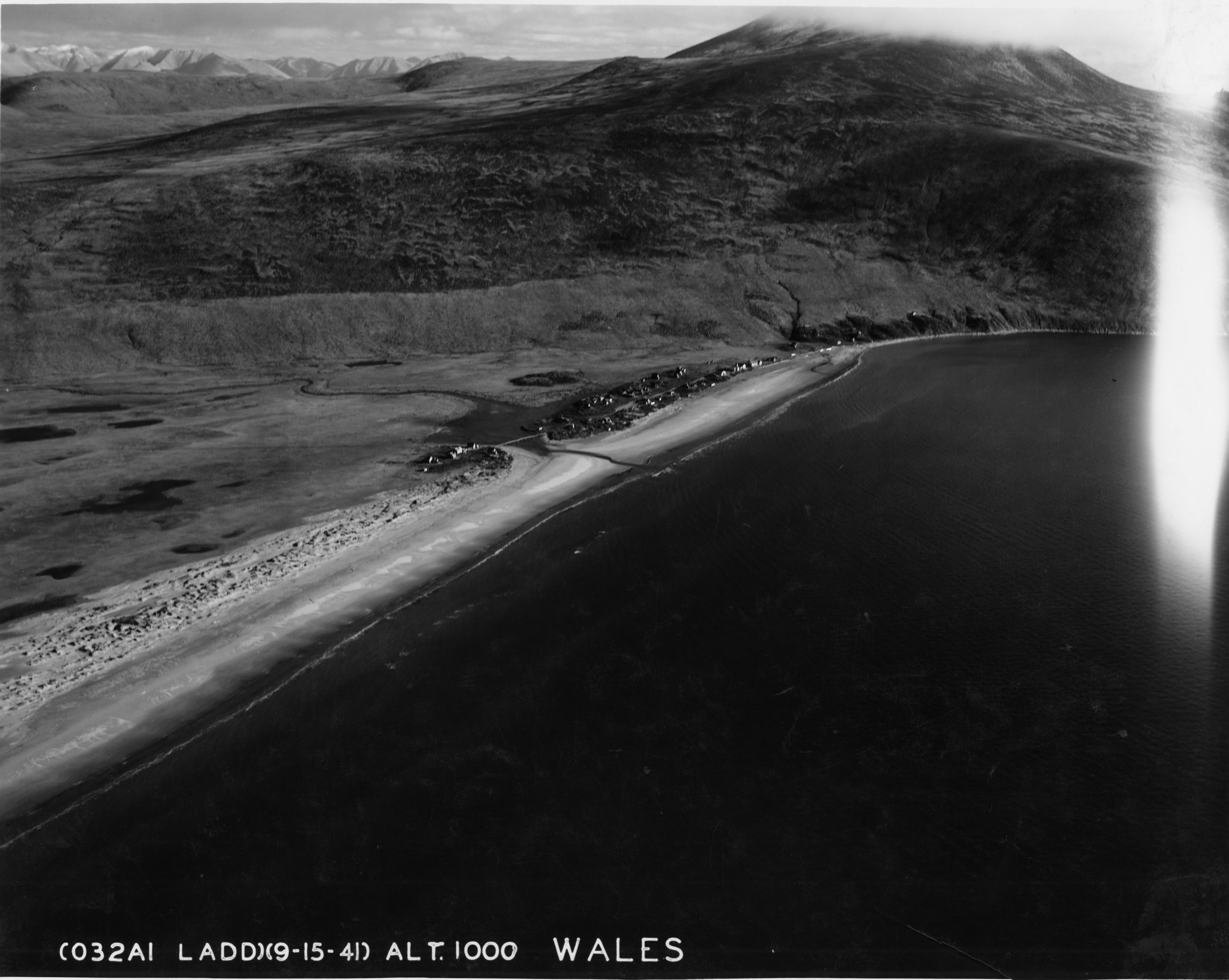
Summer in Wales, 1940s

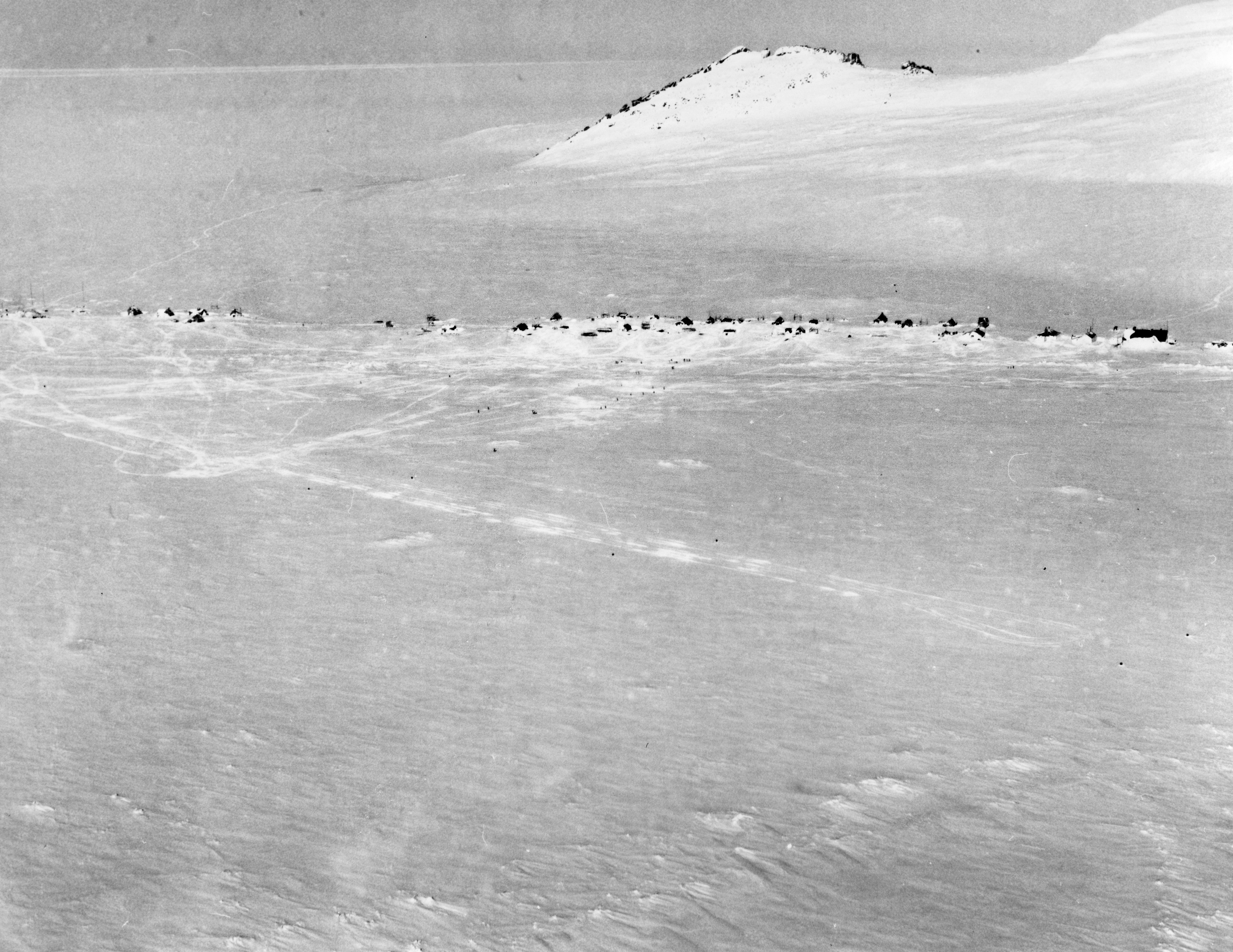
Wales in Winter, 1940s

Wales is located at 65°36′44″N 168°5′21″W (65.612116, −168.089285).

Wales is located on the westernmost point of the American mainland, Cape Prince of Wales, on the western tip of the Seward Peninsula. It is at the northern end of the Continental Divide where the Pacific Ocean and Arctic Ocean meet. It is 111 miles (179 km) northwest of Nome.

According to the United States Census Bureau, the city has a total area of 2.8 square miles (7.3 km^{2}), all of it land.

== Demographics ==
Historical population
Census	Pop.	Note	%±
1880	400		—
1890	488		22.0%
1900	396		−18.9%
1910	337		−14.9%
1920	136		−59.6%
1930	170		25.0%
1940	193		13.5%
1950	141		−26.9%
1960	128		−9.2%
1970	131		2.3%
1980	133		1.5%
1990	161		21.1%
2000	152		−5.6%
2010	145		−4.6%
2020	168		15.9%
U.S. Decennial Census

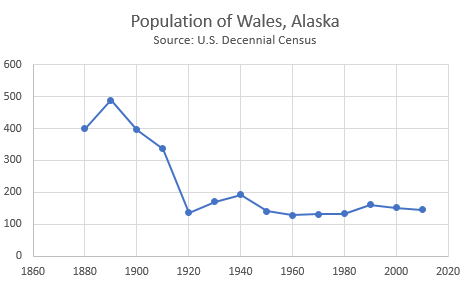
Population of Wales, Alaska

Wales first appeared on the 1880 U.S. Census as the unincorporated Inuit village of "Kingigin." It was returned in 1890 as "Kingaghee." In 1900 and 1910, it was returned as Cape Prince of Wales (Settlements). In 1920, it was shortened to its present name of Wales. It formally incorporated in 1964.

=== 2020 census ===
As of the 2020 census, Wales had a population of 168. The median age was 26.0 years. 38.7% of residents were under the age of 18 and 4.8% of residents were 65 years of age or older. For every 100 females there were 140.0 males, and for every 100 females age 18 and over there were 151.2 males age 18 and over.

0.0% of residents lived in urban areas, while 100.0% lived in rural areas.

There were 43 households in Wales, of which 58.1% had children under the age of 18 living in them. Of all households, 23.3% were married-couple households, 37.2% were households with a male householder and no spouse or partner present, and 16.3% were households with a female householder and no spouse or partner present. About 25.6% of all households were made up of individuals and 9.3% had someone living alone who was 65 years of age or older.

There were 89 housing units, of which 51.7% were vacant. The homeowner vacancy rate was 0.0% and the rental vacancy rate was 4.2%.

Racial composition as of the 2020 census
Race	Number	Percent
White	11	6.5%
Black or African American	0	0.0%
American Indian and Alaska Native	146	86.9%
Asian	3	1.8%
Native Hawaiian and Other Pacific Islander	2	1.2%
Some other race	1	0.6%
Two or more races	5	3.0%
Hispanic or Latino (of any race)	3	1.8%

=== 2000 census ===
At the 2000 census there were 152 people in 50 households, including 28 families, in the city. The population density was 53.9 inhabitants per square mile (20.8/km^{2}). There were 59 housing units at an average density of 20.9 per square mile (8.1/km^{2}). The racial makeup of the city was 8.55% White (13 people), 0.66% Black or African American (1 person), 83.55% (127 people) Native American, 0.66% from other races, and 6.58% (10 people) from two or more races. Hispanic or Latino of any race were 0.66%.

Of the 50 households 38.0% had children under the age of 18 living with them, 38.0% were married couples living together, 8.0% had a female householder with no husband present, and 44.0% were non-families. 40.0% of households were one person and 6.0% were one person aged 65 or older. The average household size was 3.04 and the average family size was 4.43.

The age distribution was 38.2% under the age of 18, 11.8% from 18 to 24, 25.7% from 25 to 44, 21.1% from 45 to 64, and 3.3% 65 or older. The median age was 26 years. For every 100 females, there were 111.1 males. For every 100 females age 18 and over, there were 141.0 males.

The median household income was $33,333 and the median family income was $39,583. Wales had a median income of $29,375 versus $22,188 for females. The per capita income for the city was $14,877. About 17.2% of families and 18.3% of the population were below the poverty line, including 26.2% of those under the age of 18 and 50.0% of those 65 or over.

== Climate ==
Wales is located within the polar climate zone (Köppen ET).

Climate data for Wales, Alaska (1971–2000 normals, extremes 1925–1995)
Month	Jan	Feb	Mar	Apr	May	Jun	Jul	Aug	Sep	Oct	Nov	Dec	Year
Record high °F (°C)	53 (12)	49 (9)	42 (6)	48 (9)	57 (14)	72 (22)	75 (24)	73 (23)	66 (19)	54 (12)	67 (19)	44 (7)	75 (24)
Mean maximum °F (°C)	35.1 (1.7)	30.1 (−1.1)	30.2 (−1.0)	34.7 (1.5)	44.8 (7.1)	57.4 (14.1)	63.7 (17.6)	61.5 (16.4)	53.3 (11.8)	43.0 (6.1)	37.7 (3.2)	33.3 (0.7)	65.2 (18.4)
Mean daily maximum °F (°C)	7.2 (−13.8)	4.3 (−15.4)	5.4 (−14.8)	16.0 (−8.9)	32.2 (0.1)	43.4 (6.3)	51.9 (11.1)	51.0 (10.6)	44.1 (6.7)	32.6 (0.3)	22.0 (−5.6)	9.9 (−12.3)	26.7 (−2.9)
Daily mean °F (°C)	3.0 (−16.1)	−2.5 (−19.2)	−1.4 (−18.6)	9.7 (−12.4)	27.5 (−2.5)	38.5 (3.6)	47.4 (8.6)	47.0 (8.3)	40.5 (4.7)	28.6 (−1.9)	16.5 (−8.6)	3.8 (−15.7)	21.5 (−5.8)
Mean daily minimum °F (°C)	−6.7 (−21.5)	−9.3 (−22.9)	−8.2 (−22.3)	3.4 (−15.9)	22.8 (−5.1)	33.5 (0.8)	42.9 (6.1)	43.0 (6.1)	36.8 (2.7)	24.6 (−4.1)	10.9 (−11.7)	−2.3 (−19.1)	16.0 (−8.9)
Mean minimum °F (°C)	−27.0 (−32.8)	−30.5 (−34.7)	−28.2 (−33.4)	−16.7 (−27.1)	4.2 (−15.4)	25.6 (−3.6)	34.8 (1.6)	36.1 (2.3)	28.1 (−2.2)	9.7 (−12.4)	−8.0 (−22.2)	−20.9 (−29.4)	−33.3 (−36.3)
Record low °F (°C)	−44 (−42)	−44 (−42)	−42 (−41)	−32 (−36)	−11 (−24)	20 (−7)	23 (−5)	30 (−1)	19 (−7)	−7 (−22)	−28 (−33)	−35 (−37)	−44 (−42)
Average precipitation inches (mm)	0.41 (10)	0.45 (11)	0.48 (12)	0.27 (6.9)	0.54 (14)	0.73 (19)	1.47 (37)	2.46 (62)	1.99 (51)	1.41 (36)	0.68 (17)	0.52 (13)	11.41 (290)
Average snowfall inches (cm)	4.1 (10)	3.8 (9.7)	4.5 (11)	3.3 (8.4)	2.2 (5.6)	0.2 (0.51)	0.2 (0.51)	0.0 (0.0)	1.4 (3.6)	6.2 (16)	7.7 (20)	4.6 (12)	38.2 (97.32)
Source 1: NOAA (normals, 1971–2000), Weather.com (extremes)
Source 2: WRCC

== Education ==
Wales is served by the Bering Strait School District. Wales Kingikmiut School serves grades Pre-K through 12.
