= Shishmaref Inlet =

Lagoon in the state of Alaska, United States

- Qigiqtam Imaġzrua (Inupiaq)
- Location within Alaska
- Location: Nome Census Area, Alaska
- Coordinates: 66°10′N 165°55′W
- Type: lagoon

The Shishmaref Inlet (Inupiaq: Qigiqtam Imaġzrua) is a coastal lagoon on the Chukchi Sea-facing shores of Alaska. It is 5 miles in length.

The location of the Shishmaref Inlet is SW 17 mi. to the SW from Sarichef Island, at the mouth of the Serpentine River, Kotzebue-Kobuk Low.

This lagoon was named Shishmaref Bay in 1816 by explorer Lt. Otto von Kotzebue, of the Imperial Russian Navy, after Capt. Lt. Gleb Shishmaryov who accompanied him on his exploration.
