= Frontier Flying Service =

American airline operating in Alaska

IATA	ICAO	Call sign
2F	FTA	FRONTIER-AIR
- Founded: 1950; 76 years ago
- Ceased operations: 2014; 12 years ago
- Hubs: Fairbanks International Airport
- Secondary hubs: Wiley Post–Will Rogers Memorial Airport; Ted Stevens Anchorage International Airport; Ralph Wien Memorial Airport; Bethel Airport
- Frequent-flyer program: YES
- Fleet size: 7
- Parent company: Era Alaska
- Headquarters: Fairbanks, Alaska, USA
- Website: www.frontierflying.com (archived)

Frontier Flying Service (d/b/a Ravn Connect) was an American airline headquartered in Fairbanks, Alaska, United States. It operated an extensive network of year-round scheduled commuter services and postal services to Alaska bush communities, primarily north of Fairbanks, as well as charter services to the lower 48 and Canada.

Its main base was in Fairbanks (Fairbanks International Airport), with hubs in Utqiagvik (Wiley Post–Will Rogers Memorial Airport), Anchorage (Ted Stevens Anchorage International Airport), Kotzebue (Ralph Wien Memorial Airport) and Bethel (Bethel Airport).

== History ==
Frontier Flying Service was established in 1950 by retired Air Force Colonel Richard McIntyre, catering to Alaska bush communities as a scheduled mail carrier for Wien Air Alaska, as well as providing charters throughout Alaska. In 1974, Frontier was purchased by John Hajdukovich.

In 2005 the airline merged with Cape Smythe Air Services, taking on their routes and retaining the Frontier Flying Service name.

During the spring of 2008 Frontier Flying Service began the process of merging with Hageland Aviation Services, the companies continue to operate separate certificates with Frontier Flying Service providing service between major hubs and focus communities with the Beech 1900C aircraft while Hagleand Air Service provides point to point service out of the hubs and focus communities to smaller villages, both companies do business under the name "Frontier Alaska" and have begun merging resources and operations at all their shared airports. This merger makes Frontier Alaska the largest commuter passenger carrier in the state of Alaska (by fleet size and number of routes).

On July 8, 2008, Seattle-based Alaska Airlines announced Frontier Flying Service (d.b.a Frontier Alaska) as a new code share partner beginning in the fall of 2008.

On February 27, 2009, Frontier Flying Service's holding company, Frontier Alaska, acquired rival Era Aviation of Anchorage, Alaska.

By 2014, with the fleet rationalization and post acquisition of Era Aviation almost complete by the HoTH Airline group, Frontier Flying Service performed the mission of flying cargo and passenger charters for the other Ravn branded companies, Corvus Airlines and Hageland Aviation, but also utilizing the branding of Ravn Connect.

After the bankruptcy of Ravn Alaska the assets were sold "in pieces" to other airlines of Alaska in July 2020.

== Fleet ==
The Frontier Flying Service fleet consisted of the following aircraft (as of 2011):

Type	Number
Piper PA-31-350	2
Raytheon Beech BE-1900-C	3
Shorts SD3-30	2

== Destinations ==
Frontier Flying Service operated scheduled service to the following destinations in Alaska as of 2007:

- Anchorage (ANC) - Ted Stevens Anchorage International Airport
- Aniak (ANI) - Aniak Airport
- Anvik (ANV) - Anvik Airport
- Atqasuk (ATK) - Atqasuk Edward Burnell Sr. Memorial Airport
- Barrow (BRW) - Wiley Post–Will Rogers Memorial Airport
- Barter Island / Kaktovik (BTI) - Barter Island LRRS Airport
- Bethel (BET) - Bethel Airport
- Brevig Mission (KTS) - Brevig Mission Airport
- Buckland (BKC) - Buckland Airport
- Deadhorse (SCC) - Deadhorse Airport
- Deering (DRG) - Deering Airport
- Elim (ELI) - Elim Airport
- Fairbanks (FAI) - Fairbanks International Airport
- Fort Yukon (FYU) - Fort Yukon Airport
- Galena (GAL) - Edward G. Pitka Sr. Airport
- Gambell (GAM) - Gambell Airport
- Golovin (GLV) - Golovin Airport
- Grayling (KGX) - Grayling Airport
- Holy Cross (HCR) - Holy Cross Airport
- Huslia (HSL) - Huslia Airport
- Kalskag (KLG) - Kalskag Airport
- Kaltag (KAL) - Kaltag Airport
- Kiana (IAN) - Bob Baker Memorial Airport
- Kivalina (KVL) - Kivalina Airport
- Kotzebue (OTZ) - Ralph Wien Memorial Airport
- Koyuk (KKA) - Koyuk Alfred Adams Airport
- Koyukuk (KYU) - Koyukuk Airport
- Noatak (WTK) - Noatak Airport
- Nome (OME) - Nome Airport
- Noorvik (ORV) - Robert (Bob) Curtis Memorial Airport
- Nuiqsut (AQT/NUI) - Nuiqsut Airport
- Nulato (NUL) - Nulato Airport
- Point Hope (PHO) - Point Hope Airport
- Point Lay (PIZ) - Point Lay LRRS Airport
- Ruby (RBY) - Ruby Airport
- Russian Mission (RSH) - Russian Mission Airport
- Savoonga (SVA) - Savoonga Airport
- Selawik (WLK) - Selawik Airport
- Shageluk (SHX) - Shageluk Airport
- Shishmaref (SHH) - Shishmaref Airport
- St. Mary's (KSM) - St. Mary's Airport
- Tanana (TAL) - Ralph M. Calhoun Memorial Airport
- Teller (TLA) - Teller Airport
- Wainwright (AIN) - Wainwright Airport
- Wales (WAA) - Wales Airport
- White Mountain (WMO) - White Mountain Airport

== Community awareness ==
Frontier Flying Service, along with Bering Air, Grant Aviation, Northern Air Cargo, PenAir, and Ryan Air, participated in the Flying Can service, which allows rural Alaskan communities to recycle aluminum cans and PET bottles in cooperation with Alaskans for Litter Prevention and Recycling.

== Accidents and incidents ==
- On October 30, 1979, Douglas C-47B N99663 was written off in a landing accident at Bettles Airport, Alaska. The aircraft struck three parked aircraft. It was on a cargo flight from Fairbanks International Airport, Alaska, to Ambler Airport, Alaska via Bettles. All four aircraft were substantially damaged.

== See also ==
- List of defunct airlines of the United States
