= Bering Air =

American airline

| IATA | ICAO | Call sign |
|---|---|---|
| 8E | BRG | BERING AIR |
- Commenced operations: October 3, 1979
- AOC #: FXTA050A
- Hubs: Nome; Kotzebue; Unalakleet
- Frequent-flyer program: Gold Points
- Subsidiaries: Twin Peak Adventures
- Fleet size: 39
- Destinations: 32
- Headquarters: Nome, Alaska, U.S.
- Key people: James Rowe (President and CEO)
- Employees: 115
- Website: www.beringair.com

Bering Air is an American airline headquartered in Nome, Alaska, United States. It operates domestic scheduled passenger and charter airline services, as well as air ambulance and helicopter services. Its main base is Nome Airport, with hubs at Ralph Wien Memorial Airport (Kotzebue) and Unalakleet Airport.

== History ==
In early 1975, Jim Rowe and three college friends embarked on a journey from northern Michigan, and traveled across America in a Cessna 195, landing in Mexico's Baja California peninsula, and eventually settling on the beaches of Nome, Alaska. A few years later, in September 1979, Bering Air was established. It commenced operations on October 3, 1979, with a single De Havilland Canada DHC-3 Otter. Later, in 1983, with instigation of the increasingly popular bypass mail system, the airline added other small aircraft, including the Piper Navajo, Beech 18, and Piper Seneca. Bering Air, in favor of modern, turbine powered aircraft, later phased out aircraft equipped with radial engines. Thus, the Beechcraft King Air 200, Beechcraft 1900D, Cessna Caravan, and CASA C-212 were introduced. Furthermore, off airport duties were transferred to helicopters, instead of older piston powered aircraft. In 2015, the airline upgraded its fleet with eight Cessna 208EX Grand Caravan aircraft replacing its older Cessna 208B aircraft. Today, the airline is wholly owned by Jim Rowe (President) and Christine Rowe.

In July 2020 Bering Air bought at Ravn Alaska's bankruptcy auction the facilities in Aniak, Kotzebue, Nome and Unalakleet.

== Fleet ==
As of February 2025, the Bering Air fleet consists of the following aircraft:

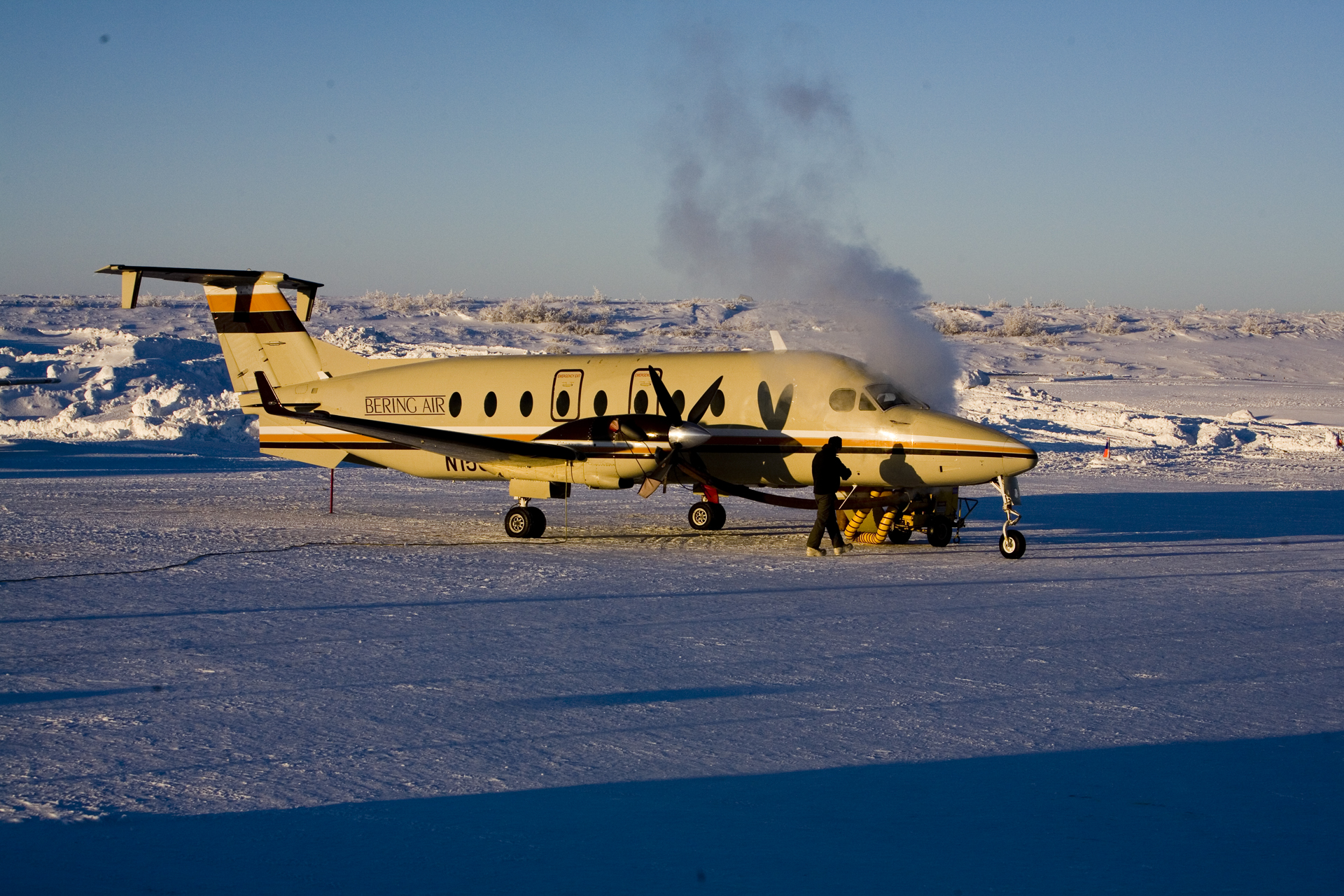
Bering Air Beech 1900D at Nome, Alaska

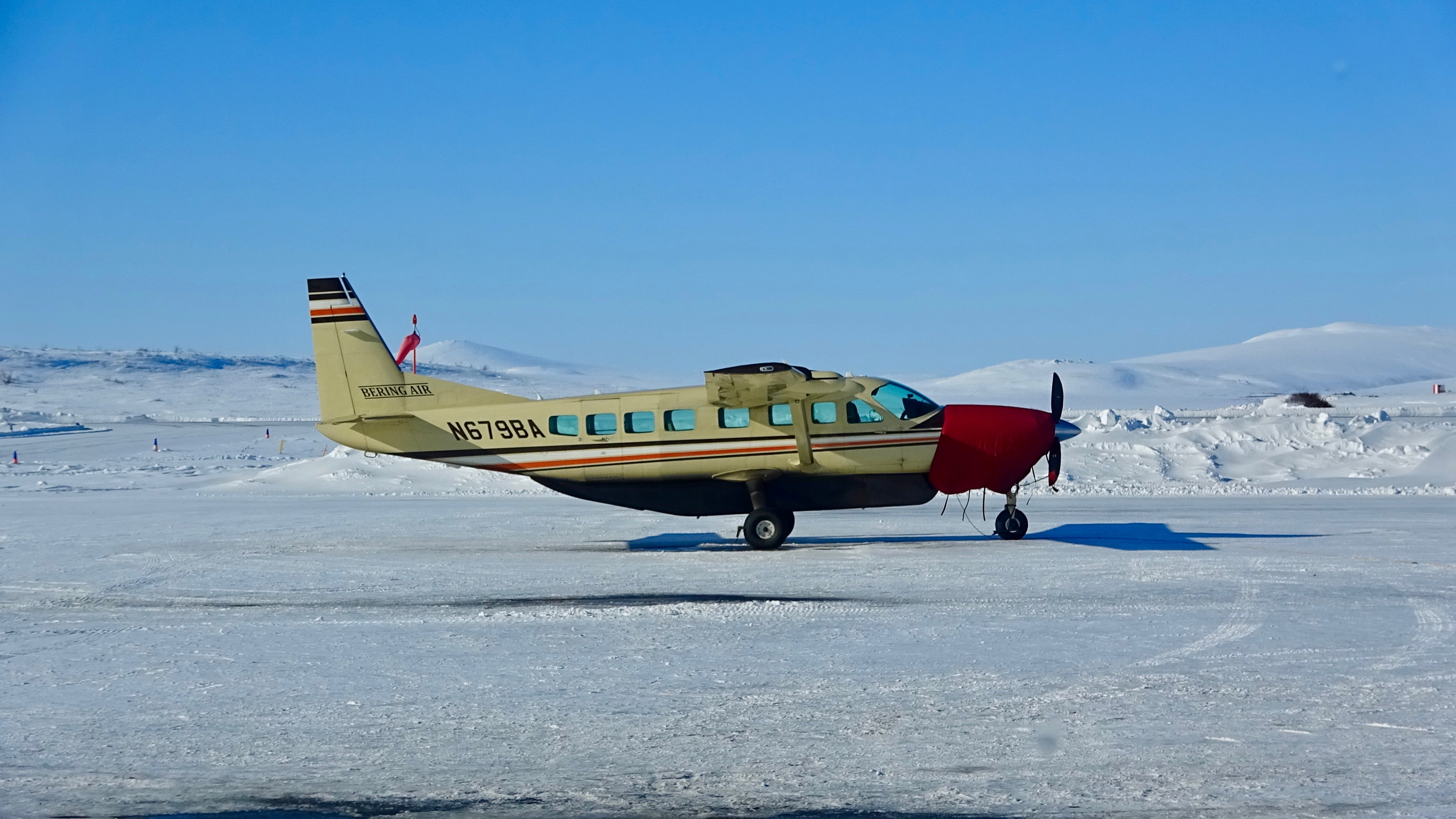
A Bering Air Cessna 208B Grand Caravan in Nome, Alaska

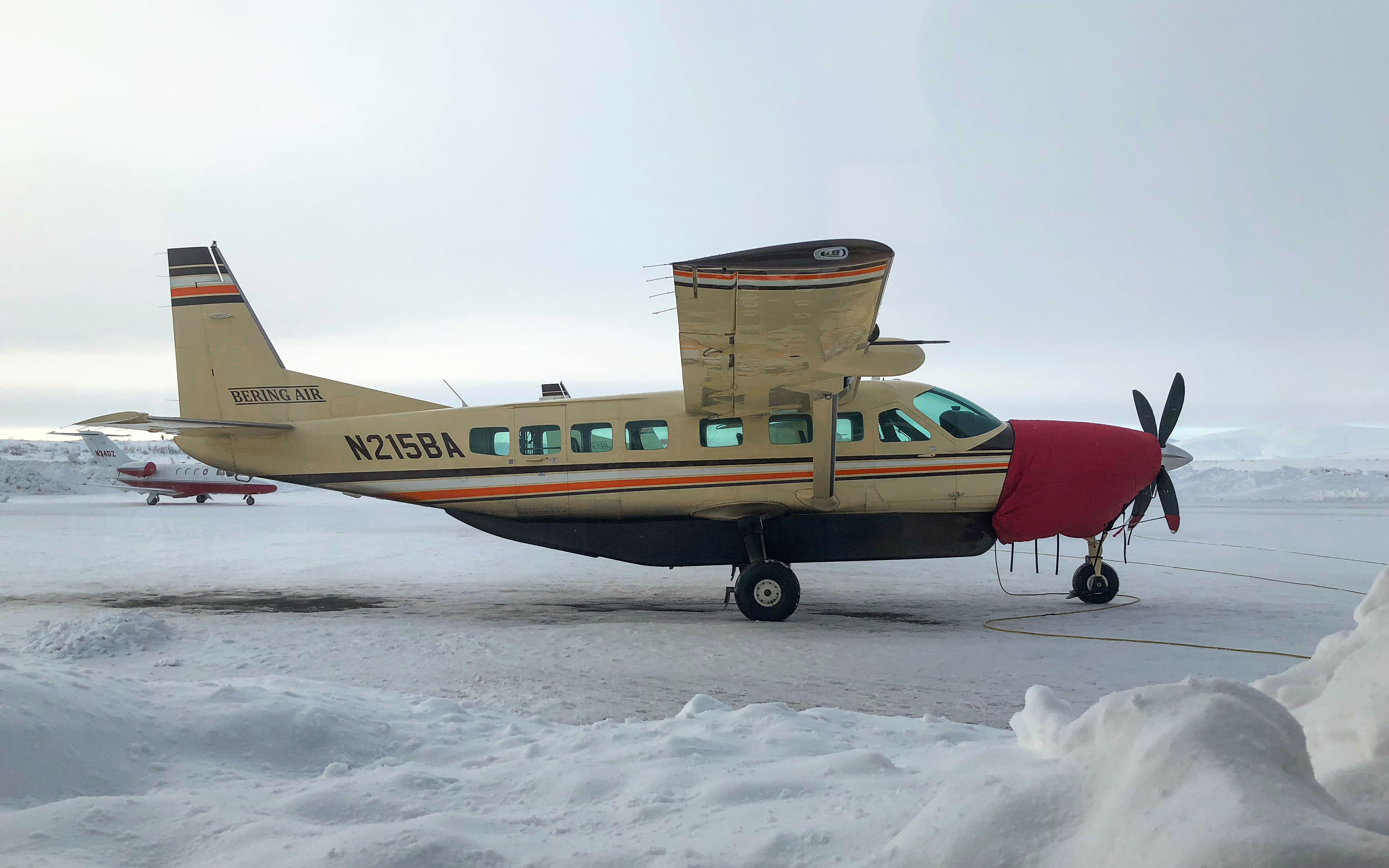
Bering Air Cessna 208B Grand Caravan

Bering Air fleet
| Aircraft | Total | Passengers | Notes |
|---|---|---|---|
| Piper PA-31 Navajo | 4 | 9 | |
| Cessna Caravan EX | 17 | 9 | |
| Cessna 408 SkyCourier | 4 (as of August 2025) | 0 | Cargo |
| Beechcraft 1900D | 4(as of August 2025) | 19 | "Combi" configuration on scheduled flights |
| Beechcraft King Air 200 | 4 | 9 | Air ambulance configuration |
| CASA 212-200 | 2 | 0 | Cargo |
| MD Helicopter MD 500E | 3 | 3 AS 350B3 2 | Long Line capable UH-1H Huey 2 |
| Robinson R44 Raven II | 3 | 3 | Also operates two R44s for Twin Peak Adventures. |
| Bell UH-1H Iroquois | 2 | 15 | |
| Airbus Helicopters H125 | 2 | 5 | |

=== Retired fleet ===
Bering Air has previously operated the following aircraft:

Bering Air retired fleet
| Aircraft | Replacement |
|---|---|
| De Havilland Canada DHC-3 Otter | Cessna 208B Caravan |
| De Havilland Canada DHC-2 Beaver | |
| Cessna 206/207 | |
| Cessna 208B Caravan | Cessna Caravan EX |
| Beechcraft 18 | CASA C-212 |
| Piper Seneca | |
| Mitsubishi MU-2 | |
| Piper PA-31 Navajo | |

== Community services ==
Bering Air, along with Grant Aviation, Frontier Flying Service, Northern Air Cargo, PenAir, and Ryan Air Services, participates in the Flying Can service, which allows rural Alaskan communities to recycle aluminum cans and now number 1 PET bottles in cooperation with Alaskans for Litter Prevention and Recycling.

Bering Air provides free delivery on scheduled flights for Airport Pizza, a pizzeria at Nome Airport that takes orders from remote locations served by Bering Air.

== Destinations ==
Passenger and cargo charter services are flown from Kotzebue and Nome to destinations throughout the United States, and Russia.

=== Domestic ===
Bering Air offers scheduled passenger service to 29 cities in Western Alaska from hubs in Nome, Kotzebue and Unalakleet.

1. Ambler (ABL) – Ambler Airport
2. Brevig Mission (KTS) – Brevig Mission Airport
3. Buckland (BKC) – Buckland Airport
4. Cape Lisburne (LUR) – Cape Lisburne LRRS Airport
5. Deering (DRG) – Deering Airport
6. Elim (ELI) – Elim Airport
7. Gambell (GAM) – Gambell Airport
8. Golovin (GLV) – Golovin Airport
9. Kiana (IAN) – Bob Baker Memorial Airport
10. Kivalina (KVL) – Kivalina Airport
11. Kobuk (OBU) – Kobuk Airport
12. Kotzebue (OTZ) – Ralph Wien Memorial Airport
13. Koyuk (KKA) – Koyuk Alfred Adams Airport
14. Noatak (WTK) – Noatak Airport
15. Nome (OME) – Nome Airport
16. Noorvik (ORV) – Robert (Bob) Curtis Memorial Airport
17. Point Hope (PHO) – Point Hope Airport
18. St. Michael (SMK) – St. Michael Airport
19. Savoonga (SVA) – Savoonga Airport
20. Selawik (WLK) – Selawik Airport
21. Shaktoolik (SKK) – Shaktoolik Airport
22. Shishmaref (SHH) – Shishmaref Airport
23. Shungnak (SHG) – Shungnak Airport
24. Stebbins (WBB) – Stebbins Airport
25. Teller (TLA) – Teller Airport
26. Tin City (TNC) – Tin City LRRS Airport
27. Unalakleet (UNK) – Unalakleet Airport
28. Wales (WAA) – Wales Airport
29. White Mountain (WMO) – White Mountain Airport

==== Former destinations ====
1. Council (CIL) – Council Airport
2. Diomede (DIO) – Diomede Island Airport (ice runway, winter only)
3. Port Clarence (KPC) – Port Clarence Coast Guard Station

=== International ===
Bering Air offered charter service from Nome and Anchorage to Anadyr and Provideniya in the Russian Far East. This service is currently suspended.

== Accidents and incidents ==
- December 10, 1987 – N9979M, an air taxi cargo flight Cessna 207 Skywagon, crashed into mountains due to bad weather conditions, killing the pilot.
- January 5, 1993 – N900YH, a Mitsubishi MU-2, crashed into the Bering Sea due to fuel starvation, injuring the pilot.
- December 18, 1995 – N340K, a Beechcraft G18S, crashed into the ground due to an in-flight fire shortly after takeoff from Nome Airport, injuring the pilot.
- September 8, 1997 – N1123R, a Cessna 208 Caravan, collided with a Cessna 402 while preparing to depart from Buckland Airport. All 17 people on board both planes were evacuated uninjured.
- March 2, 2003 – N205BA, a Cessna 208 Caravan, crashed into snow-covered sea ice due to a whiteout condition. The pilot was injured and the aircraft was repaired.
- October 24, 2005 – N1263Y, a Cessna 208 Caravan, crashed into the ground due to pilot error. The two pilots were injured and the aircraft was repaired.
- September 18, 2009 – N349TA, a CASA C-212 Aviocar, overran runway 05 at Savoonga Airport. The two pilots were evacuated uninjured and the aircraft was repaired.
- October 21, 2017 – N363JH, an air ambulance Beechcraft B200, made a belly landing at Ted Stevens Anchorage International Airport. All four people on board were evacuated uninjured and the aircraft was repaired.
- February 6, 2025 – Bering Air Flight 445, a Cessna 208B Grand Caravan, crashed onto ice around Norton Sound with 10 people on board. The pilot and the nine passengers perished.
