= Cape Lisburne LRRS Airport =

U.S. Military Airport

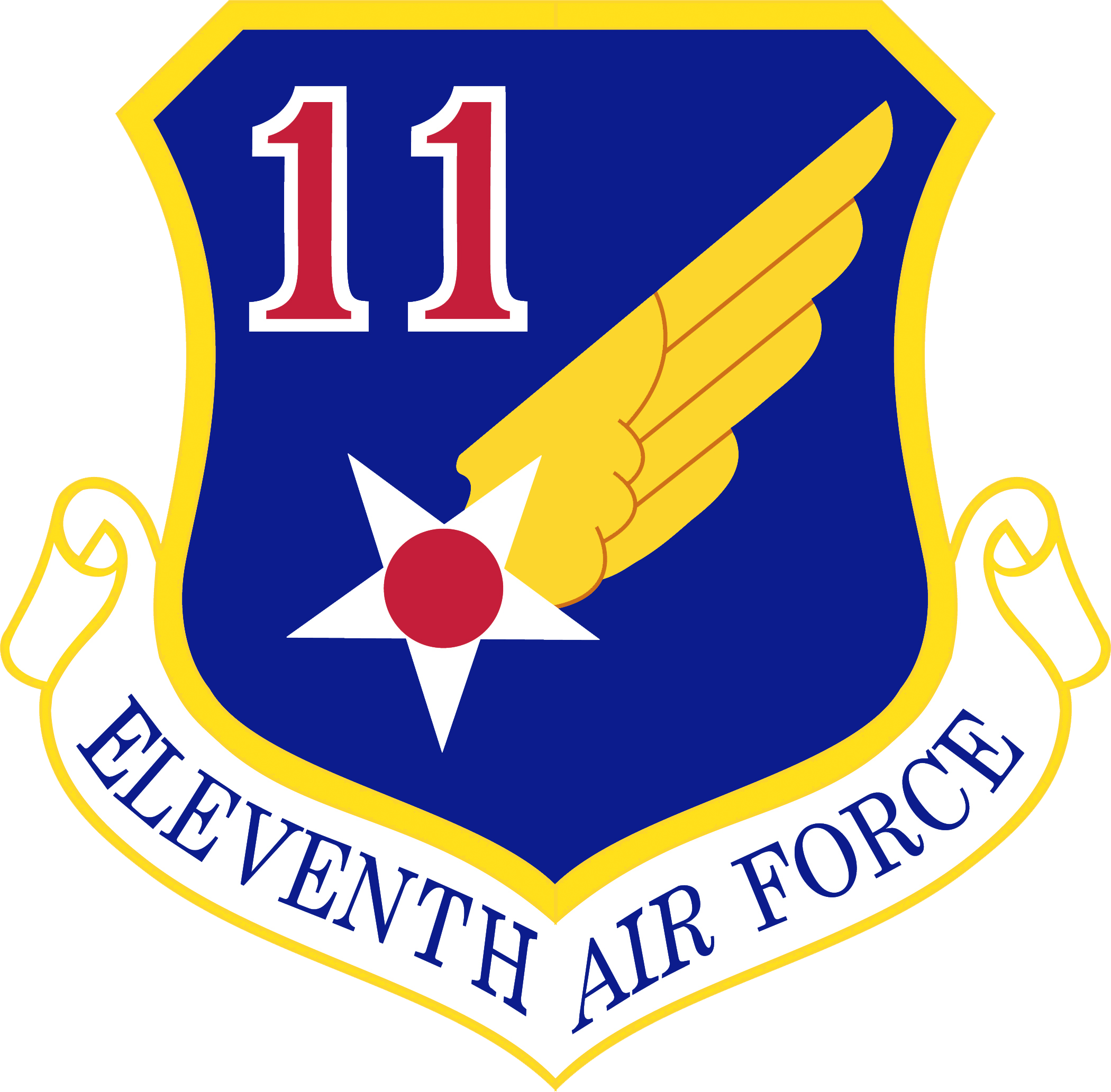
Cape Lisburne LRRS Airport
- IATA: LUR; ICAO: PALU; FAA LID: LUR

Summary
- Airport type: Military
- Owner: U.S. Air Force
- Location: Cape Lisburne, Alaska
- Elevation AMSL: 16 ft (4.9 m)
- Coordinates: 68°52′30″N 166°06′40″W

Map
- Location of airport in Alaska

Runways
Direction	Length		Surface
Direction	ft	m	Surface
08/26	4,800	1,463	Gravel

Statistics (2015)
- Aircraft operations: 0
- Based aircraft: 0
- Passengers: 268
- Freight: 84,000 lbs
- Source: Federal Aviation Administration

Cape Lisburne LRRS Airport (IATA: LUR, ICAO: PALU, FAA LID: LUR) is a military airport located on Cape Lisburne, at the northwest point of the Lisburne Peninsula in the North Slope Borough of the U.S. state of Alaska. The airport is owned by the U.S. Air Force. It is also known as Cape Lisburne Airport.

It is located within the Alaska Maritime National Wildlife Refuge in northwestern Alaska, between the Arctic Ocean and the Chuckchi Sea. The nearest community is Point Hope, located 25 miles (40 km) to the southwest.

== Overview ==
Cape Lisburne Airport is a United States Air Force military airstrip. Its mission is to provide access to the Cape Lisburne Long Range Radar Station (LRRS) for servicing and other requirements.

The airstrip was built in 1952 during the construction of the Cape Lisburne Air Force Station. It is located on the site of the former Inuit village of Wevok, Alaska. During the station's operational use as a staffed radar station, it provided transportation for station personnel and for supplies and equipment to be airlifted to the station. With the radar station's closure in 1983, the airstrip now provides access to the unattended site for maintenance personnel and other requirements.

It is not staffed by any support personnel, and is not open to the public. During the winter months, it may be inaccessible due to the extreme weather conditions at the location.

== Facilities and aircraft ==
Cape Lisburne LRRS Airport has one runway designated 8/26 with a gravel surface measuring 4,805 by 135 feet (1,465 x 41 m). For the 12-month period ending July 12, 1977, the airport had 200 general aviation aircraft operations, an average of 16 per month.

== Airlines and destinations ==
The following airlines offer scheduled passenger service at this airport:

Airlines	Destinations
Bering Air	Kotzebue

=== Statistics ===
Carrier shares: January – December 2015
Carrier	Passengers (arriving and departing)
Bering Air	209(100.00%)

Top domestic destinations: January – December 2015
Rank	City	Airport	Passengers
1	(Alaska) Kotzebue, AK	Ralph Wien Memorial Airport	106
