= Buckland Airport =

Airport in Alaska, United States

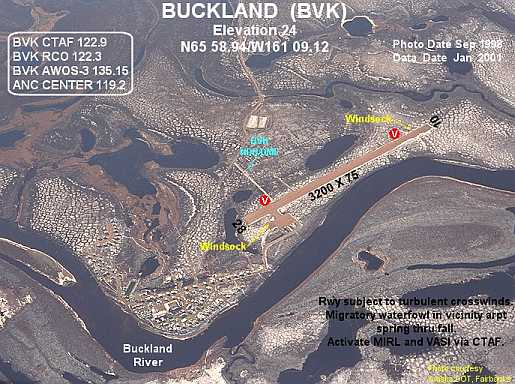
- IATA: BKC; ICAO: PABL; FAA LID: BVK

Summary
- Airport type: Public
- Owner: State of Alaska DOT&PF - Northern Region
- Serves: Buckland, Alaska
- Elevation AMSL: 31 ft (9.4 m)
- Coordinates: 65°58′54″N 161°08′57″W

Map
- Location of airport in Alaska

Runways
Direction	Length		Surface
Direction	ft	m	Surface
11/29	3,200	975	Gravel

Statistics (2015)
- Aircraft operations (2013): 4,250
- Based aircraft: 1
- Passengers: 6,968
- Freight: 1,234,000 lbs
- Source: Federal Aviation Administration

Buckland Airport (IATA: BKC, ICAO: PABL, FAA LID: BVK, formerly 7K5; Iñupiaq: Nunatchiam Mirvia or Kaŋium Mirvia) is a state-owned public-use airport located one nautical mile (1.85 km) southwest of the central business district of Buckland, a city in the Northwest Arctic Borough of the U.S. state of Alaska. The airport is situated on the Buckland River.

Although most U.S. airports use the same three-letter location identifier for the FAA and IATA, this airport is assigned BVK by the FAA and BKC by the IATA (which assigned BVK to Huacaraje, Bolivia). The airport's ICAO identifier is PABL.

== Facilities and aircraft ==
Buckland Airport covers an area of 184 acres (74 ha) at an elevation of 31 feet (9 m) above mean sea level. It has one runway designated 11/29 with a gravel surface measuring 3,200 by 75 feet (975 x 23 m).

== Airlines and destinations ==
Airlines	Destinations
Bering Air	Deering, Kotzebue

== See also ==
- List of airports in Alaska
