= Point Hope Airport =

Airport in Alaska

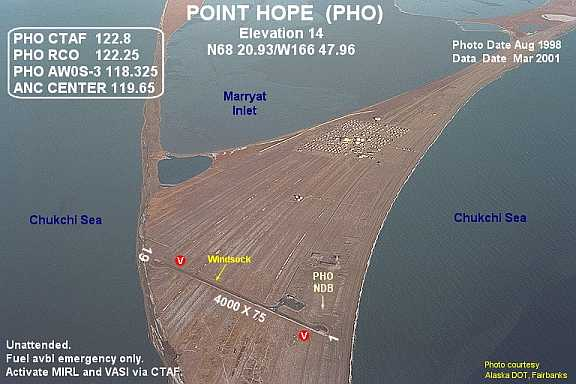
- IATA: PHO; ICAO: PAPO; FAA LID: PHO

Summary
- Airport type: Public
- Owner: State of Alaska DOT&PF - Northern Region
- Serves: Point Hope, Alaska
- Elevation AMSL: 12 ft / 4 m
- Coordinates: 68°20′56″N 166°47′58″W

Map
- Location of Point Hope Airport

Runways
Direction	Length		Surface
Direction	ft	m	Surface
1/19	4,000	1,219	Asphalt
- Source: Federal Aviation Administration

Point Hope Airport (IATA: PHO, ICAO: PAPO, FAA LID: PHO) is a state-owned public-use airport located two miles (3 km) southwest of the central business district of Point Hope, a city in the North Slope Borough of the U.S. state of Alaska. Point Hope is located in the Lisburne Peninsula, on the Chukchi Sea coast.

== Facilities ==
Point Hope Airport covers an area of 22 acres (8.9 ha) and contains one asphalt paved runway designated 1/19 which measures 4,000 x 75 ft (1,219 x 23 m).

As per Federal Aviation Administration records, the airport had 4,580 commercial passenger boardings (enplanements) in calendar year 2005 and 4,900 enplanements (4,359 scheduled and 541 unscheduled) in 2006. According to the FAA's National Plan of Integrated Airport Systems for 2007–2011, it is classified as commercial service - non-primary because it has between 2,500 and 10,000 passenger boardings per year.

== Airlines and destinations ==
In July 2022, a realignment plan was submitted as the north shore of the Lisburne Peninsula – the land where Point Hope Airport is located, has recorded an erosion rate of 8-10 feet annually. The northern end of the Runway Safety Area (RSA) has already been removed and only 20 feet of RSA is available beyond the runway threshold. Construction is expected to start July 2023 and completion of the project set for July 2024.

Airlines	Destinations
Bering Air	Cape Lisburne, Kivalina, Kotzebue

== See also ==
- List of airports in Alaska
