= Deering Airport =

Airport in Alaska, United States

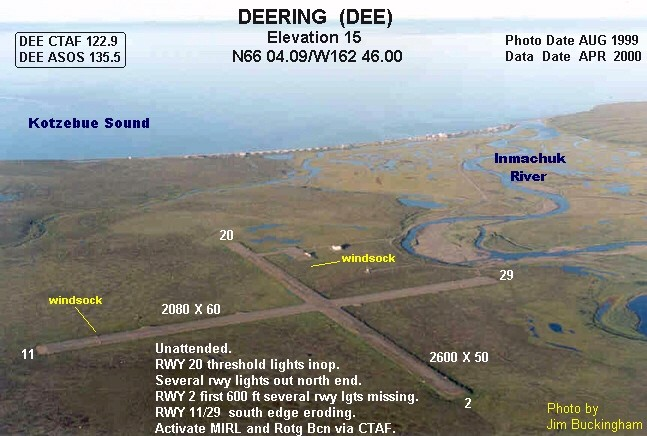
- IATA: DRG; ICAO: PADE; FAA LID: DEE

Summary
- Airport type: Public
- Owner: State of Alaska DOT&PF - Northern Region
- Serves: Deering, Alaska
- Elevation AMSL: 21 ft (6.4 m)
- Coordinates: 66°04′10″N 162°45′59″W

Map
- Location of airport in Alaska

Runways
Direction	Length		Surface
Direction	ft	m	Surface
3/21	3,320	1,012	Gravel
12/30	2,660	811	Gravel

Statistics (2016)
- Aircraft operations: 3,500 (2014)
- Based aircraft: 0
- Passengers: 2,403
- Freight: 727,000 lbs
- Source: Federal Aviation Administration; Source: Bureau of Transportation

Deering Airport (IATA: DRG, ICAO: PADE, FAA LID: DEE) (Iñupiaq: Ipnatchiam Mirvia) is a state-owned public-use airport located two nautical miles (3.7 km) southwest of the central business district of Deering, a city in the Northwest Arctic Borough of the U.S. state of Alaska.

Although most U.S. airports use the same three-letter location identifier for the FAA and IATA, this airport is assigned DEE by the FAA and DRG by the IATA. The airport's ICAO identifier is PADE.

== Facilities ==
Deering Airport covers an area of 262 acres (106 ha) at an elevation of 21 feet (6 m) above mean sea level. It has two gravel surfaced runways: 2/20 measures 3,300 by 75 feet (1,006 x 23 m) and 11/29 is 2,640 by 75 feet (805 x 23 m).

== Airlines and destinations ==
Airlines	Destinations
Bering Air	Buckland, Kotzebue, Nome
Ryan Air	Buckland, Point Hope

=== Statistics ===
Carrier shares: January – December 2016
Carrier	Passengers (arriving and departing)
Bering	1,620(67.25%)
Hageland	790(32.75%)

Top domestic destinations: January – December 2016
Rank	City	Airport	Passengers
1	(Alaska) Kotzebue, AK	Ralph Wien Memorial Airport	1,000
2	(Alaska) Buckland, AK	Buckland Airport	180
3	(Alaska) Nome, AK	Nome Airport	10

== See also ==
- List of airports in Alaska
