= DRG =

DRG may refer to:

== Arts and media ==
- DRG Records, an American label
- DRG London, a radio multiplex
- Deep Rock Galactic, a 2020 co-operative shooter game
- Digital raster graphic, a scan of a map

== Biology and medicine ==
- Dorsal respiratory group, a nerve group
- Dorsal root ganglion, a spinal neuron cluster
- Diagnosis-related group, in healthcare

== Transport ==
- Deering Airport, Alaska, US
- Denver and Rio Grande Railroad, Western US, 1870–1992
- Deutsche Reichsbahn-Gesellschaft, a German rail operator, 1924–1937
  - DRG locomotive classification
- Drayton Green railway station, London (opened 1901)

== Other uses ==
- Democratic Republic of Georgia, 1918–1921
- Dickinson Robinson Group, a British stationery manufacturer, 1966–1996
- Rusich Group, a Russian neo-Nazi paramilitary (formed 2014; formally Diversionno-shturmovaya razvedyvatel'naya gruppa)
- Diversionary-Reconnaissance Group (диверсио́нно-разве́дывательная гру́ппа), a more general Russian and Ukrainian acronym often translated to English as "sabotage and reconnaissance group"
- Rungus, a dialect of the Momogun language, ISO 639-3 code drg
