= Noatak Airport =

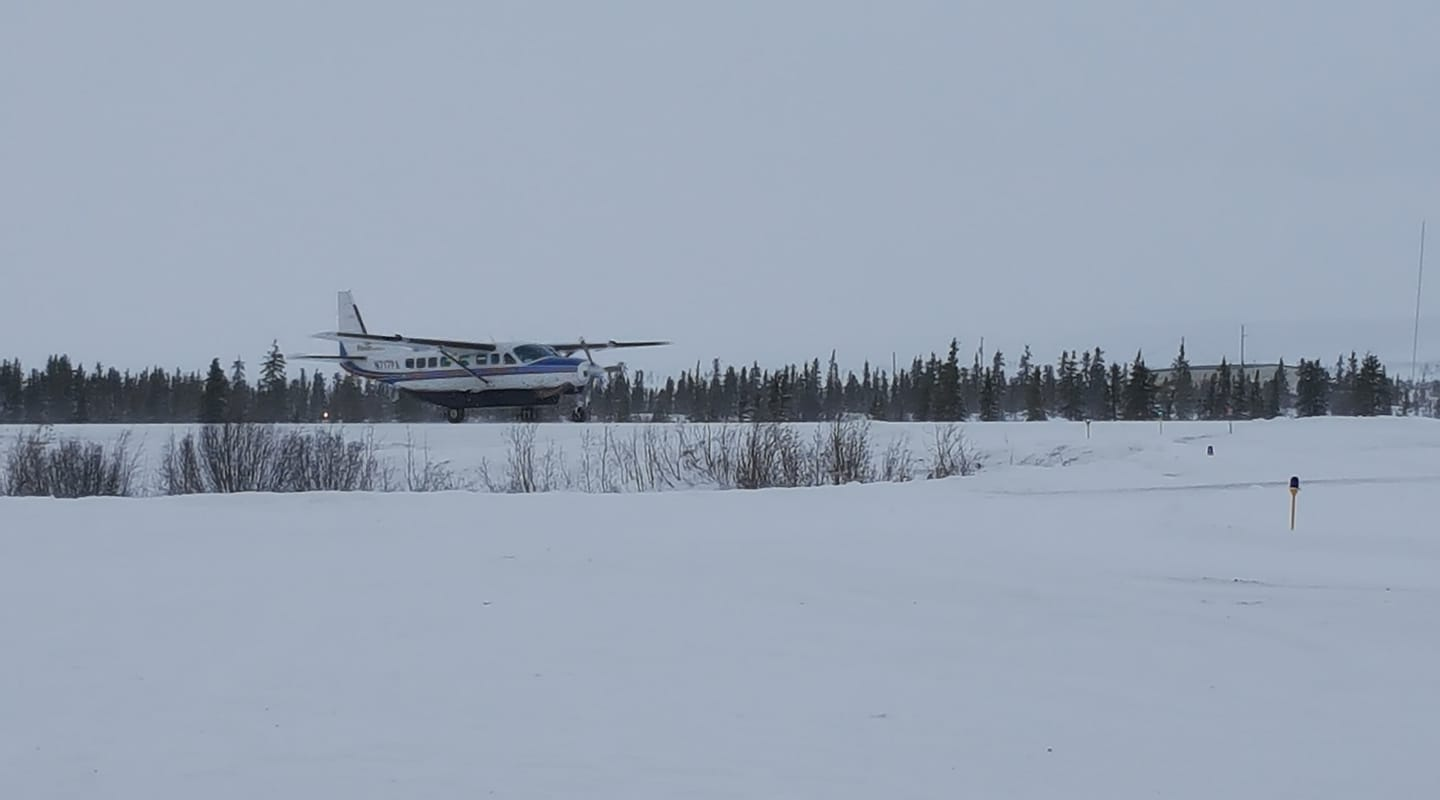
- IATA: WTK; ICAO: PAWN; FAA LID: WTK

Summary
- Airport type: Public
- Owner: Alaska DOT&PF - Northern Region
- Location: Noatak, Alaska
- Elevation AMSL: 88 ft / 27 m
- Coordinates: 67°33′40″N 162°58′49″W

Map
- Location of airport in Alaska

Runways
Direction	Length		Surface
Direction	ft	m	Surface
1/19	4,000	1,219	Gravel
- Source: Federal Aviation Administration

Noatak Airport (IATA: WTK, ICAO: PAWN, FAA LID: WTK) (Iñupiaq: Nuataam Mirvia) is a state-owned public-use airport located one nautical mile (1.85 km) southwest of the central business district of Noatak, in the Northwest Arctic Borough of the U.S. state in Alaska.

== Facilities ==
Noatak Airport has one runway designated 1/19 with a gravel surface measuring 4,000 by 60 feet (1,219 x 18 m).

== Airlines and destinations ==
Airlines	Destinations
Bering Air	Kivalina, Kotzebue
Ryan Air	Kotzebue

== See also ==
- List of airports in Alaska
