= Robert (Bob) Curtis Memorial Airport =

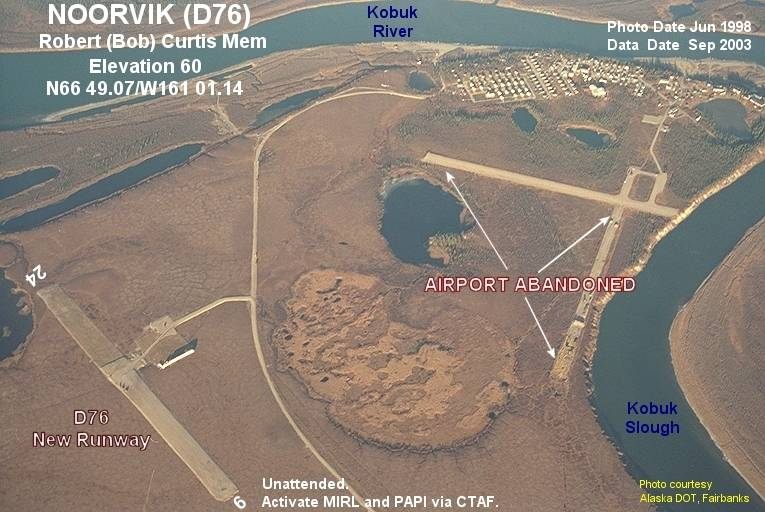
- IATA: ORV; ICAO: PFNO; FAA LID: D76

Summary
- Airport type: Public
- Owner: State of Alaska DOT&PF - Northern Region
- Serves: Noorvik, Alaska
- Elevation AMSL: 55 ft / 17 m
- Coordinates: 66°49′03″N 161°01′20″W

Map
- Location of airport in Alaska

Runways
Direction	Length		Surface
Direction	ft	m	Surface
6/24	4,000	1,219	Gravel

Statistics
- Enplanements (2007): 6,523
- Source: Federal Aviation Administration

Robert (Bob) Curtis Memorial Airport (IATA: ORV, ICAO: PFNO, FAA LID: D76) is a state-owned public-use airport located one nautical mile (1.8 km) north of the central business district of Noorvik, a village in the Northwest Arctic Borough of the U.S. state of Alaska.

As per Federal Aviation Administration records, this airport had 6,523 passenger boardings (enplanements) in calendar year 2007, a decrease of 5% from the 6,884 enplanements in 2006.

== Facilities ==
Robert (Bob) Curtis Memorial Airport covers an area of 311 acres (126 ha) at an elevation of 55 feet (17 m) above mean sea level. It has one runway (6/24) with a gravel surface measuring 4,000 by 100 feet (1,219 by 30 m).

== Airlines and destinations ==
Airlines	Destinations
Bering Air	Kiana, Kotzebue

== See also ==
- List of airports in Alaska
