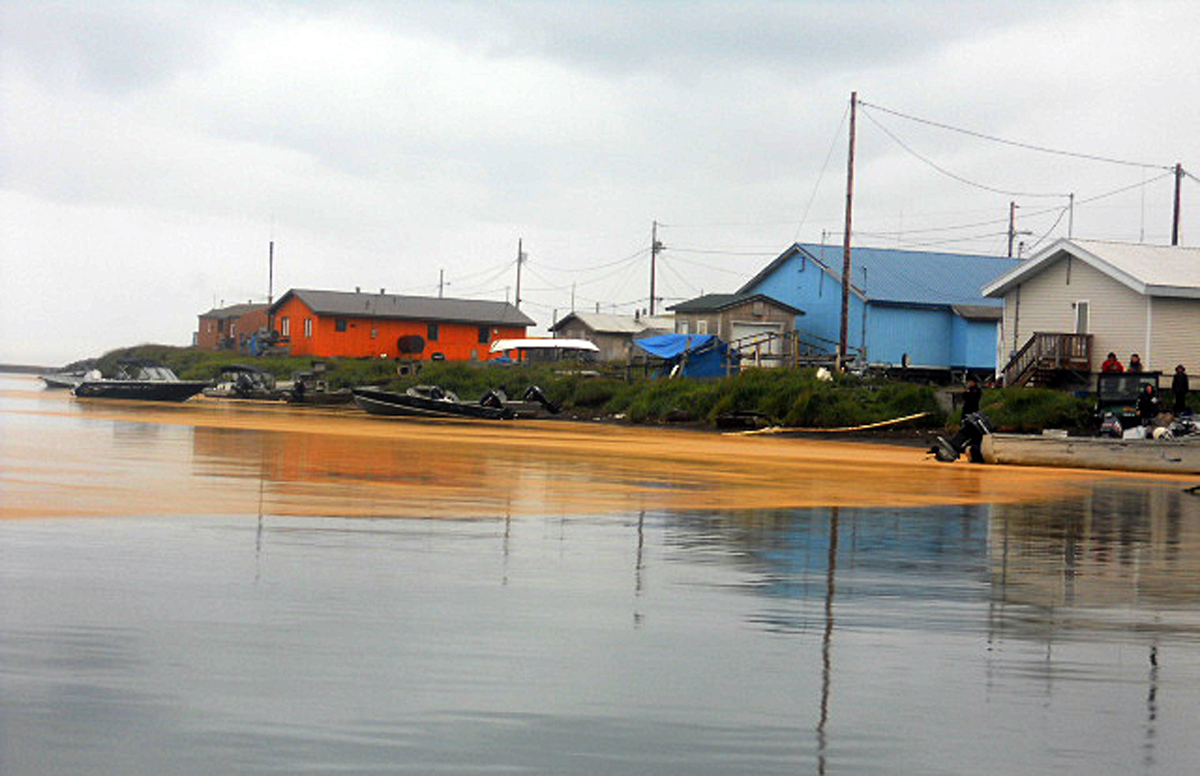
- Chrysomyxa ledicola as "orange goo" in Kivalina, Alaska

Scientific classification
- Domain: Eukaryota
- Kingdom: Fungi
- Division: Basidiomycota
- Class: Pucciniomycetes
- Order: Pucciniales
- Family: Coleosporiaceae
- Genus: Chrysomyxa
- Species: C. ledicola

Binomial name
- Chrysomyxa ledicola Lagerh. 1893

= Chrysomyxa ledicola =

Species of fungus

Chrysomyxa ledicola is a plant pathogen responsible for the disease large-spored spruce-Labrador tea rust. It affects white spruce, black spruce, Sitka spruce, Engelmann spruce, and Labrador-tea. It is also the cause of the orange goo that covered the Iñupiat village of Kivalina, Alaska in the summer of 2011.
