= Ralph Wien Memorial Airport =

Airport serving Kotzebue, Alaska, United States

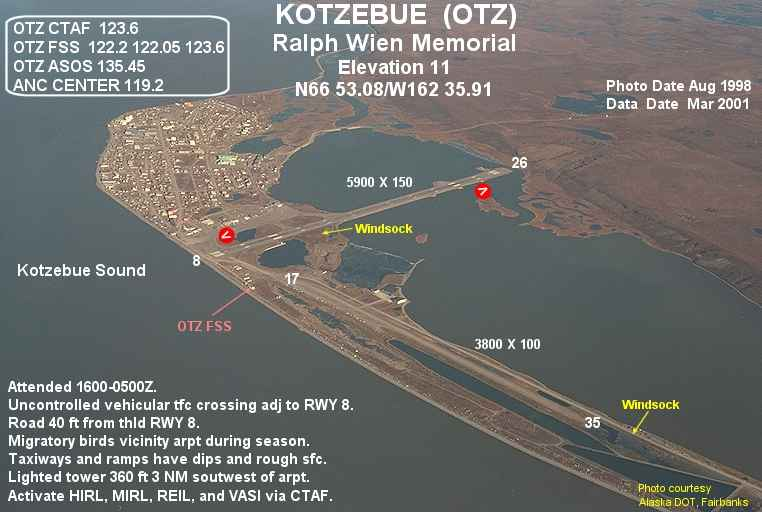
- IATA: OTZ; ICAO: PAOT; FAA LID: OTZ

Summary
- Airport type: Public
- Owner: Alaska DOT&PF - Northern Region
- Serves: Kotzebue, Alaska
- Elevation AMSL: 14 ft / 4 m
- Coordinates: 66°53′05″N 162°35′55″W

Map

Runways
Direction	Length		Surface
Direction	ft	m	Surface
9/27	6,300	1,920	Asphalt
17/35	3,876	1,181	Gravel

Statistics (2014)
- Aircraft operations: 60,000
- Based aircraft: 43
- Source: Federal Aviation Administration

Ralph Wien Memorial Airport (IATA: OTZ, ICAO: PAOT, FAA LID: OTZ) is a state-owned public-use airport located on the south side of Kotzebue, a city on the Baldwin Peninsula in the Northwest Arctic Borough of the U.S. state of Alaska.

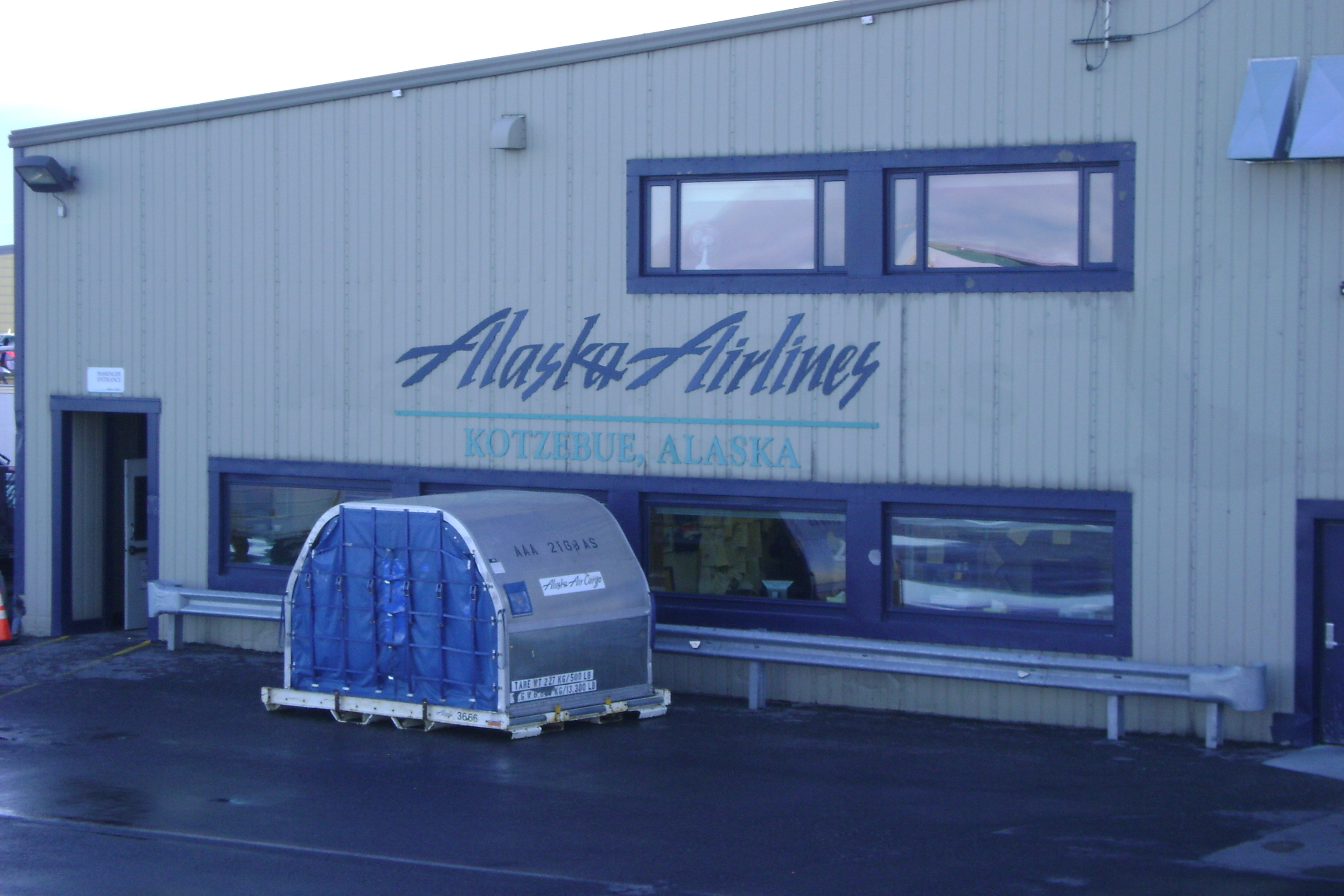
Kotzebue AK airport photographed from a Boeing 737-400 combo aircraft of Alaska Airlines

== Facilities and aircraft ==
Ralph Wien Memorial Airport covers an area of 1,480 acres (600 ha) which contains two runways. Runway 9/27 has an asphalt paved surface measuring 6,300 x 150 ft (1,920 x 46 m) and runway 18/36 has a gravel surface measuring 3,876 x 90 ft (1,181 x 27 m).

For the 12-month period ending April 11, 2008, the airport had 59,860 aircraft operations, an average of 164 per day: 62% general aviation, 33% air taxi, 3% scheduled commercial and 2% military. There are 52 aircraft based at this airport: 77% single engine and 23% multi-engine.

== Airlines and destinations ==
Airlines	Destinations
Alaska Airlines	Anchorage
Bering Air	Ambler, Buckland, Cape Lisburne, Deering, Kiana, Kivalina, Kobuk, Noatak, Nome, Noorvik, Point Hope, Selawik, Shungnak

== Statistics ==
Busiest Domestic Routes from OTZ (July 2024 – June 2025)
Rank	City	Passengers	Airline
1	Anchorage, Alaska	33,410	Alaska
2	Point Hope, Alaska	3,490	Bering
3	Selawik, Alaska	3,290	Bering
4	Buckland, Alaska	2,920	Bering
5	Noatak, Alaska	2,840	Bering
6	Noorvik, Alaska	2,720	Bering
7	Kivalina, Alaska	2,190	Bering
8	Kiana, Alaska	1,930	Bering
9	Ambler, Alaska	1,200	Bering
10	Shungnak, Alaska	1,160	Bering

Largest airlines at OME (July 2024 – June 2025)
Carrier	Passengers (arriving and departing)
Bering Air	47,670(41.48%)
Alaska Airlines	37,000(32.20%)
Horizon Air	30,240(26.31%)

== Ralph Wien, pilot ==
The airport is named in memory of Ralph Wien, a native of Lake Nebagamon, Wisconsin, born in 1897. He and his younger brother Noel Wien, arrived in Alaska in 1924 and together founded Wien Air Alaska, the first airline in Alaska. He died when the Bellanca aircraft he was flying crashed in full view of onlookers in Kotzebue on Columbus Day, 1930. Fr. Philip Delon, Superior general of Alaskan Catholic missions, and Fr. William Walsh, a diocesan priest from Oakland, California, who were on board, also died in the accident.

The airport was dedicated in 1951 by Governor Ernest Gruening.

== See also ==
- List of airports in Alaska
