= Selawik Airport =

- IATA: WLK; ICAO: PASK; FAA LID: WLK

Summary
- Airport type: Public
- Owner: Alaska DOT&PF - Northern Region
- Serves: Selawik, Alaska
- Elevation AMSL: 17 ft / 5 m
- Coordinates: 66°36′00″N 159°59′09″W

Map
- Location of airport in Alaska

Runways
| Direction | Length | | Surface |
| Direction | ft | m | Surface |
|---|---|---|---|
| 4/22 | 3,002 | 915 | Gravel |
| 9/27 | 2,659 | 810 | Gravel |
- Source: Federal Aviation Administration

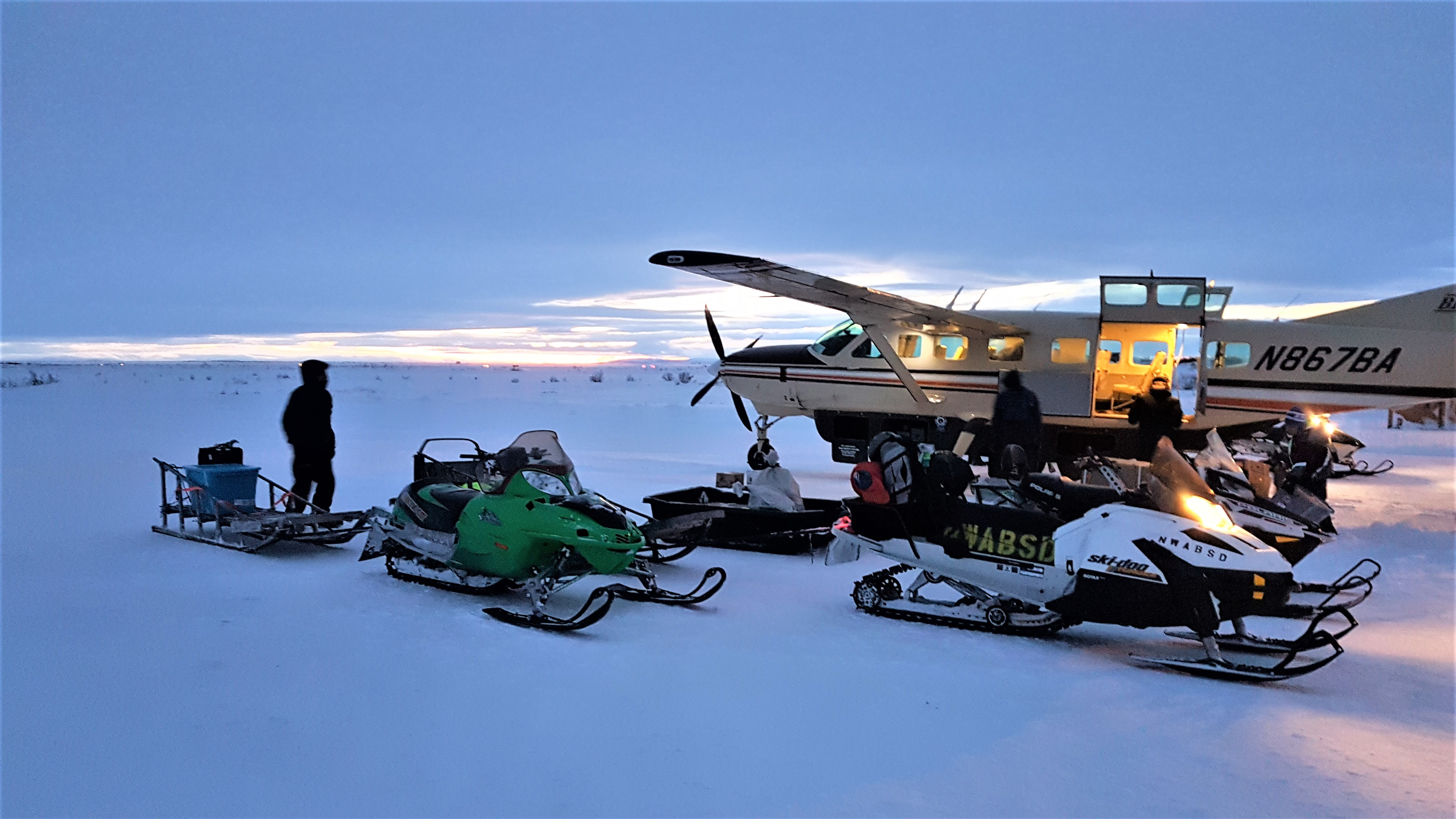
Bering Air at Selawik Airport

Selawik Airport (IATA: WLK, ICAO: PASK, FAA LID: WLK) is a state-owned public-use airport located in Selawik, a city in the Northwest Arctic Borough of the U.S. state of Alaska.

== Facilities ==
Selawik Airport has two gravel surfaced runways: 4/22 measuring: 3,002 x 60 ft (915 x 18 m) and 9/27 measuring 2,659 x 60 ft. (810 x 18 m).

== Airlines and destinations ==
| Airlines | Destinations |
|---|---|
| Bering Air | Kotzebue |

Selawik Airport Information

Origin Airport - Selawik

Origin Airport IATA Code - WLK

Origin City Name - Selawik

== See also ==
- List of airports in Alaska
