= Kukpuk River =

- Location of the mouth of the Kukpuk River in Alaska
- Native name: Kuukpak (Inupiaq)

Location
- Country: United States
- State: Alaska
- Borough: North Slope

Physical characteristics
- Source: De Long Mountains
  - coordinates: 68°19′27″N 163°24′54″W
  - elevation: 2,092 ft (638 m)
- Mouth: East end of Marryat Inlet
  - location: 12 miles (19 km) northeast of Point Hope, Chukchi Sea, Arctic Ocean
  - coordinates: 68°24′57″N 166°22′37″W
  - elevation: 0 ft (0 m)
- Length: 125 mi (201 km)

The Kukpuk River (Iñupiaq: Kuukpak) is a stream, about 125 miles (201 km) long, in the western North Slope Borough of the U.S. state of Alaska. It flows generally west from the De Long Mountains across the Lisburne Peninsula to Marryat Inlet on the Chukchi Sea. The river mouth is about 12 miles (19 km) northeast of Point Hope.

The Inuit name "Kuukpak" means "big river". A late 19th-century variant was "Kookpuk".

== See also ==
- List of rivers of Alaska
