= Bob Baker Memorial Airport =

- IATA: IAN; ICAO: PAIK; FAA LID: IAN

Summary
- Airport type: Public
- Owner: State of Alaska DOT&PF - Northern Region
- Location: Kiana, Alaska
- Elevation AMSL: 166 ft (51 m)
- Coordinates: 66°58′33″N 160°26′12″W

Map
- Location of airport in Alaska

Runways
Direction	Length		Surface
Direction	ft	m	Surface
6/24	3,400	1,036	Gravel
- Source: Federal Aviation Administration

Bob Baker Memorial Airport (IATA: IAN, ICAO: PAIK, FAA LID: IAN) is a public airport located one mile (2 km) north of the central business district of Kiana, a city in the Northwest Arctic Borough of the U.S. state of Alaska. The airport is state owned.

== Facilities ==
Bob Baker Memorial Airport has one gravel surfaced runway (6/24) measuring 3,400 x 100 ft. (1,036 x 30 m).

== Airlines and destinations ==
Airlines	Destinations
Bering Air	Kotzebue, Noorvik

== See also ==
- List of airports in Alaska
