= Elephant Point (Alaska) =

Coordinates: 66°15′32″N 161°20′05″W

Elephant Point (Iñupiaq: Siŋik) is a headland in Kotzebue Sound, Chukchi Sea in Northwest Arctic Borough, Alaska, United States.

It extends northeast into Eschscholtz Bay, 44 miles (71 km) southeast of Selawik.

This headland was named in 1826 by Royal Navy Captain Frederick William Beechey who wrote in his log: "I bestowed the name of Elephant upon the point, to mark its vicinity to the place where the fossils (bones of elephants) were found." Those bones probably belonged to mammoths.

A populated place named Elephant Point lies nearby.

== Demographics ==
Historical population
Census	Pop.	Note	%±
1950	108		—
U.S. Decennial Census

Elephant Point appeared once on the 1950 U.S. Census as an unincorporated village. It was also known as Buckland Post Office. Residents from Buckland relocated from there for a brief period before returning to that village.
