= Kivalina Airport =

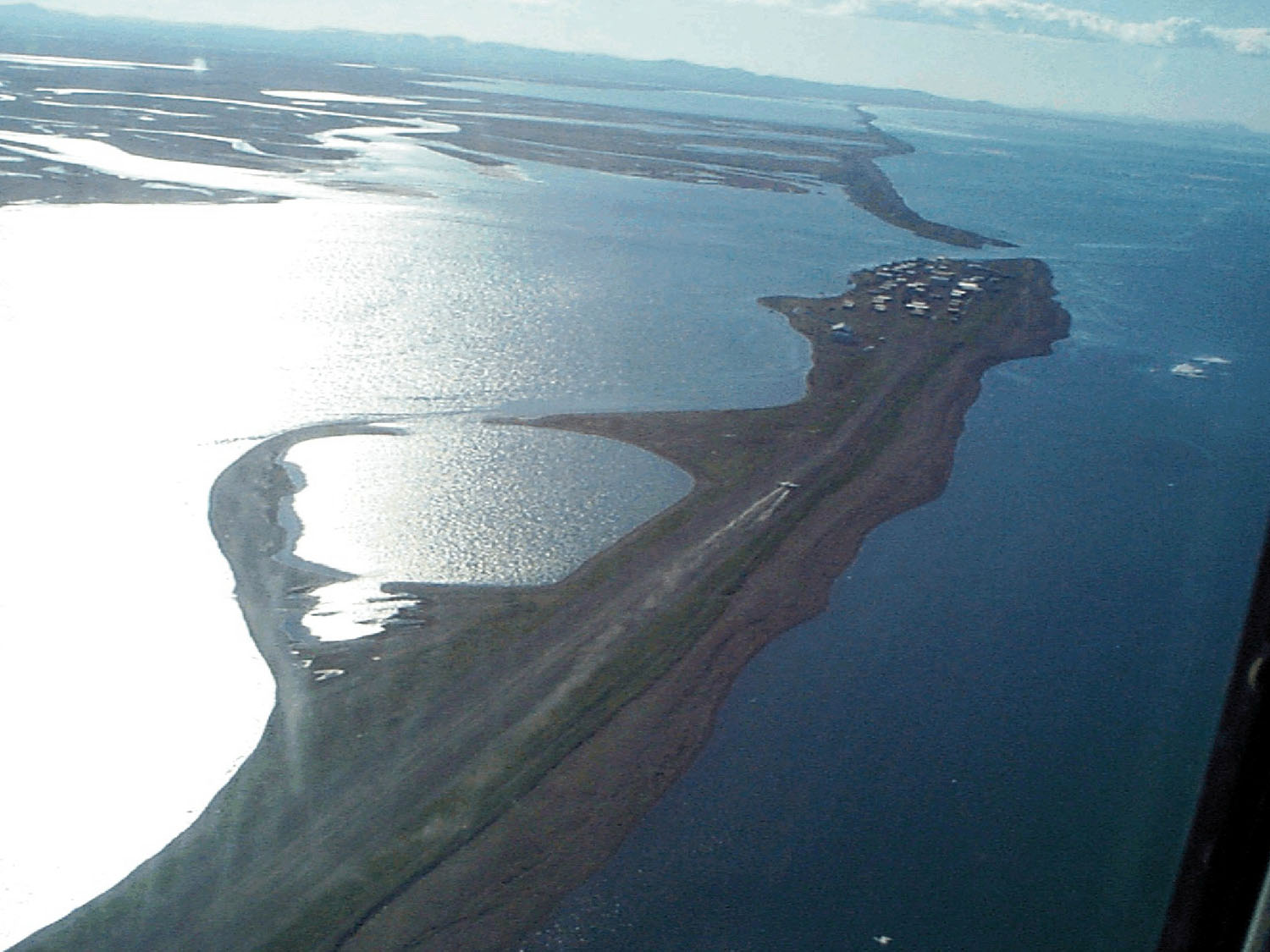
- IATA: KVL; ICAO: PAVL; FAA LID: KVL

Summary
- Airport type: Public
- Owner: State of Alaska DOT&PF - Northern Region
- Location: Kivalina, Alaska
- Elevation AMSL: 13 ft (4.0 m)
- Coordinates: 67°44′10″N 164°33′49″W

Map
- Location of airport in Alaska

Runways
Direction	Length		Surface
Direction	ft	m	Surface
12/30	3,000	914	Gravel
- Source: Federal Aviation Administration

Kivalina Airport (IATA: KVL, ICAO: PAVL, FAA LID: KVL) is a state-owned public-use airport located in Kivalina, a city in the Northwest Arctic Borough of the U.S. state of Alaska. Kivalina Airport provides air transportation for residents and connects the community to regional hubs like Kotzebue and other parts of Alaska.

== Facilities ==
Kivalina Airport has one runway (12/30) with a gravel surface measuring 3,000 x 60 ft. (914 x 18 m).

== Airlines and destinations ==
Airlines	Destinations
Bering Air	Kotzebue
Ryan Air	Noatak

== See also ==
- List of airports in Alaska
