= Lisburne Peninsula =

Peninsula in northwest Alaska, US

Coordinates: 68°30′N 165°15′W

The Lisburne Peninsula is a peninsula jutting out into the Chukchi Sea on the western coast of the U.S. state of Alaska. It is located at the westernmost point of the North Slope Borough. It is roughly trapezoid-shaped, having two points, the northwestern one being Cape Lisburne and the southwestern one Point Hope. It is limited on its eastern side by the De Long Mountains. Lat 683000N Long 1651500W

The Lisburne Peninsula extends W, 100 km (62 mi), from a line between Cape Beaufort and Kivalina, into the Chukchi Sea. It separates Alaska's North Slope from the Kotzebue Sound. It is named for Cape Lisburne. Two sections of the Chukchi Sea unit of the Alaska Maritime National Wildlife Refuge are located on the peninsula, one at Cape Lisburne and the other at Cape Thompson.

The Kukpuk River flows through the Lisburne Peninsula.
