= Wevok, Alaska =

- Unincorporated area
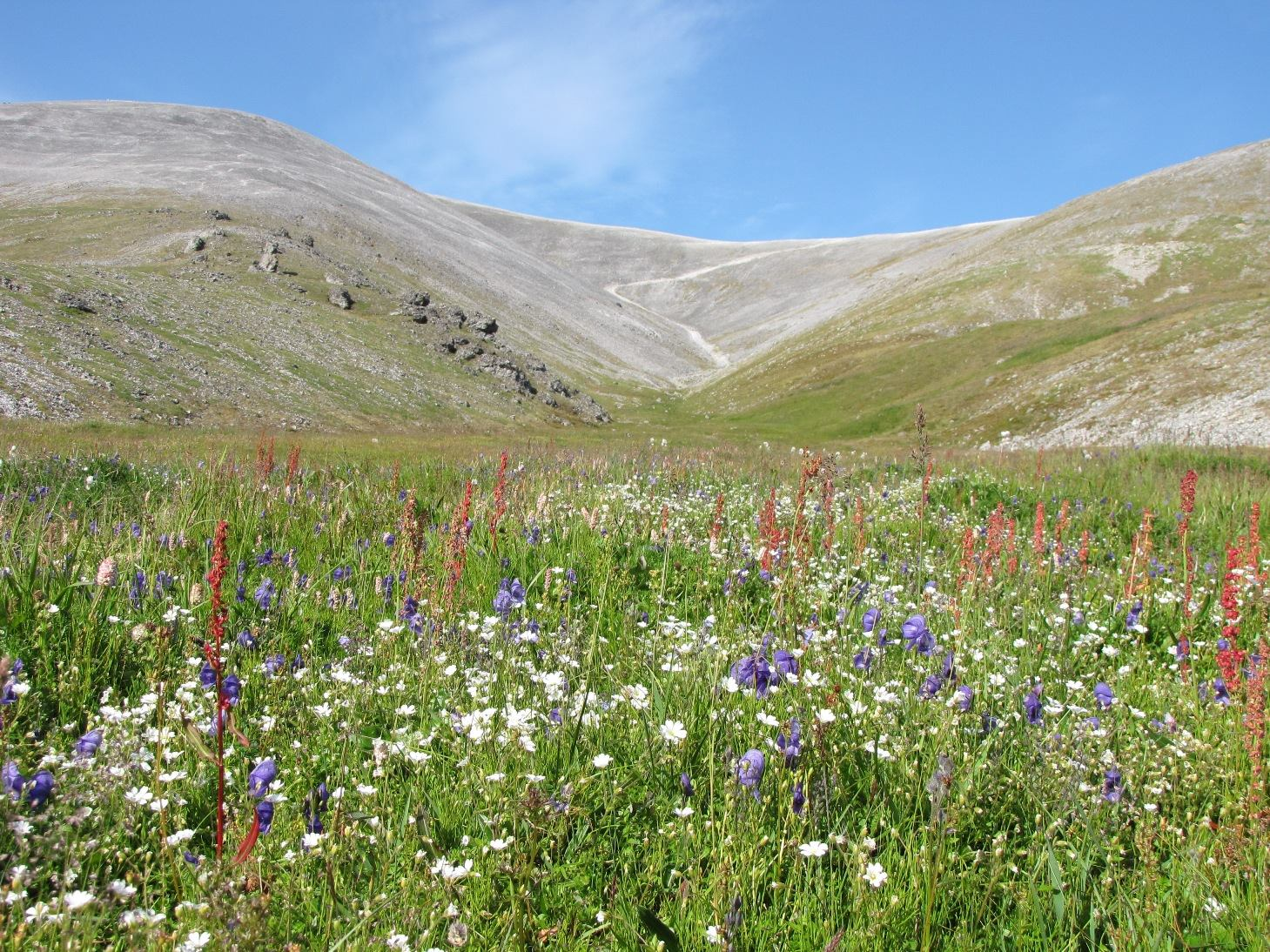
- Wildflowers on Cape Lisburne

- Location within the state of Alaska
- Coordinates: 68°52′19″N 166°5′25″W
- Country: United States
- State: Alaska
- Borough: North Slope

Government
  - Borough mayor: Harry K. Brower, Jr.
  - State senator: Donny Olson (D)
  - State rep.: John Lincoln (I)
- Elevation: 56 ft (17 m)
- Time zone: UTC-9 (Alaska (AKST))
  - Summer (DST): UTC-8 (AKDT)

Wevok (Iñupiaq: Uivvaq) is a former Iñupiat village in the western part of North Slope Borough in the U.S. state of Alaska.

Its name is derived from the Iñupiat name of Cape Lisburne, which is 5 km (3.1 mi) to the west. Its maximum elevation is 17 m (56 ft).

== Demographics ==
Historical population
Census	Pop.	Note	%±
1880	13		—
U.S. Decennial Census

Wevok appeared once on the 1880 U.S. Census as "Cape Lisburne", an unincorporated Inuit village of 13 residents (all Inuit). The village did not report again in the census. The village was abandoned in the early 20th Century due to an illness that killed most of its inhabitants and a missionary worker, the survivors buried the dead in shallow graves and moved to the closest village of Point Hope.

Wevok has a weather station at nearby Cape Lisburne. Wevok's climate is a tundra climate (Köppen ET), as the average temperature in the hottest month is only around 45 °F (7 °C). Due to the influence of the Bering Sea and Chukchi Sea, the coldest months of the year are usually from February to March, and the warmest time of the year is from the end of July to the beginning of August.

Climate data for Cape Lisburne (1961–1990 normals, extremes 1954–1984)
Month	Jan	Feb	Mar	Apr	May	Jun	Jul	Aug	Sep	Oct	Nov	Dec	Year
Record high °F (°C)	41 (5)	45 (7)	44 (7)	46 (8)	54 (12)	65 (18)	73 (23)	74 (23)	64 (18)	57 (14)	42 (6)	47 (8)	74 (23)
Mean maximum °F (°C)	34.2 (1.2)	22.4 (−5.3)	26.1 (−3.3)	32.3 (0.2)	45.8 (7.7)	58.1 (14.5)	65.5 (18.6)	62.1 (16.7)	52.0 (11.1)	40.1 (4.5)	34.3 (1.3)	29.7 (−1.3)	66.6 (19.2)
Mean daily maximum °F (°C)	3.8 (−15.7)	−3.1 (−19.5)	−0.7 (−18.2)	10.4 (−12.0)	29.4 (−1.4)	42.4 (5.8)	49.4 (9.7)	48.5 (9.2)	40.0 (4.4)	26.5 (−3.1)	13.4 (−10.3)	4.4 (−15.3)	22.2 (−5.4)
Daily mean °F (°C)	−0.7 (−18.2)	−8.7 (−22.6)	−6.0 (−21.1)	4.7 (−15.2)	25.4 (−3.7)	37.9 (3.3)	45.3 (7.4)	45.2 (7.3)	37.5 (3.1)	22.7 (−5.2)	10.0 (−12.2)	−0.8 (−18.2)	17.7 (−7.9)
Mean daily minimum °F (°C)	−6.9 (−21.6)	−13.0 (−25.0)	−10.5 (−23.6)	-0.0 (−17.8)	20.6 (−6.3)	33.4 (0.8)	40.5 (4.7)	41.4 (5.2)	34.4 (1.3)	20.1 (−6.6)	5.5 (−14.7)	−4.5 (−20.3)	13.5 (−10.3)
Mean minimum °F (°C)	−28.1 (−33.4)	−29.7 (−34.3)	−27.2 (−32.9)	−15.0 (−26.1)	7.4 (−13.7)	26.1 (−3.3)	32.1 (0.1)	34.1 (1.2)	25.4 (−3.7)	2.9 (−16.2)	−12.4 (−24.7)	−22.1 (−30.1)	−33.2 (−36.2)
Record low °F (°C)	−42 (−41)	−47 (−44)	−39 (−39)	−26 (−32)	−11 (−24)	20 (−7)	29 (−2)	29 (−2)	15 (−9)	−14 (−26)	−23 (−31)	−40 (−40)	−47 (−44)
Average precipitation inches (mm)	0.44 (11)	0.27 (6.9)	0.23 (5.8)	0.34 (8.6)	0.38 (9.7)	0.70 (18)	1.82 (46)	2.25 (57)	1.81 (46)	1.13 (29)	0.64 (16)	0.33 (8.4)	10.33 (262)
Average snowfall inches (cm)	4.4 (11)	2.4 (6.1)	2.2 (5.6)	3.6 (9.1)	2.0 (5.1)	0.8 (2.0)	0.1 (0.25)	0.2 (0.51)	2.8 (7.1)	9.0 (23)	6.5 (17)	2.9 (7.4)	36.9 (94)
Average precipitation days (≥ 0.01 inch)	8.8	4.8	4.4	6.5	6.8	6.7	11.2	15.1	13.9	12.7	9.7	6.1	106.7
Average snowy days (≥ 0.1 inch)	8.8	4.5	5.2	7.7	4.6	1.5	0.2	0.4	3.7	12.8	10.1	6.7	66.2
Source 1: WRCC
Source 2: XMACIS (snowfall)
