= Cape Lisburne =

Cape in Alaska, United States

Coordinates: 68°52′52″N 166°12′36″W

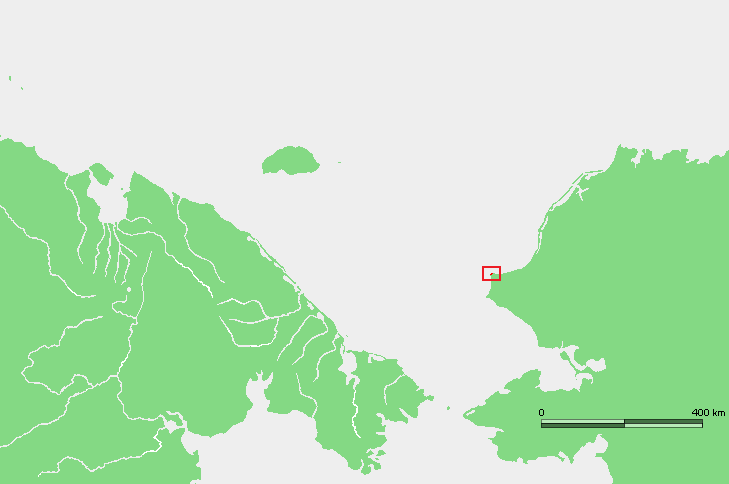
Location of Cape Lisburne

Cape Lisburne (Iñupiaq: Uivvaq) is a cape located at the northwest point of the Lisburne Peninsula on the Chukchi Sea coast in Alaska. It is 40 miles (64 km) northeast of the village of Point Hope, part of the Arctic Slope. It is a part of the Chukchi Sea unit of Alaska Maritime National Wildlife Refuge. It is the northwesternmost point of land in Alaska, North America, and based on the International Date Line (Note: The 180th meridian bisects Russia's Wrangel Island, making its north shore at that longitude both the northwesternmost point and northeasternmost point of land in the world on that metric.) the world.

== History ==
The first European to sight this cape was James Cook. It is unclear who named it. On August 21, 1778, he wrote: "The southern extreme seemed to form a point which was named Cape", followed by a blank for the name. Someone added the word Lisburne, but it is not in Cook's handwriting.

An early Inupiaq name for the cape was "Uivvaq", generally spelled "Wevok" or "Wevuk". Cape Lisburne was often referred to as "Uivvaq Uŋasiktuq" meaning "distant cape" as opposed to "Uivvaq Qanittuq" (Cape Thompson) meaning "near cape".

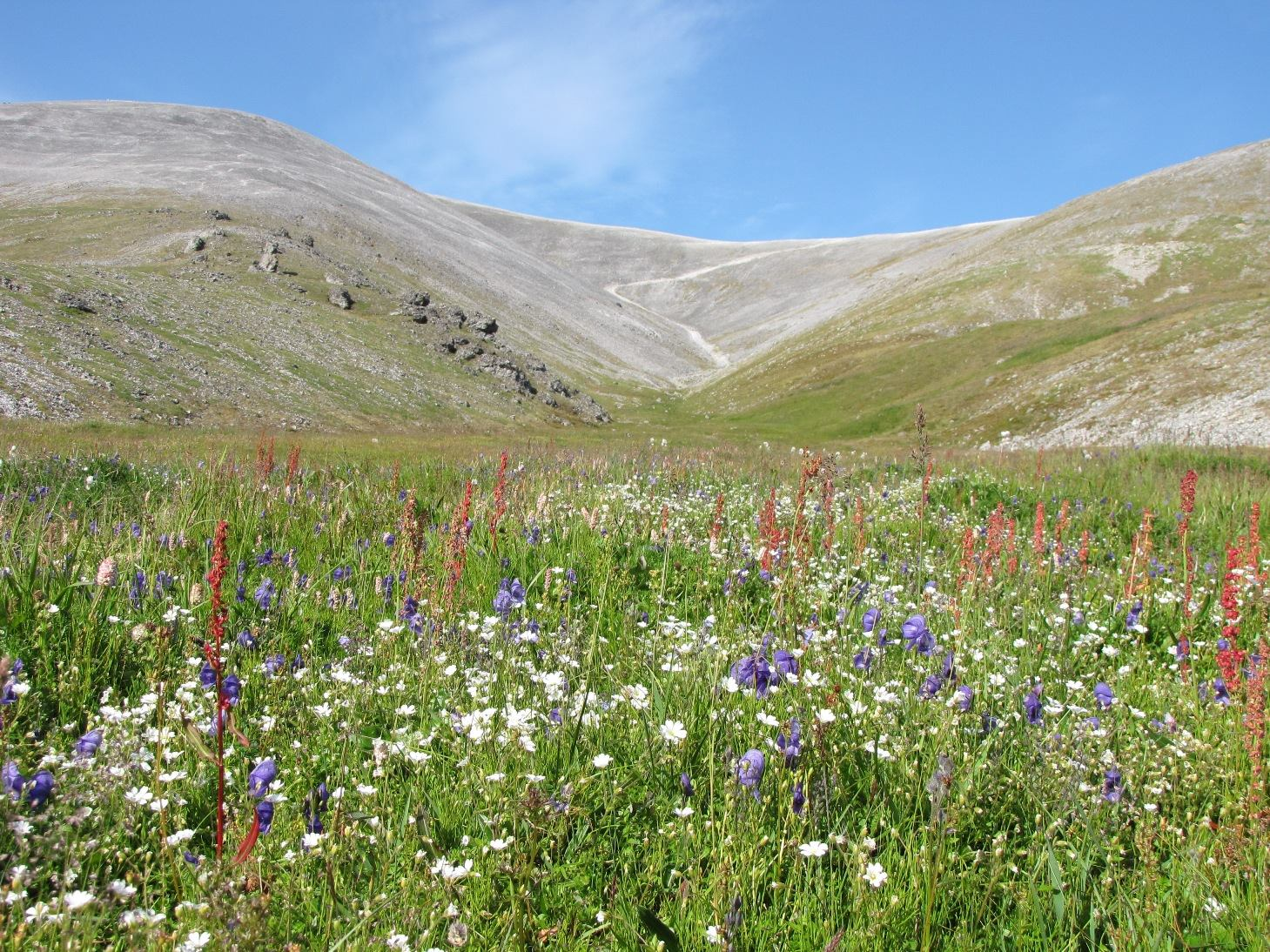
Wildflowers on Cape Lisburne

The native Inupiaq who lived there were struck by a deadly epidemic and many died along with an Episcopal missionary named John Driggs.

From 1951 to 1983, the United States Air Force maintained a long-range radar and communication facility at Cape Lisburne Air Force Station that was part of the DEW Line network of radar sites along the Alaska North Slope. The Pacific Air Forces Regional Support Center maintains the radar installation today.

Climate data for Cape Lisburne, Alaska, 1954–1984 normals and extremes
Month	Jan	Feb	Mar	Apr	May	Jun	Jul	Aug	Sep	Oct	Nov	Dec	Year
Record high °F (°C)	41 (5)	45 (7)	44 (7)	46 (8)	54 (12)	65 (18)	73 (23)	74 (23)	64 (18)	57 (14)	42 (6)	47 (8)	74 (23)
Mean maximum °F (°C)	33.0 (0.6)	23.0 (−5.0)	26.6 (−3.0)	33.2 (0.7)	45.5 (7.5)	57.7 (14.3)	65.6 (18.7)	61.3 (16.3)	51.7 (10.9)	40.1 (4.5)	31.9 (−0.1)	28.5 (−1.9)	66.4 (19.1)
Mean daily maximum °F (°C)	4.6 (−15.2)	−4.2 (−20.1)	−0.7 (−18.2)	11.2 (−11.6)	30.1 (−1.1)	42.5 (5.8)	49.8 (9.9)	48.5 (9.2)	40.1 (4.5)	26.1 (−3.3)	12.7 (−10.7)	2.6 (−16.3)	21.9 (−5.6)
Daily mean °F (°C)	−1.1 (−18.4)	−9.3 (−22.9)	−5.9 (−21.1)	5.8 (−14.6)	25.8 (−3.4)	38.0 (3.3)	45.2 (7.3)	44.9 (7.2)	37.3 (2.9)	23.0 (−5.0)	8.8 (−12.9)	−0.9 (−18.3)	17.6 (−8.0)
Mean daily minimum °F (°C)	−6.8 (−21.6)	−14.3 (−25.7)	−11.1 (−23.9)	0.4 (−17.6)	21.5 (−5.8)	33.5 (0.8)	40.5 (4.7)	41.3 (5.2)	34.4 (1.3)	19.8 (−6.8)	4.8 (−15.1)	−6.4 (−21.3)	13.1 (−10.5)
Mean minimum °F (°C)	−29.3 (−34.1)	−30.3 (−34.6)	−28.3 (−33.5)	−15.6 (−26.4)	7.8 (−13.4)	26.4 (−3.1)	32.2 (0.1)	33.9 (1.1)	24.5 (−4.2)	3.8 (−15.7)	−12.5 (−24.7)	−23.7 (−30.9)	−34.3 (−36.8)
Record low °F (°C)	−42 (−41)	−47 (−44)	−39 (−39)	−26 (−32)	−11 (−24)	20 (−7)	29 (−2)	29 (−2)	15 (−9)	−14 (−26)	−23 (−31)	−40 (−40)	−47 (−44)
Average precipitation inches (mm)	0.51 (13)	0.28 (7.1)	0.26 (6.6)	0.39 (9.9)	0.35 (8.9)	0.63 (16)	1.96 (50)	2.74 (70)	2.01 (51)	1.11 (28)	0.77 (20)	0.33 (8.4)	11.34 (288.9)
Average snowfall inches (cm)	5.0 (13)	2.9 (7.4)	2.9 (7.4)	3.7 (9.4)	1.9 (4.8)	0.6 (1.5)	0.5 (1.3)	0.4 (1.0)	3.4 (8.6)	9.2 (23)	7.3 (19)	3.5 (8.9)	41.3 (105.3)
Source: WRCC
