= Noatak, Alaska =

Place in Alaska, United States

Noatak Inupiaq: Nuataaq
- CDP
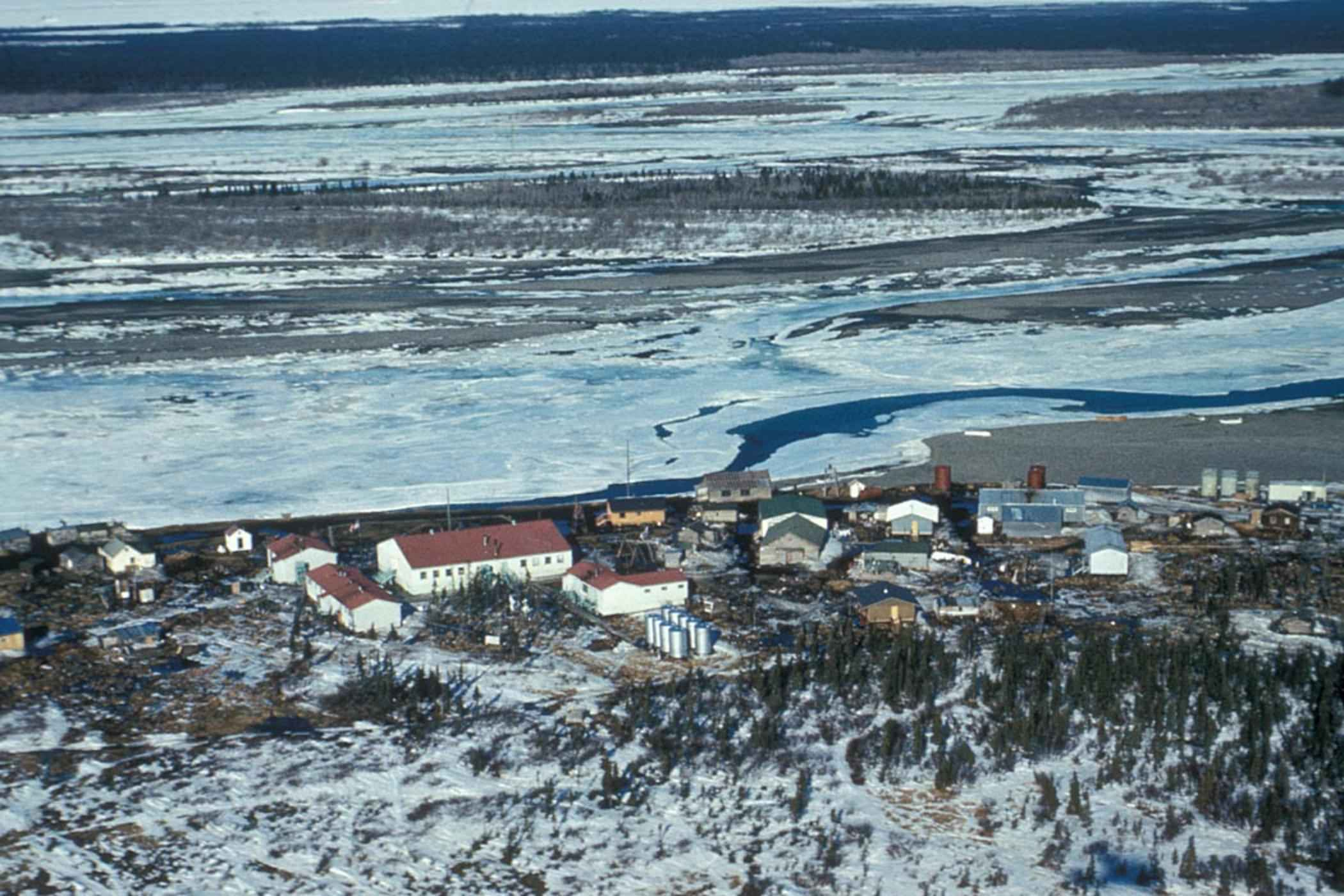
- Aerial view of a portion of Noatak village

- Location in Northwest Arctic Borough and the state of Alaska.
- Coordinates: 67°34′19″N 162°58′30″W
- Country: United States
- State: Alaska
- Borough: Northwest Arctic

Government
  - Borough mayor: Dickie Moto
  - State senator: Donny Olson (D)
  - State rep.: Robyn Burke (D)

Area
  - Total: 16.85 sq mi (43.65 km^{2})
  - Land: 16.03 sq mi (41.52 km^{2})
  - Water: 0.82 sq mi (2.13 km^{2})

Population (2020)
  - Total: 570
  - Density: 35.6/sq mi (13.73/km^{2})
- Time zone: UTC-9 (Alaska (AKST))
  - Summer (DST): UTC-8 (AKDT)
- ZIP code: 99761
- Area code: 907
- FIPS code: 02-54700

Noatak (Inupiaq: Nuataaq) is a census-designated place (CDP) in the Northwest Arctic Borough in the U.S. state of Alaska. The population was 570 at the 2020 census, up from 514 in 2010. It is served by Noatak Airport.

== History ==
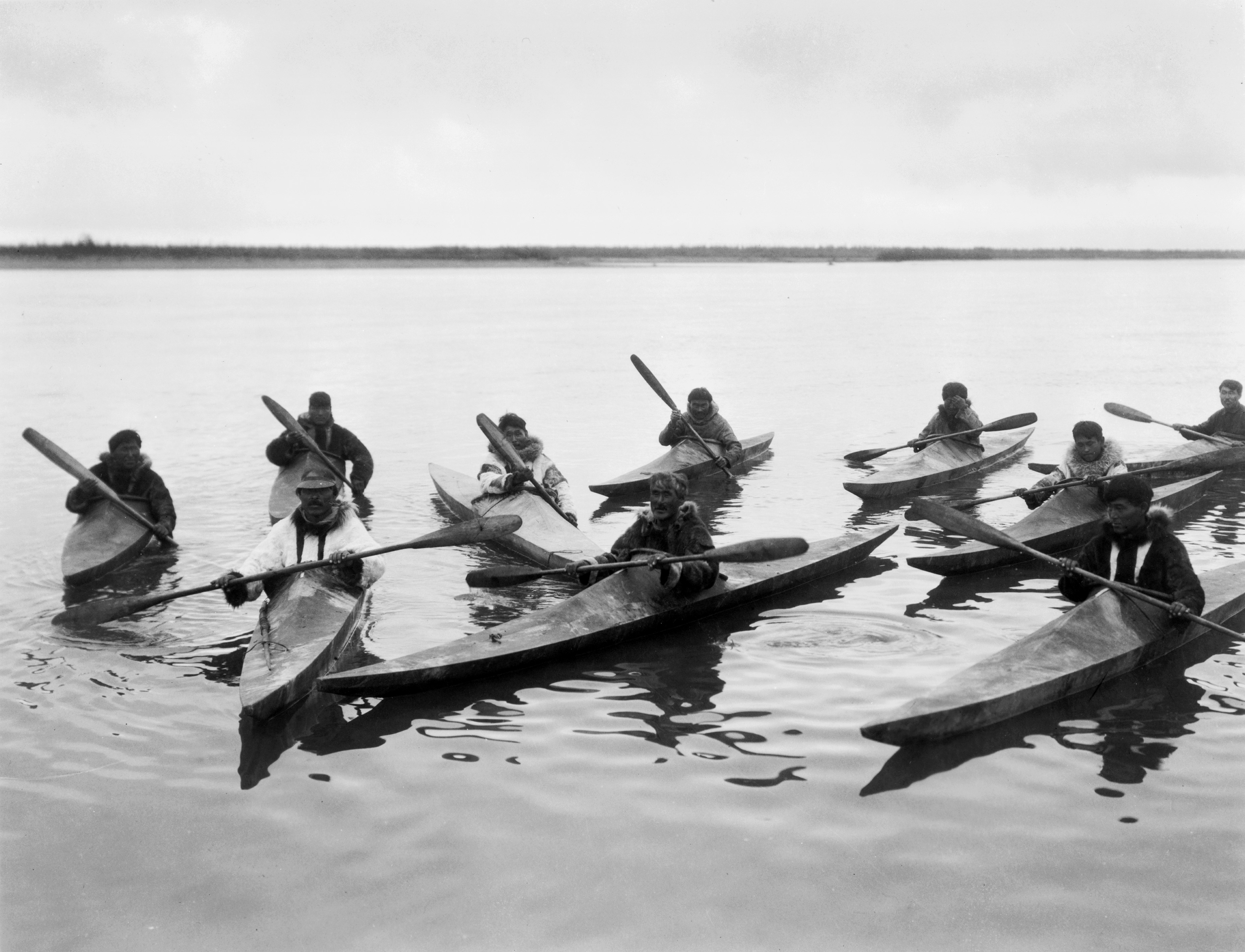
Inuit in kayaks, Noatak

Noatak was established as a fishing and hunting camp in the 1800s. Two identifiable groups of Inupiat resided on the Noatak River. The Nautaaġmiut (called "Noatagamut" in the 1880 census), Inupiaq for "inland river people", lived upriver, and the Napaaqtuġmiut, meaning "people of the trees", lived downriver. By the early 20th century, the missionaries Robert and Carrie Samms settled in what they called "Noatak". A United States post office was established in 1940.

== Geography ==
Noatak is located at 67°34′19″N 162°58′30″W (67.572031, -162.975085).

Noatak is located on the west bank of the Noatak River, 81 km (50 mi) north of Kotzebue. It is 102 km (63 mi) north of the Arctic Circle. Noatak village lies near the western boundary of the 6.6-million-acre (27,000 km^{2}) Noatak National Preserve and is the only settlement on the over 400-mile (640 km) long Noatak River.

According to the United States Census Bureau, the CDP has a total area of 12.2 square miles (32 km^{2}), of which, 11.6 square miles (30 km^{2}) of it is land and 0.7 square miles (1.8 km^{2}) of it (5.40%) is water.

== Demographics ==
Historical population
Census	Pop.	Note	%±
1880	400		—
1910	121		—
1920	164		35.5%
1930	212		29.3%
1940	336		58.5%
1950	326		−3.0%
1960	275		−15.6%
1970	293		6.5%
1980	273		−6.8%
1990	333		22.0%
2000	428		28.5%
2010	514		20.1%
2020	570		10.9%
U.S. Decennial Census

Noatak first appeared on the 1880 U.S. Census as an unincorporated Inuit village of "Noatagamute." All 400 of its residents were Inuit. It did not return again until 1910, this time as Noatak. It has returned on every successive census to date. It was made a census-designated place (CDP) in 1980.

As of the census of 2000, there were 428 people, 100 households, and 90 families residing in the CDP. The population density was 37.0 inhabitants per square mile (14.3/km^{2}). There were 106 housing units at an average density of 9.2 units per square mile (3.6 units/km^{2}). The racial makeup of the CDP was 3.74% White, 0.23% Black or African American, 93.69% Native American, and 2.34% from two or more races. 0.23% of the population were Hispanic or Latino of any race.

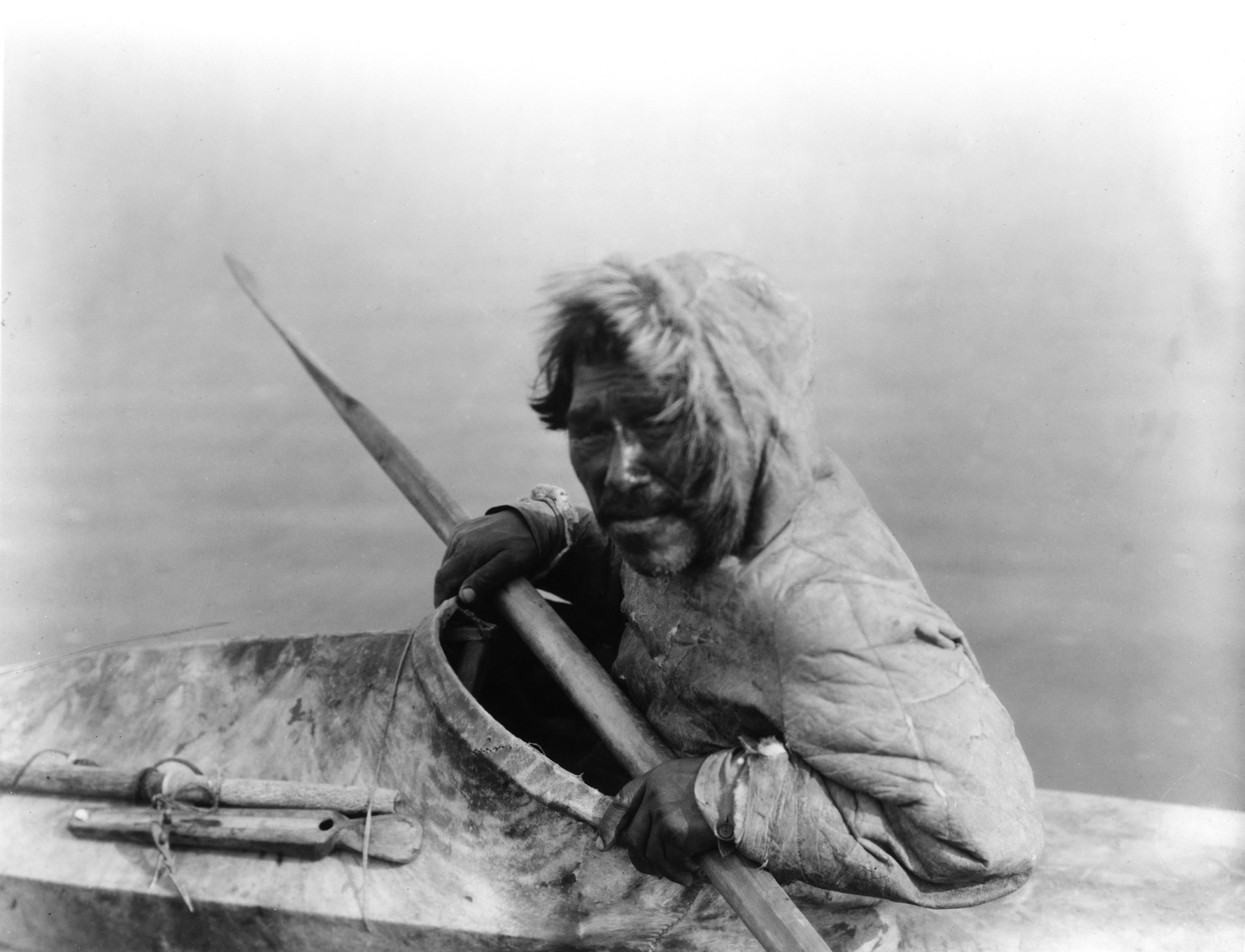
Inuk man, Noatak

There were 100 households, out of which 69.0% had children under the age of 18 living with them, 56.0% were married couples living together, 22.0% had a female householder with no husband present, and 10.0% were non-families. 9.0% of all households were made up of individuals, and none had someone living alone who was 65 years of age or older. The average household size was 4.28 and the average family size was 4.51.

In the CDP, the population was spread out, with 42.5% under the age of 18, 10.5% from 18 to 24, 28.7% from 25 to 44, 12.9% from 45 to 64, and 5.4% who were 65 years of age or older. The median age was 23 years. For every 100 females, there were 104.8 males. For every 100 females age 18 and over, there were 108.5 males.

The median income for a household in the CDP was $30,833, and the median income for a family was $31,667. Males had a median income of $25,833 versus $21,250 for females. The per capita income for the CDP was $9,659. About 25.0% of families and 22.0% of the population were below the poverty line, including 21.9% of those under age 18 and 13.6% of those age 65 or over.

== Transportation ==
Noatak has a 4,000-foot (1,200 m) gravel public airstrip and is primarily reached by air. No road goes to Noatak. Snowmobiles, ATV's, and small boats are important means of inter-village travel and for local subsistence activities.

== Facilities ==
The Napaaqtugmiut School, operated by the Northwest Arctic Borough School District, serves the community. Its current building opened in 2008. As of 2017 it had 177 students, with Alaska Natives making up 95% of the student body.

== See also ==
- Noatak Wilderness
