= Kivalina, Alaska =

Kivalina Kivalliñiq
- City
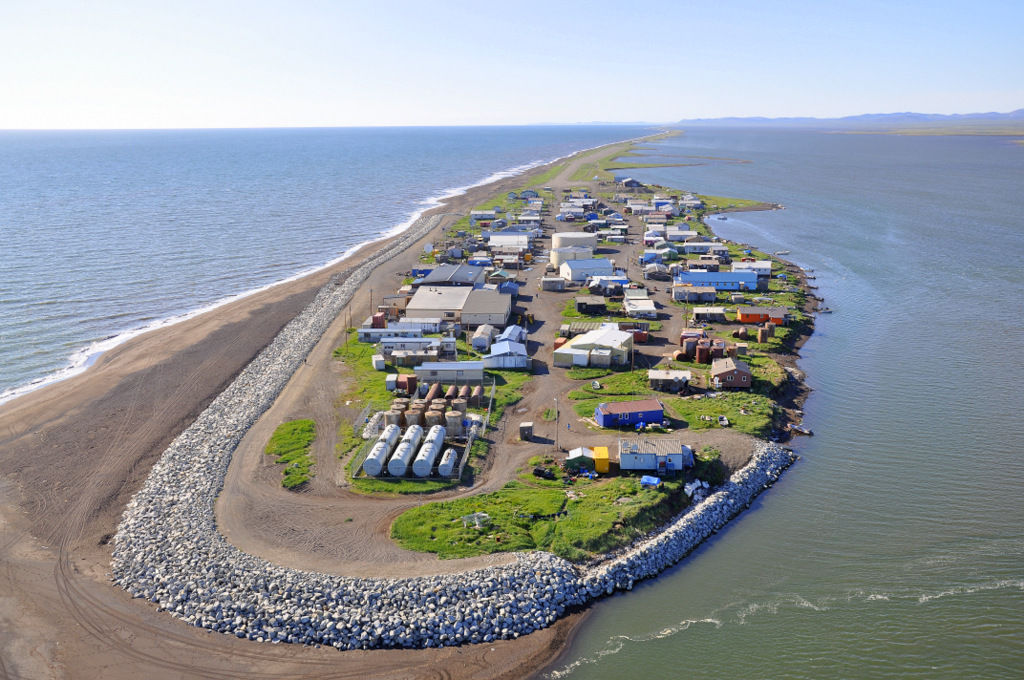
- Aerial view of Kivalina

- Location in Northwest Arctic Borough and the state of Alaska.
- Coordinates: 67°43′38″N 164°32′21″W
- Country: United States
- State: Alaska
- Borough: Northwest Arctic
- Incorporated: June 23, 1969

Government
  - Mayor: Austin Swan, Sr.
  - State senator: Donny Olson (D)
  - State rep.: Robyn Burke (D)

Area
  - Total: 4.16 sq mi (10.78 km^{2})
  - Land: 1.63 sq mi (4.23 km^{2})
  - Water: 2.53 sq mi (6.55 km^{2})
- Elevation: 13 ft (4 m)

Population (2020)
  - Total: 444
  - Density: 272.2/sq mi (105.08/km^{2})
- Time zone: UTC-9 (Alaska (AKST))
  - Summer (DST): UTC-8 (AKDT)
- ZIP Code: 99750
- Area code: 907
- FIPS code: 02-39960
- GNIS feature ID: 1413348, 2419411

Kivalina (/ˌkɪvəˈliːnə/ ki-və-LEE-nə, Inupiaq: Kivalliñiq) is a city and village in Northwest Arctic Borough, Alaska, United States. As of the 2020 census, Kivalina had a population of 444.

The island on which the village lies is threatened by rising sea levels and coastal erosion caused by climate change. As of 2013, it was predicted that the island would be inundated by 2025. In addition to well-publicized impacts of climate change, the Village of Kivalina has been a party in several environmentally related court cases.

== History ==
Kivalina is an Iñupiat community first reported as "Kivualinagmut" in 1847 by Lt. Lavrenty Zagoskin of the Imperial Russian Navy. It has long been a stopping place for travelers between Arctic coastal areas and Kotzebue Sound communities. Three bodies and artifacts were found in 2009 representing the Ipiutak culture, a pre-Thule, non-whaling civilization that disappeared over a millennium ago.

It is the only village in the region where people hunt the bowhead whale. The original village was located at the north end of the Kivalina Lagoon, but was relocated.

In about 1900, reindeer were brought to the area and some people were trained as reindeer herders.

An airstrip was built at Kivalina in 1960. Kivalina was incorporated as a second-class city in 1969. During the 1970s, a new school and an electric system were constructed in the city.

On December 5, 2014, the only general store in Kivalina burned down. In July 2015, a newer store was opened after months of rebuilding.

== Geography ==
Kivalina is on the southern tip of a 12 km (7.5 mi) long barrier island located between the Chukchi Sea and a lagoon at the mouth of the Kivalina River. It lies 130 km (81 mi) northwest of Kotzebue. According to the United States Census Bureau, the village has a total area of 3.9 square miles (10 km^{2}), of which 1.9 square miles (4.9 km^{2}) is land and 2.0 square miles (5.2 km^{2}) of it (51.55%) is water.

== Climate ==
Kivalina has a dry subarctic climate, closely bordering on a tundra, with long, very cold winters and short, cool summers. August is the wettest month of the year, while December is the snowiest month.

Climate data for Kivalina, Alaska (Kivalina Airport) (1991-2020 normals, extremes 1998-present)
Month	Jan	Feb	Mar	Apr	May	Jun	Jul	Aug	Sep	Oct	Nov	Dec	Year
Record high °F (°C)	47 (8)	52 (11)	48 (9)	62 (17)	68 (20)	96 (36)	94 (34)	89 (32)	65 (18)	58 (14)	40 (4)	39 (4)	96 (36)
Mean maximum °F (°C)	32.0 (0.0)	34.4 (1.3)	28.0 (−2.2)	38.3 (3.5)	54.4 (12.4)	70.6 (21.4)	72.0 (22.2)	65.8 (18.8)	57.5 (14.2)	44.4 (6.9)	32.0 (0.0)	31.8 (−0.1)	74.4 (23.6)
Mean daily maximum °F (°C)	6.6 (−14.1)	9.7 (−12.4)	9.4 (−12.6)	23.6 (−4.7)	38.2 (3.4)	50.0 (10.0)	56.3 (13.5)	54.5 (12.5)	46.2 (7.9)	30.5 (−0.8)	17.3 (−8.2)	10.0 (−12.2)	29.4 (−1.5)
Daily mean °F (°C)	−1.2 (−18.4)	1.3 (−17.1)	0.9 (−17.3)	14.8 (−9.6)	32.1 (0.1)	43.9 (6.6)	50.9 (10.5)	49.1 (9.5)	40.6 (4.8)	25.6 (−3.6)	11.4 (−11.4)	2.9 (−16.2)	22.7 (−5.2)
Mean daily minimum °F (°C)	−9.0 (−22.8)	−7.1 (−21.7)	−7.6 (−22.0)	6.0 (−14.4)	25.9 (−3.4)	37.8 (3.2)	45.5 (7.5)	43.7 (6.5)	35.1 (1.7)	20.6 (−6.3)	5.5 (−14.7)	−4.1 (−20.1)	16.0 (−8.9)
Mean minimum °F (°C)	−33.2 (−36.2)	−34.4 (−36.9)	−28.6 (−33.7)	−16.8 (−27.1)	9.5 (−12.5)	29.1 (−1.6)	37.7 (3.2)	34.6 (1.4)	23.0 (−5.0)	5.3 (−14.8)	−15.1 (−26.2)	−27.3 (−32.9)	−39.9 (−39.9)
Record low °F (°C)	−50 (−46)	−54 (−48)	−41 (−41)	−33 (−36)	−9 (−23)	21 (−6)	33 (1)	28 (−2)	12 (−11)	−8 (−22)	−30 (−34)	−41 (−41)	−54 (−48)
Average precipitation inches (mm)	0.28 (7.1)	0.44 (11)	0.18 (4.6)	0.56 (14)	0.57 (14)	0.79 (20)	1.41 (36)	2.33 (59)	1.52 (39)	0.93 (24)	0.51 (13)	0.17 (4.3)	9.69 (246)
Average precipitation days (≥ 0.01 in)	5.3	5.3	3.0	4.7	6.4	6.1	11.7	13.0	11.5	8.1	5.7	4.1	84.9
Source: NOAA

== Demographics ==
Historical population
Census	Pop.	Note	%±
1920	87		—
1930	99		13.8%
1940	98		−1.0%
1950	117		19.4%
1960	142		21.4%
1970	188		32.4%
1980	241		28.2%
1990	317		31.5%
2000	377		18.9%
2010	374		−0.8%
2020	444		18.7%
U.S. Decennial Census

Kivalina first appeared on the 1920 U.S. Census as an unincorporated (native) village. It was formally incorporated in 1969.

=== 2020 census ===
As of the 2020 census, Kivalina had a population of 444. The median age was 22.7 years. 42.1% of residents were under the age of 18 and 6.1% of residents were 65 years of age or older. For every 100 females, there were 115.5 males, and for every 100 females age 18 and over there were 108.9 males age 18 and over.

0.0% of residents lived in urban areas, while 100.0% lived in rural areas.

There were 81 households in Kivalina, of which 71.6% had children under the age of 18 living in them. Of all households, 30.9% were married-couple households, 34.6% were households with a male householder and no spouse or partner present, and 30.9% were households with a female householder and no spouse or partner present. About 18.5% of all households were made up of individuals and 2.5% had someone living alone who was 65 years of age or older.

There were 172 housing units, of which 52.9% were vacant. The homeowner vacancy rate was 0.0% and the rental vacancy rate was 0.0%.

Racial composition as of the 2020 census
Race	Number	Percent
White	8	1.8%
Black or African American	0	0.0%
American Indian and Alaska Native	434	97.7%
Asian	0	0.0%
Native Hawaiian and Other Pacific Islander	0	0.0%
Some other race	0	0.0%
Two or more races	2	0.5%
Hispanic or Latino (of any race)	1	0.2%

=== 2010 census ===
As of the census of 2010, there were 374 people, and 99 households. The population density was 202.1 inhabitants per square mile (78.0/km^{2}). There were 80 housing units at an average density of 42.9 per square mile (16.6/km^{2}). The racial makeup of the village was 3.45% White and 96.55% Native American. The Native Village of Kivalina is a federally recognized tribe with an elected tribal council. The City of Kivalina, organized under the Northwest Arctic Borough under the State of Alaska, has an elected mayor and city administrator and a 7-member city council. Per the Alaska Native Claims Settlement Act, NANA Corporation owns the surface and sub-surface rights to the city site and the surrounding area. Manilaaq Association serves the community as an Alaska Native non-profit regional corporation providing social, tribal and health care services.

In 2010, there were 78 households, out of which 61.5% had children under the age of 18 living with them, 62.8% were married couples living together, 15.4% had a female householder with no husband present, and 17.9% were non-families. 16.7% of all households were made up of individuals, and 3.8% had someone living alone who was 65 years of age or older. The average household size was 4.83 and the average family size was 5.50. In the village the population was spread out, with 44.0% under the age of 18, 13.3% from 18 to 24, 20.7% from 25 to 44, 15.9% from 45 to 64, and 6.1% who were 65 years of age or older. The median age was 21 years. For every 100 females, there were 106.0 males. For every 100 females age 18 and over, there were 113.1 males.

The median income for a household in the village was $30,833, and the median income for a family was $30,179. Males had a median income of $31,875 versus $21,875 for females. The per capita income for the village was $8,360. About 25.4% of families and 26.4% of the population were below the poverty line, including 27.9% of those under age 18 and 30.0% of those age 65 or over.

== Environmental issues ==
Due to severe sea wave erosion during storms, the city hopes to relocate again to a new site 12 km (7.5 mi) from the present site; studies of alternate sites are ongoing. According to the U.S. Army Corps of Engineers, the estimated cost of relocation runs between $95 and $125 million, whereas the Government Accountability Office (GAO) estimates it to be between $100 and $400 million. The sea ice that was once there, helping to protect the city, has now disappeared. Due to these rising sea levels, many people are out of their homes and since resources are becoming scarce, it is leading to overcrowding and poor sanitation.

In 2011, Haymarket Books published "Kivalina: A Climate Change Story" by Christine Shearer.

=== Kivalina v. ExxonMobil Corporation ===
The city of Kivalina and a federally recognized tribe, the Alaska Native Village of Kivalina, sued ExxonMobil, eight other oil companies, 14 power companies and one coal company in a lawsuit filed in federal court in San Francisco on February 26, 2008, claiming that the large amounts of greenhouse gases they emit contribute to global warming that threatens the community's existence. The lawsuit estimated the cost of relocation at $400 million. The suit was dismissed by the United States district court on September 30, 2009, on the grounds that regulating greenhouse emissions was a political rather than a legal issue and one that needed to be resolved by Congress and the Administration rather than by courts.

=== Kivalina v Teck Cominco ===
In 2004, Kivalina, under representation from the co-founder of Center on Race Poverty and Environment, Luke Cole, sued Canadian mining company Teck Cominco, operator of the Red Dog Mine, for polluting its source of drinking water and subsistence fish resources through their discharge of mine waste into the Wulik River. Teck Cominco settled the suit in 2008 by agreeing to build a wastewater pipeline from the mine to the ocean that would bypass discharging into the Wulik River. However, the pipeline was not constructed and the alternative settlement clause was followed.

=== Kivalina v. US EPA ===
In 2010, the Native Village of Kivalina IRA Council brought suit against the US EPA for failing to adequately address public comments in their permitting of the Red Dog Mine discharge plan under the National Pollutant Discharge Elimination System (NPDES). In 2012, the US Ninth Circuit court upheld the decision of the EPA Appeals Board to not review the permit, citing the insufficiency of the Tribe's argument.

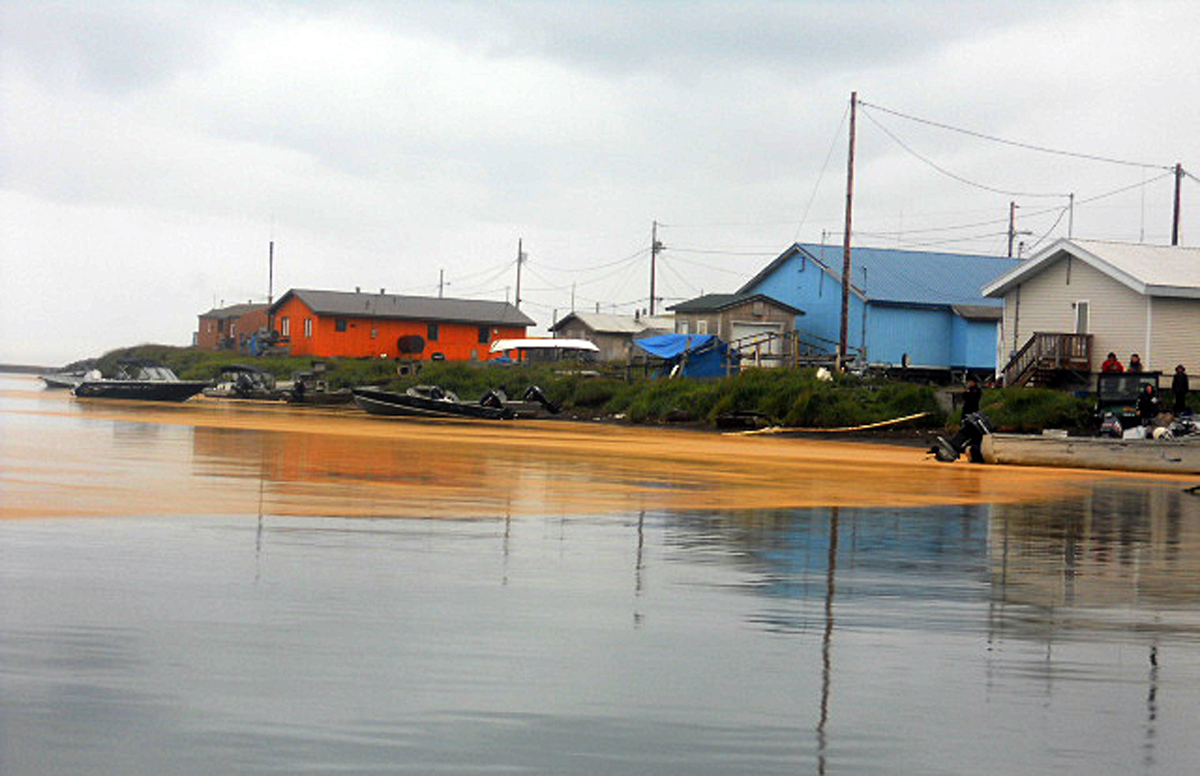
"Orange goo"

=== Orange goo ===
On August 4, 2011, it was reported that residents of the city of Kivalina had seen a strange orange goo wash up on the shores. According to the Associated Press, "Tests have been conducted on the substance on the surface of the water in Kivalina. City Administrator Janet Mitchell told the Associated Press that the substance has also shown up in some residents' rain buckets." On August 8, 2011, Associated Press reported that the substance consisted of millions of microscopic eggs. Later, officials of the National Oceanic and Atmospheric Administration (NOAA) confirmed that the orange colored materials were some kind of crustacean eggs or embryos, but subsequent examination resulted in a declaration that the substance consisted of spores from a possibly undescribed species of rust fungus, later revealed to be Chrysomyxa ledicola.

=== Sea level rise and coastal erosion ===
On numerous occasions, the community has been inundated by storm surges and forced to evacuate. While the risk of inundation from sea water has always existed, storms caused extensive flooding in 1970, 1976, 2002, 2004, and spurred a village-wide evacuation in 2007. To slow erosion, the US Army Corps of Engineers conducted a rip-rap revetment project along the tip of the barrier island and adjacent to the airport.

=== Other climate change impacts ===
In addition to increased flooding from storm surges, bank erosion along the Wulik River causes increased turbidity which affects the city's drinking water source and complicates water treatment.

== Relocation ==
Due to severe sea wave erosion during storms, the city hopes to relocate again to a new site 12 km (7.5 mi) from the present site. In 2009, Kivalina was identified by a GAO report as one of 31 environmentally threatened communities in Alaska. Relocation to a site off the barrier island to higher ground has had little progress. According to the U.S. Army Corps of Engineers, the estimated cost of relocation runs between $95 and $125 million, whereas the Government Accountability Office (GAO) estimates it to be between $100 and $400 million. In 2018, a decision was made to build an evacuation road across the Kivalina Lagoon to provide a means for the community to escape devastating storms that can inundate the barrier island. The road was officially opened in late 2020 and connects the village with the Kisimigiugtuq School on K-Hill, which opened in November, 2022.

== Kivalina in the media ==
Kivalina's environmental issues were prominently featured in The 2015 Weather Channel documentary "Alaska: State of Emergency" hosted by Dave Malkoff. Kivalina was one of the two towns featured in the Al Jazeera English Fault Lines documentary, When the Water Took the Land. The community, who were originally nomadic, were given an ultimatum that they would have to settle in the permanent community or their children would be taken from them. The village's plight was also examined in Kivalina, an hourlong documentary released as part of the World Channel series America ReFramed. The Atlantic did a photo journalism story documenting climate change in Kivalina in their September 2019 article, The Impact of Climate Change on Kivalina, Alaska.

== Education ==
The McQueen School, operated by the Northwest Arctic Borough School District, serves the community. As of 2017 it had 141 students, with Alaska Natives making up 100% of the student body.

== See also ==
- Kivalina Airport
