= Buckland, Alaska =

City in Alaska, United States

Buckland Nunachiam
- City
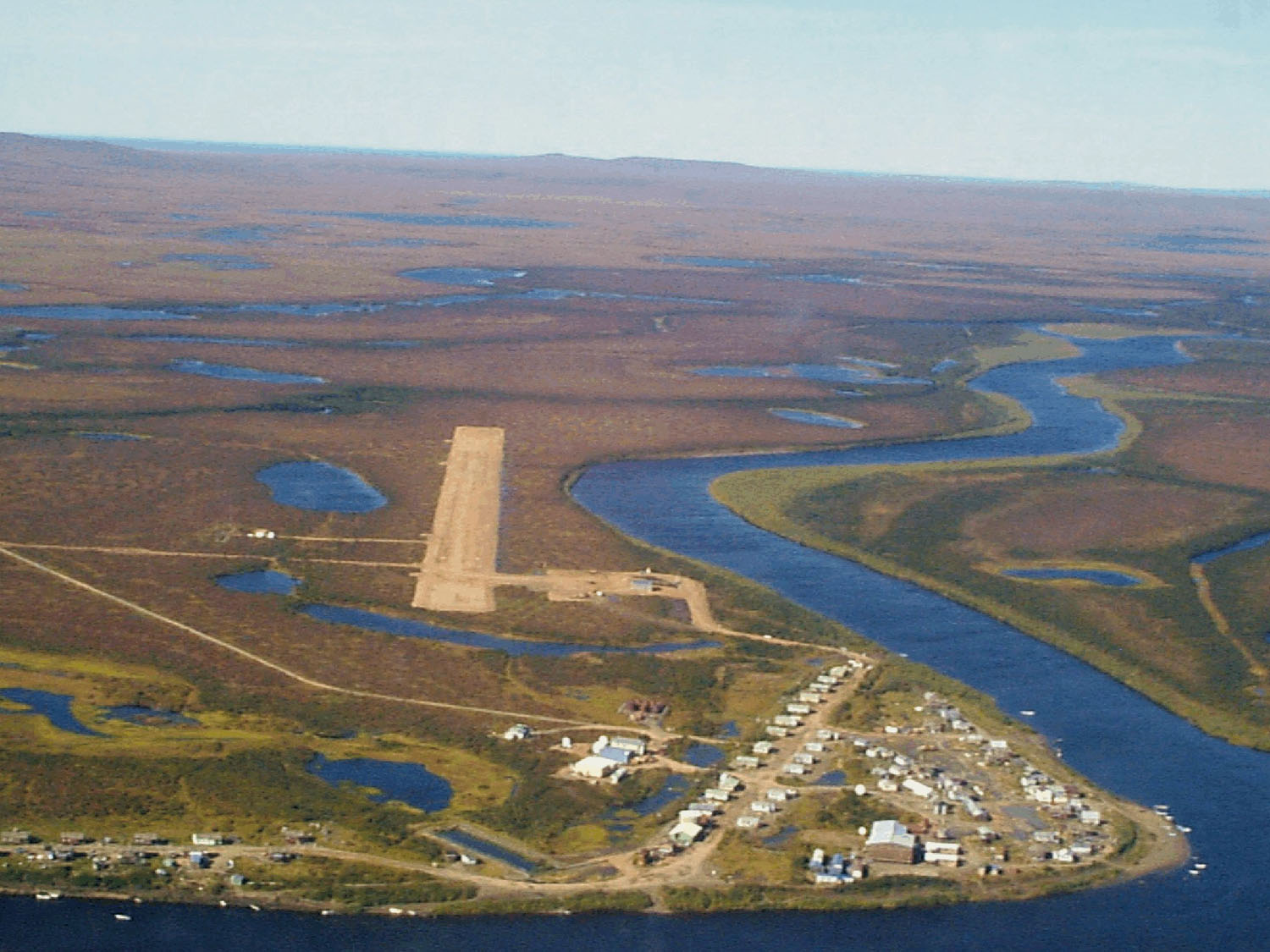
- Aerial view of Buckland from the east

- Location in Northwest Arctic Borough and the state of Alaska.
- Coordinates: 65°59′5″N 161°7′47″W
- Country: United States
- State: Alaska
- Borough: Northwest Arctic
- Incorporated: June 6, 1966

Government
  - Mayor: Glenna Parrish
  - State senator: Donny Olson (D)
  - State rep.: Robyn Burke (D)

Area
  - Total: 1.00 sq mi (2.59 km^{2})
  - Land: 0.85 sq mi (2.21 km^{2})
  - Water: 0.15 sq mi (0.39 km^{2})
- Elevation: 13 ft (4 m)

Population (2020)
  - Total: 550
  - Density: 645.8/sq mi (249.34/km^{2})
- Time zone: UTC-9 (Alaska (AKST))
  - Summer (DST): UTC-8 (AKDT)
- ZIP code: 99727
- Area code: 907
- FIPS code: 02-09600
- GNIS feature ID: 1412684

Buckland (Inupiaq: Nunatchiaq) is a city in Northwest Arctic Borough, Alaska, United States. As of the 2020 census, Buckland had a population of 550. It takes its English name from the Buckland River, which in turn takes its name from Oxford University professor William Buckland.

== Geography ==
Buckland is located at 65°59′5″N 161°7′47″W (65.984795, -161.129717).

According to the United States Census Bureau, the city has a total area of 1.4 square miles (3.6 km^{2}), of which, 1.2 square miles (3.1 km^{2}) of it is land and 0.2 square miles (0.52 km^{2}) of it (13.48%) is water.

== Demographics ==
Historical population
Census	Pop.	Note	%±
1920	52		—
1930	104		100.0%
1940	115		10.6%
1960	87		—
1970	104		19.5%
1980	177		70.2%
1990	318		79.7%
2000	406		27.7%
2010	416		2.5%
2020	550		32.2%
U.S. Decennial Census

Buckland first appeared on the 1920 U.S. Census as an unincorporated village. Around 1941, residents relocated temporarily to Elephant Point (AKA Buckland Post Office) on Eschscholtz Bay, and Buckland did not report a population for the 1950 census (108 was reported for Elephant Point). Residents soon returned to Buckland, and it has reported in every successive census since 1960 and formally incorporated in 1966.

=== 2020 census ===
As of the 2020 census, Buckland had a population of 550. The median age was 21.3 years. 43.6% of residents were under the age of 18 and 3.3% of residents were 65 years of age or older. For every 100 females there were 131.1 males, and for every 100 females age 18 and over there were 133.1 males age 18 and over.

0.0% of residents lived in urban areas, while 100.0% lived in rural areas.

There were 108 households in Buckland, of which 67.6% had children under the age of 18 living in them. Of all households, 45.4% were married-couple households, 23.1% were households with a male householder and no spouse or partner present, and 20.4% were households with a female householder and no spouse or partner present. About 18.6% of all households were made up of individuals and 1.9% had someone living alone who was 65 years of age or older.

There were 111 housing units, of which 2.7% were vacant. The homeowner vacancy rate was 0.0% and the rental vacancy rate was 0.0%.

Racial composition as of the 2020 census
Race	Number	Percent
White	6	1.1%
Black or African American	2	0.4%
American Indian and Alaska Native	525	95.5%
Asian	1	0.2%
Native Hawaiian and Other Pacific Islander	0	0.0%
Some other race	0	0.0%
Two or more races	16	2.9%
Hispanic or Latino (of any race)	2	0.4%

=== 2000 census ===
As of the census of 2000, there were 406 people, 84 households, and 75 families residing in the city. The population density was 332.3 inhabitants per square mile (128.3/km^{2}). There were 89 housing units at an average density of 72.8 per square mile (28.2/km^{2}). The racial makeup of the city was 3.20% White, 95.81% Native American, and 0.99% from two or more races. 1.23% of the population were Hispanic or Latino of any race.

There were 84 households, out of which 66.7% had children under the age of 18 living with them, 65.5% were married couples living together, 20.2% had a female householder with no husband present, and 10.7% were non-families. 8.3% of all households were made up of individuals, and 1.2% had someone living alone who was 65 years of age or older. The average household size was 4.83 and the average family size was 5.19.

In the city, the age distribution of the population shows 51.2% under the age of 18, 10.8% from 18 to 24, 24.4% from 25 to 44, 10.1% from 45 to 64, and 3.4% who were 65 years of age or older. The median age was 18 years. For every 100 females, there were 116.0 males. For every 100 females age 18 and over, there were 106.3 males.

The median income for a household in the city was $38,333, and the median income for a family was $40,000. Males had a median income of $31,563 versus $27,500 for females. The per capita income for the city was $9,624. About 7.9% of families and 11.9% of the population were below the poverty line, including 14.4% of those under age 18 and none of those age 65 or over.

== Education ==
The Buckland School, operated by the Northwest Arctic Borough School District, serves the community. As of 2017 it had 168 students, with Alaska Natives making up 96% of the student body. The current school building opened in 2002.
