= Northwest Arctic Borough, Alaska =

Borough in Alaska, United States

- Borough
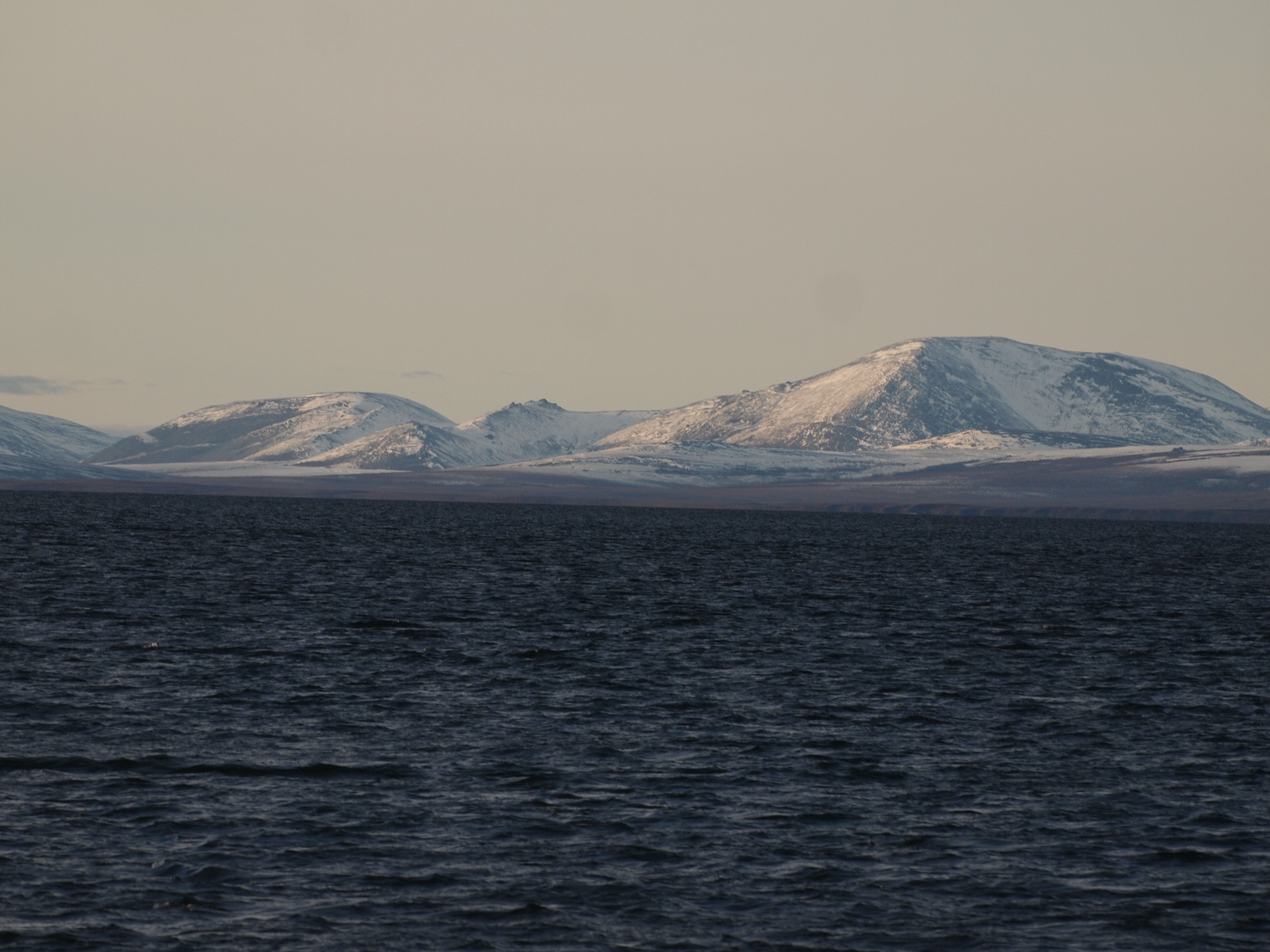
- The Kotzebue Sound as seen from Cape Krusenstern National Monument

- Seal

- Location within the U.S. state of Alaska
- Coordinates: 67°N 160°W
- Country: United States
- State: Alaska
- Incorporated: June 2, 1986
- Named for: Northwest and Arctic location
- Seat: Kotzebue
- Largest city: Kotzebue

Government
  - Mayor: Dickie Moto

Area
  - Total: 40,749 sq mi (105,540 km^{2})
  - Land: 35,573 sq mi (92,130 km^{2})
  - Water: 5,176 sq mi (13,410 km^{2}) 12.7%

Population (2020)
  - Total: 7,793
  - Estimate (2025): 7,095 ▼
  - Density: 0.2191/sq mi (0.08458/km^{2})
- Time zone: UTC−9 (Alaska)
  - Summer (DST): UTC−8 (ADT)
- Congressional district: At-large
- Website: nwabor.org

Northwest Arctic Borough is a borough located in the U.S. state of Alaska. As of the 2020 census, the population was 7,793, up from 7,523 in 2010. The borough seat is Kotzebue. The borough was formed on June 2, 1986.

== Geography ==
According to the U.S. Census Bureau, the borough has a total area of 40,749 square miles (105,540 km^{2}), of which 35,573 square miles (92,130 km^{2}) is land and 5,176 square miles (13,410 km^{2}) (12.7%) is water. By land area, it is slightly larger than the state of Maine.

Its coastline is limited by the Chukchi Sea. The Kotzebue Sound, a significant wildlife area, is a prominent water body within the Northwest Arctic Borough.

=== Adjacent boroughs and census areas ===
- North Slope Borough, Alaska - north
- Yukon–Koyukuk Census Area, Alaska - east
- Nome Census Area, Alaska - south

=== National protected areas ===
- Alaska Maritime National Wildlife Refuge (part of the Chukchi Sea unit)
  - Chamisso Wilderness
- Bering Land Bridge National Preserve (part)
- Cape Krusenstern National Monument
- Gates of the Arctic National Park and Preserve (part)
  - Gates of the Arctic Wilderness (part)
- Kobuk Valley National Park
  - Kobuk Valley Wilderness
- Koyukuk National Wildlife Refuge (part)
- Noatak National Preserve (part)
  - Noatak Wilderness (part)
- Selawik National Wildlife Refuge (part)
  - Selawik Wilderness

== Politics ==
United States presidential election results for Northwest Arctic Borough, Alaska
Year	Republican		Democratic		Third party(ies)	
Year	No.	%	No.	%	No.	%
1960	555	68.94%	250	31.06%	0	0.00%
1964	156	19.85%	630	80.15%	0	0.00%
1968	501	49.36%	467	46.01%	47	4.63%
1972	744	56.49%	551	41.84%	22	1.67%
1976	476	38.83%	712	58.08%	38	3.10%
1980	589	39.69%	732	49.33%	163	10.98%
1984	1,146	58.89%	745	38.28%	55	2.83%
1988	945	56.49%	663	39.63%	65	3.89%
1992	871	39.99%	825	37.88%	482	22.13%
1996	785	37.72%	1,032	49.59%	264	12.69%
2000	1,081	50.89%	818	38.51%	225	10.59%
2004	1,123	56.21%	801	40.09%	74	3.70%
2008	1,328	56.08%	952	40.20%	88	3.72%
2012	611	30.52%	1,309	65.38%	82	4.10%
2016	563	25.79%	1,207	55.29%	413	18.92%
2020	735	38.58%	1,031	54.12%	139	7.30%
2024	713	47.50%	648	43.17%	140	9.33%

== Demographics ==
Historical population
Census	Pop.	Note	%±
1960	3,560		—
1970	4,434		24.6%
1980	4,831		9.0%
1990	6,113		26.5%
2000	7,208		17.9%
2010	7,523		4.4%
2020	7,793		3.6%
2025 (est.)	7,095	▼	−9.0%
U.S. Decennial Census; 1790-1960 1900-1990; 1990-2000 2010-2020

=== 2020 census ===
As of the 2020 census, the borough had a population of 7,793 and a median age of 28.0 years; 36.0% of residents were under the age of 18 and 7.4% were 65 years of age or older. For every 100 females there were 110.1 males, and for every 100 females age 18 and over there were 109.7 males age 18 and over.

There were 2,014 households in the borough, of which 54.2% had children under the age of 18 living with them and 26.0% had a female householder with no spouse or partner present. About 20.8% of all households were made up of individuals and 5.5% had someone living alone who was 65 years of age or older.

There were 2,717 housing units, of which 25.9% were vacant. Among occupied housing units, 57.0% were owner-occupied and 43.0% were renter-occupied. The homeowner vacancy rate was 0.0% and the rental vacancy rate was 7.7%.

0.0% of residents lived in urban areas, while 100.0% lived in rural areas.

=== 2000 census ===
At the 2000 census, there were 7,208 people, 1,780 households and 1,404 families residing in the borough. The population density was 0.18 per square mile (0.069/km^{2}). There were 2,540 housing units at an average density of 0 per square mile (0/km^{2}). The racial makeup of the borough was 12.32% White, 0.21% Black or African American, 82.46% Native American, 0.89% Asian, 0.06% Pacific Islander, 0.36% from other races, and 3.70% from two or more races. 0.79% of the population were Hispanic or Latino of any race. 40.00% reported speaking Inupiat or "Eskimo" at home.

There were 1,780 households, of which 55.20% had children under the age of 18 living with them, 47.90% were married couples living together, 19.70% had a female householder with no husband present, and 21.10% were non-families. 16.60% of all households were made up of individuals, and 2.10% had someone living alone who was 65 years of age or older. The average household size was 3.87 and the average family size was 4.36.

Age distribution was 41.50% under the age of 18, 10.00% from 18 to 24, 28.10% from 25 to 44, 15.50% from 45 to 64, and 5.00% who were 65 years of age or older. The median age was 24 years. For every 100 females, there were 114.50 males. For every 100 females age 18 and over, there were 120.70 males.

=== Racial and ethnic composition ===
Northwest Arctic Borough, Alaska – Racial composition
Race (NH = Non-Hispanic)	2020	2010	2000	1990	1980
White alone (NH)	8.8% (684)	11% (830)	12.2% (878)	13.5% (824)	14% (677)
Black alone (NH)	0.9% (71)	0.5% (35)	0.2% (15)	0.2% (12)	0.1% (5)
American Indian alone (NH)	82.8% (6,453)	81.1% (6,102)	82.1% (5,919)	84.9% (5,190)	85% (4,108)
Asian alone (NH)	0.7% (53)	0.6% (42)	0.9% (64)	0.8% (48)	0.1% (4)
Pacific Islander alone (NH)	0.1% (11)	0.2% (12)	0.1% (4)		
Other race alone (NH)	0% (0)	0% (3)	0.1% (8)	0% (3)	0.1% (6)
Multiracial (NH)	5.4% (419)	5.9% (441)	3.6% (263)	—	—
Hispanic/Latino (any race)	1.3% (102)	0.8% (58)	0.8% (57)	0.6% (36)	0.6% (31)

The most reported detailed ancestries were:

- Inupiat (Inupiaq) (12.1%)
- Native Village of Kotzebue (10.5%)
- Native Village of Selawik (9.7%)
- Noorvik Native Community (9%)
- Native Village of Noatak (7%)
- Native Village of Buckland (6.8%)
- Native Village of Kivalina (5.4%)
- Nana Inupiat (3.2%)
- Native Village of Kiana (2.5%)
- German (2.2%)

== Communities ==
=== Cities ===
- Ambler
- Buckland
- Deering
- Kiana
- Kivalina
- Kobuk
- Kotzebue
- Noorvik
- Selawik
- Shungnak

=== Census-designated places ===
- Noatak
- Red Dog Mine

== See also ==
- List of airports in the Northwest Arctic Borough
