= Ambler Airport =

Airport in Alaska

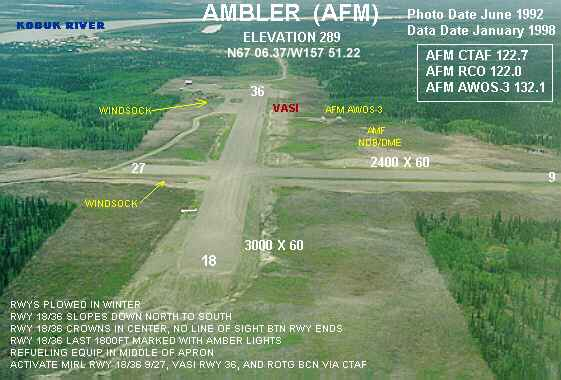
- IATA: ABL; ICAO: PAFM; FAA LID: AFM

Summary
- Airport type: Public
- Owner: Alaska DOT&PF - Northern Region
- Serves: Ambler, Alaska
- Elevation AMSL: 334 ft (102 m)
- Coordinates: 67°06′23.9″N 157°51′25.6″W

Map
- Location of airport in Alaska

Runways
Direction	Length		Surface
Direction	ft	m	Surface
01/19	4,000	1,219	Gravel/dirt
10/28	2,410	735	Gravel/dirt

Statistics (2015)
- Aircraft operations: 5,000 (2014)
- Based aircraft: 1
- Passengers: 3,727
- Freight: 986,000 lbs
- Source: Federal Aviation Administration

Ambler Airport (IATA: ABL, ICAO: PAFM, FAA LID: AFM) (Iñupiaq: Ivisaappaat Mirviat) is a state-owned public-use airport located one nautical mile (1.85 km) north of the central business district of Ambler, a city in the Northwest Arctic Borough of the U.S. state of Alaska.

As per Federal Aviation Administration records, the airport had 2,357 passenger boardings (enplanements) in calendar year 2008, an increase of 0.13% from the 2,354 enplanements in 2007. This airport is included in the FAA's National Plan of Integrated Airport Systems for 2009–2013, which categorizes it as a general aviation facility.

Although most U.S. airports use the same three-letter location identifier for the FAA and IATA, this airport is assigned AFM by the FAA and ABL by the IATA. The airport's ICAO identifier is PAFM.

== Facilities ==
Ambler Airport covers an area of 272 acres (110 ha) at an elevation of 334 feet (102 m) above mean sea level. It has two runways with gravel surfaces: 9/27 measures 2,400 by 60 feet (732 x 18 m) and 18/36 is 3,000 by 60 feet (914 x 18 m).

== Airlines and destinations ==
Airlines	Destinations
Bering Air	Kobuk, Kotzebue, Shungnak

=== Statistics ===
Carrier shares: January – December 2015
Carrier	Passengers (arriving and departing)
Bering Air	1,930(51.73%)
Hageland	1,800(48.27%)

Top domestic destinations: Jan. – Dec. 2015
Rank	City	Airport	Passengers
1	Kotzebue, AK	Ralph Wien Memorial Airport (OTZ)	1,510
2	Shungnak, AK	Shungnak Airport (SHG)	150
3	Selawik, AK	Selawik Airport (WLK)	80
4	Kobuk, AK	Kobuk Airport (OBU)	50
5	Noorvik, AK	Noorvik Airport (ORV)	30

== See also ==
- List of airports in Alaska
