= Kobuk Airport =

Airport in Alaska, United States

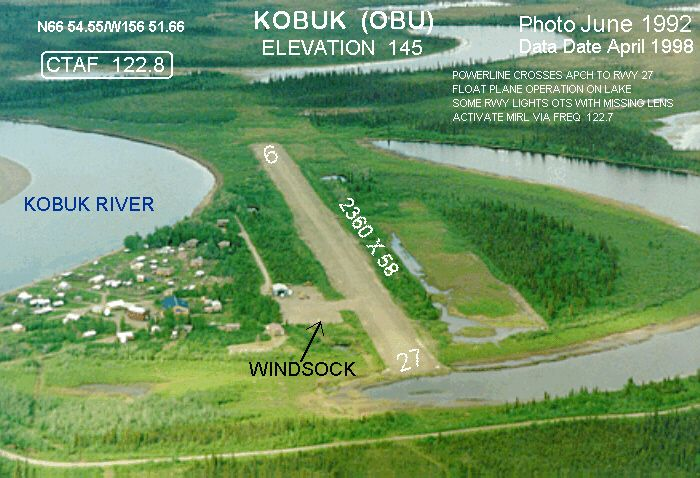
- IATA: OBU; ICAO: PAOB; FAA LID: OBU

Summary
- Airport type: Public
- Owner: State of Alaska DOT&PF
- Serves: Kobuk, Alaska
- Elevation AMSL: 142 ft (43 m)
- Coordinates: 66°54′44″N 156°53′50″W

Map
- Location of airport in Alaska

Runways
Direction	Length		Surface
Direction	ft	m	Surface
9/27	4,020	1,225	Gravel

Statistics (2011)
- Aircraft operations: 5,000
- Source: Federal Aviation Administration

Kobuk Airport (IATA: OBU, ICAO: PAOB, FAA LID: OBU) (Iñupiaq: Laugviik Mirviak) is a state-owned public-use airport located in Kobuk, a city in the Northwest Arctic Borough of the U.S. state of Alaska.

As per the Federal Aviation Administration, this airport had 1,176 passenger boardings (enplanements) in calendar year 2008, 1,048 in 2009, and 1,255 in 2010. The National Plan of Integrated Airport Systems for 2011–2015 categorized it as a general aviation facility (the commercial service category requires at least 2,500 enplanements per year).

== Facilities and aircraft ==
Kobuk Airport covers an area of 167 acres (68 ha) at an elevation of 142 feet (43 m) above mean sea level. It has one runway designated 9/27 with a gravel surface measuring 4,020 by 75 feet (1,225 x 23 m).

For the 12-month period ending September 29, 2011, the airport had 5,000 aircraft operations, an average of 13 per day, 100% air taxi.

== Airlines and destinations ==
The following airline offers scheduled passenger service:

Airlines	Destinations
Bering Air	Ambler, Kotzebue, Shungnak

They have cargo flights from Easy Fly Express.

=== Statistics ===
Carrier shares: January – December 2013
Carrier	Passengers (arriving and departing)
Bering	1,510(51.30%)
Hageland	1,410(48.16%)
Wright	20(0.55%)

Top domestic destinations: Jan. – Dec. 2013
Rank	Destination	Airport	Passengers	
Rank	Destination	Airport	2013	2012
1	Kotzebue, AK	Ralph Wien Memorial (OTZ)	1,190	1,040
2	Shungnak, AK	Shungnak Airport (SHG)	130	130
3	Ambler, AK	Ambler Airport (ABL)	30	20
4	Selawik, AK	Selawik Airport (WLK)	30	20
5	Noorvik, Alaska	Robert (Bob) Curtis Memorial (ORV)	20	10
6	Kiana, Alaska	Bob Baker Memorial (IAN)	20	10
7	Fairbanks, Alaska	Fairbanks International (FAI)	10	<10
8	Prospect Creek, AK	Prospect Creek Airport (PPC)	<10	<10
9	Barrow, AK	Wiley Post-Will Rogers Memorial (BRW)	<10	<10
10	Anchorage, AK	Ted Stevens Anchorage International (ANC)	<10	<10

== See also ==
- List of airports in Alaska
