= 2024 Alaska Air Fuel Douglas C-54 crash =

2024 aviation accident in Alaska

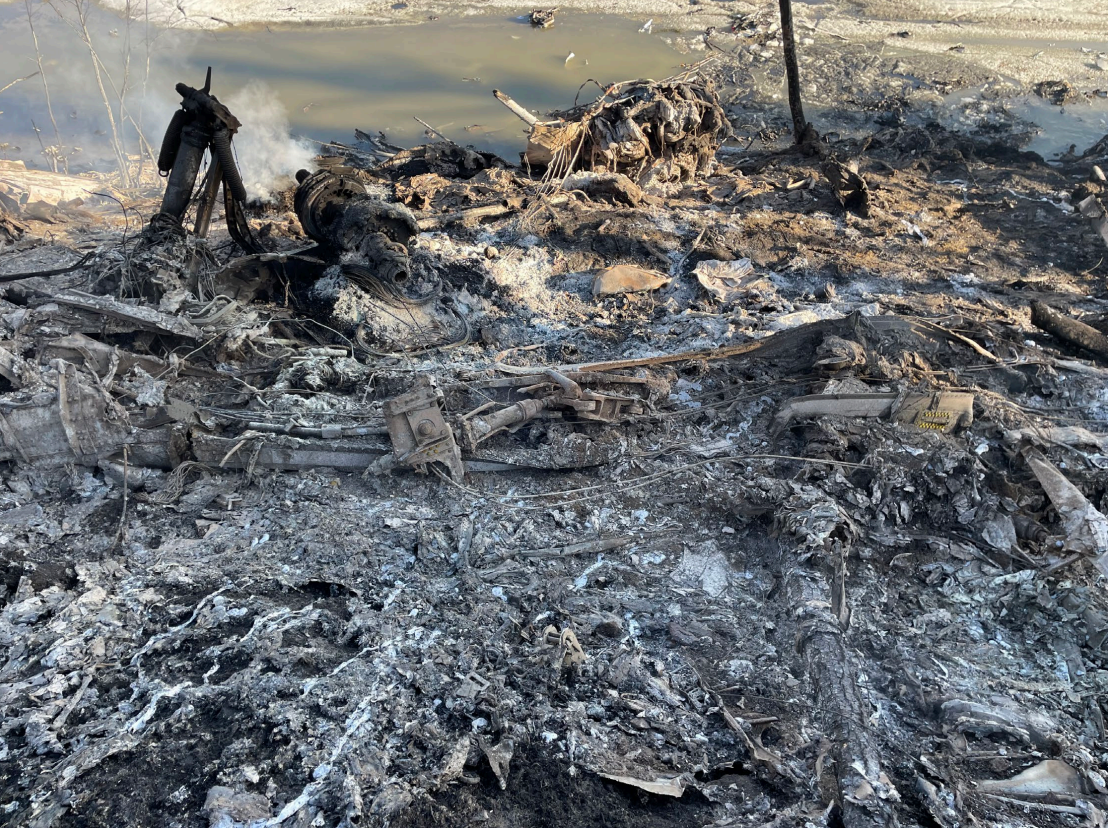
- The wreckage of the aircraft looking downhill

Accident
- Date: April 23, 2024
- Summary: Loss of control following engine failure and fuel explosion
- Site: Tanana River, near Fairbanks International Airport, Fairbanks, Alaska, United States; 64°44′43″N 148°04′46″W

Aircraft
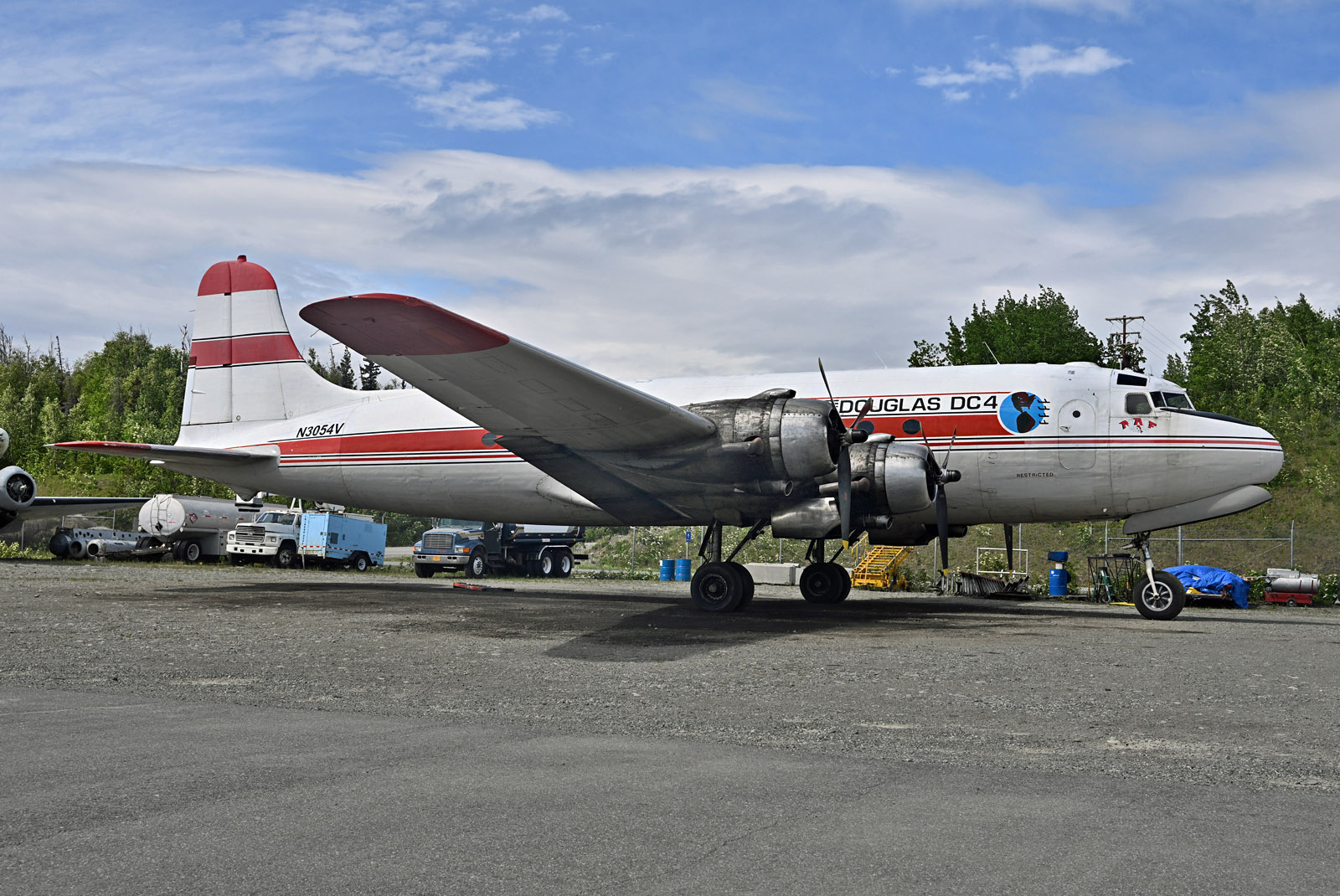
- N3054V, the aircraft involved in the accident, seen in 2023
- Aircraft type: Douglas C-54D
- Operator: Alaska Air Fuel
- Call sign: NOVEMBER 3054 VICTOR
- Registration: N3054V
- Flight origin: Fairbanks International Airport, Fairbanks, Alaska, United States
- Destination: Kobuk Airport, Kobuk, Alaska, United States
- Occupants: 2
- Crew: 2
- Fatalities: 2
- Survivors: 0

On April 23, 2024, a Douglas C-54 Skymaster operated by Alaska Air Fuel crashed near the Tanana River shortly after takeoff, killing both crew members. The aircraft, transporting fuel from Fairbanks International Airport in Fairbanks, Alaska, to Kobuk Airport in Kobuk, Alaska, suffered a failure on the outboard engine on the left wing shortly after takeoff. The crew attempted to resolve the failure and return to the airport, but a fuel explosion resulted in part of the aircraft's aileron controls separating. The crew were unable to recover from the subsequent loss of control.

The investigation, conducted by the National Transportation Safety Board (NTSB), found that the maintenance done to the left outboard engine did not fix the dripping fuel tank located behind the engine, causing fuel to drip into the space between it and the engine. The wreckage showed that the nut used to connect the propeller feathering was incorrectly installed. When the pilots tried to feather the failed engine's propeller after it failed for undetermined reasons, the hose related to the feathering pump system sprayed high-pressure engine oil around the hot exhaust system, resulting in a fire. The fuel that had leaked into the space behind the engine subsequently ignited, resulting in the fuel explosion, loss of control, and crash.

== Background ==
=== Operator ===
Alaska Air Fuel is a FAR part 91 aircraft operator based out of Wasilla, Alaska. The company transports various fuels to remote Alaskan communities. The state's limited road network means that road transportation is often difficult and expensive, making air transport more effective. Alaska Air Fuel uses the Douglas DC-4 and its variants to transport fuel supplied by Crowley Fuels across the state.

=== Aircraft ===
The aircraft involved in the accident was a 1945-built Douglas C-54D, a military variant of the DC-4, registered as N3054V. The aircraft first saw service with the United States Air Force, United States Navy, and Royal Air Force for 31 years in military operations. In 1976, California-based Aero Union acquired the aircraft and converted it into a tanker for use in aerial firefighting. In 2001, it was transferred to an Arizona-based company and in 2007, to a fuel transport company based in Alaska. Alaska Air Fuel acquired the aircraft in 2013 and rebuilt the airframe between 2018 and 2020. The aircraft had a total of 24,726 airframe hours and carried Pratt & Whitney R-2000-7M2 radial piston engines.

=== Crew ===
The aircraft was piloted by two crew members. The pilot was 68-year-old John Sliwinski, who was also the owner of the company, and the co-pilot was 63-year-old Harry Secoy. Sliwinski had a total of 35,547 flight hours, 20,980 of which were as pilot-in-command. Secoy had a total of 10,769 flight hours, 4,061 hours of which were as pilot-in-command.

== Accident ==
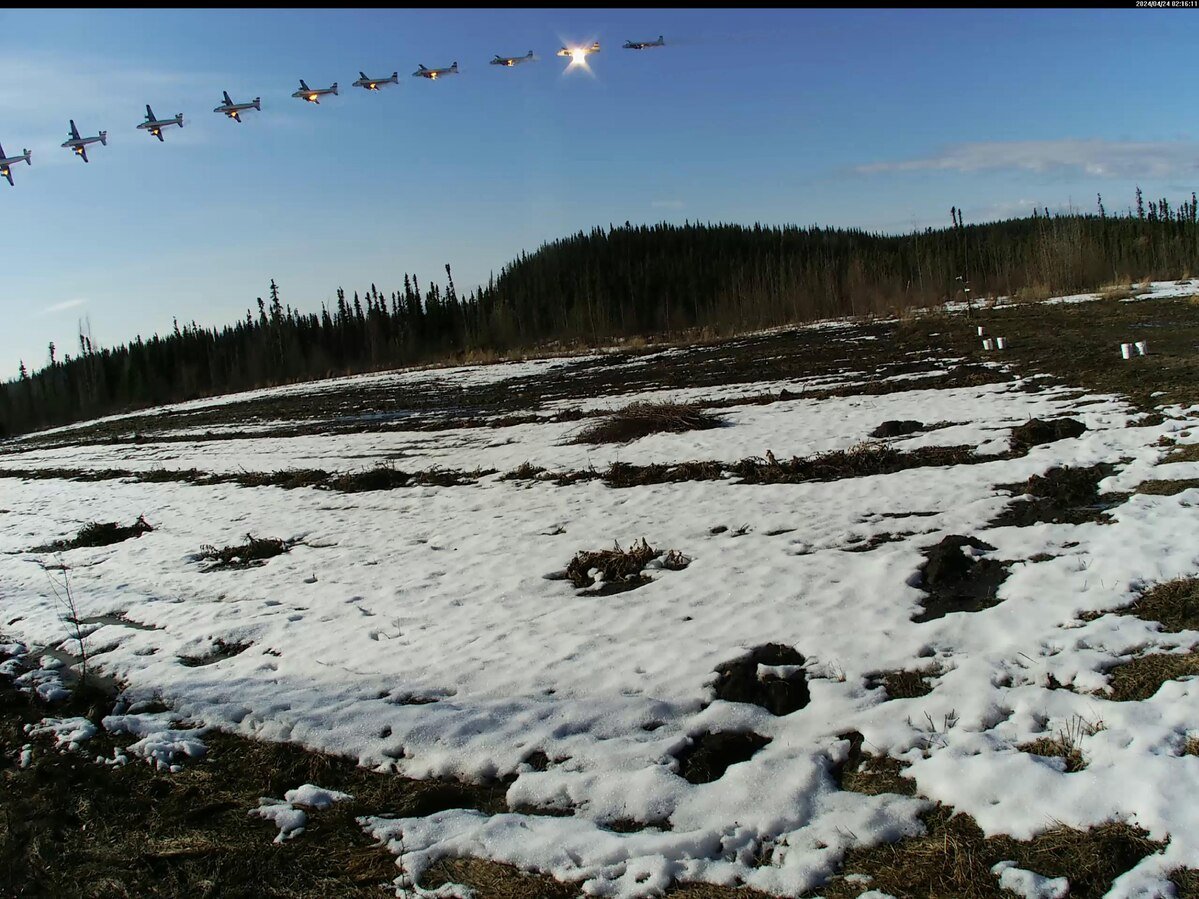
A compilation of CCTV footage showing the aircraft's last moments

On April 23, 2024, N3054V was scheduled to fly from Fairbanks International Airport to Kobuk Airport to transport 3,400 US gal (13,000 L) of unleaded fuel and two 100 US gal (380 L) propane tanks. The aircraft was carrying 1,300 US gal (4,900 L) for its four engines. The airplane was powered up at 9:25 am and departed from Fairbanks Airport at 9:55. Shortly after takeoff, the plane started to turn to the west. Witnesses on the ground then saw smoke coming out of engine one (outboard left engine), which was no longer operating. Three minutes after departure, the crew reported that there was a fire onboard to air traffic control and requested a left turn back to the airport. Video surveillance footage showed white smoke and fire developing behind the engine. Seconds after making the emergency call to ATC, a bright explosion was captured coming from the engine. The aircraft entered a sharp left turn and began an uncontrolled descent. The failing engine separated from the aircraft approximately 100 ft (30 m) above the ground and landed on the Tanana River. At 10:03, infrasound data from the University of Alaska Fairbanks recorded the aircraft impacting terrain.

The aircraft was destroyed in the impact and a post-crash fire ensued. Both pilots were killed in the crash. An explosion was recorded by infrasound data at 10:06. Most of the fuel on board was consumed by the post-crash fire. Debris from the aircraft was mostly concentrated along a 450 ft (140 m) path near the banks of the Tanana River. The separated engine one and other sheet metal debris landed on the frozen river. The upper left section of the left wing, the aileron bell housing for engine one and several aluminum fragments were found in an aerial search near the location where the in-flight explosion occurred.

== Investigation ==
Surveillance video footage of the explosion in engine one

The investigation into the accident was conducted by the National Transportation Safety Board (NTSB).

Security camera footage from a farm located southwest of Fairbanks showed a fire and smoke coming from engine one. A bright light then was emitted from the location and the aircraft soon entered a sharp left turn of over 90° before exiting the camera frame.

The NTSB looked over the maintenance history of N3054V. Two weeks prior to the accident, engine one was replaced with a serviceable engine, and one week prior to the accident, it was replaced with an overhauled engine by Anderson Aeromotive. According to Alaska Air Fuel's director of operations, a fuel leak had developed in the outboard fuel tank of the left wing near engine one. A repair was attempted the day before the aircraft flew into Fairbanks, but it did not fix the leak. When the outboard fuel tank was full, as it was for several days prior to the accident, fuel dripped out of it at a rate of between five and ten drops of fuel per minute. These drops of fuel entered the space behind engine one.

Engine one was recovered from the wreckage and examined by the NTSB after the accident. Most components of the engine did not show any signs of pre-impact damage. Inside the propeller feathering system, the AN bulkhead fitting had a B-nut installed, but it was not attached to the corresponding oil hose. The exhaust system was covered by external oil residue and the propellers were situated between the feathered and unfeathered position. The propeller feathering system of the aircraft utilizes an oil hose that connects to the feathering pump mounted on the engine firewall. Oil flows through the system to feather the propeller when commanded.

The NTSB concluded that engine one lost power shortly after takeoff for reasons that could not be determined due to post-impact damage and fire. The crew then attempted to feather the engine in order to reduce drag. When the feathering pump activated, the incorrectly installed B-nut resulted in the hose producing a spray of oil around the exhaust system. The fire that started eventually made contact with the fuel that had dripped into the space behind engine one, igniting it. The explosion resulted in the separation of the aileron bell housing, causing a loss of control and impact with terrain.

== Aftermath ==
Officials from the Alaska Department of Natural Resources and the Alaska Department of Environmental Conservation (ADEC) visited the crash site the day after the accident to assess the environmental impacts of the fuel. Initial assessments determined most of the fuel was consumed by the post-crash fire, with only small patches floating on the Tanana River. Organic material on the surface was burned during the fire. The ADEC announced that it would not clean up the crash site, citing the low amounts of fuel and the difficult terrain to conduct such operations. The NTSB planned to coordinate with Alaska Air Fuel's insurance company to remove the wreckage from the crash site, which was done on June 13 and 14.
