= Shungnak Airport =

Airport in Alaska, United States

- IATA: SHG; ICAO: PAGH; FAA LID: SHG

Summary
- Airport type: Public
- Owner: State of Alaska DOT&PF
- Serves: Shungnak, Alaska
- Elevation AMSL: 197 ft (60 m)
- Coordinates: 66°53′17″N 157°09′45″W

Map
- Location of airport in Alaska

Runways
Direction	Length		Surface
Direction	ft	m	Surface
9/27	4,000	1,219	Gravel
- Source: Federal Aviation Administration

Shungnak Airport (IATA: SHG, ICAO: PAGH, FAA LID: SHG) (Iñupiaq: Isiŋnam Mirvia or Nuurviuram Mirvia) is a state-owned public-use airport located in Shungnak, a city in the Northwest Arctic of the U.S. state of Alaska.

== Facilities ==
Shungnak Airport has one runway designated 9/27 with a 4,000 x 60 ft (1,219 x 18 m) gravel surface.

== Airlines and destinations ==
Airlines	Destinations
Bering Air	Ambler, Kobuk, Kotzebue

== See also ==
- List of airports in Alaska
