= Ikpikpuk River =

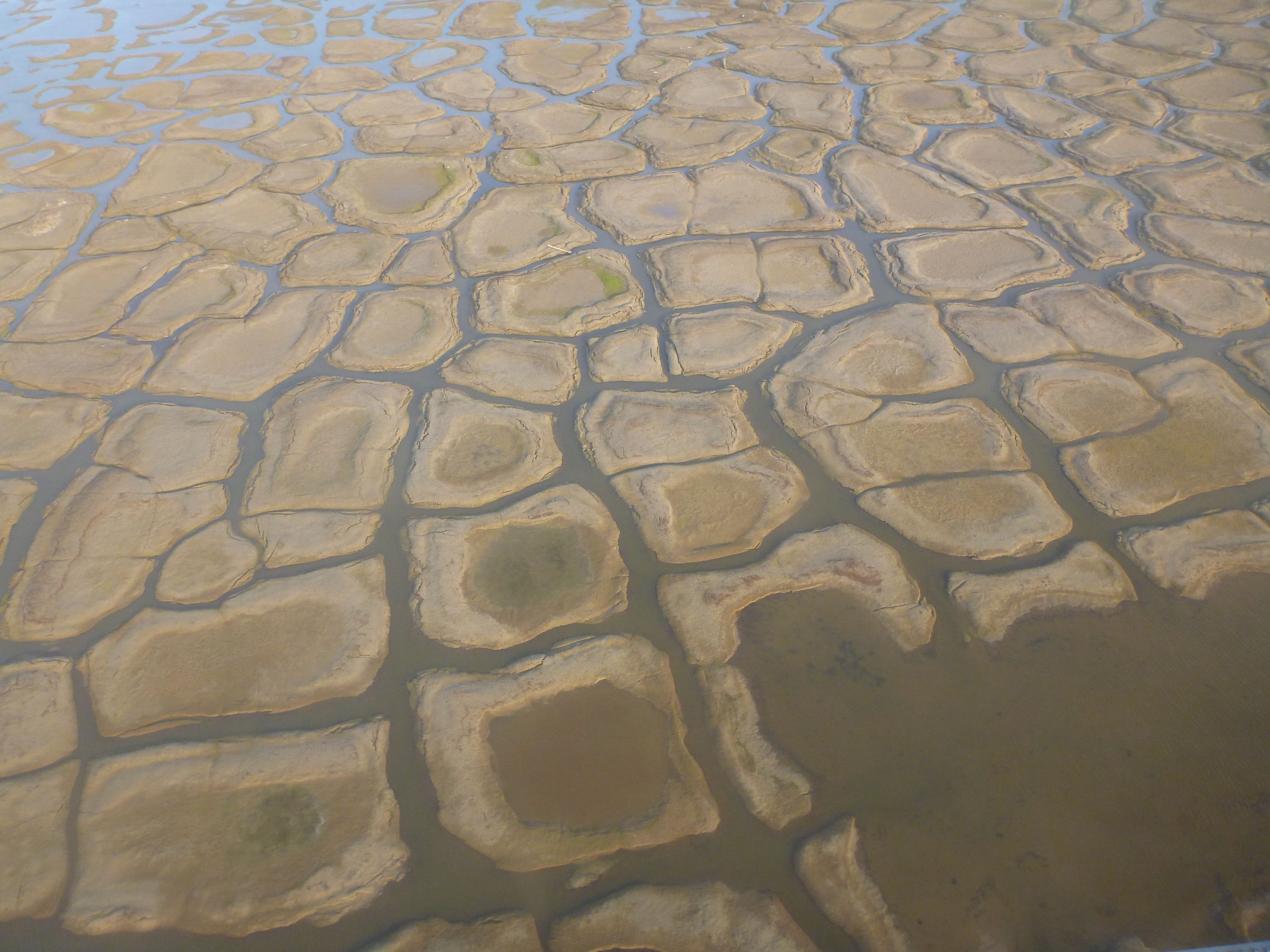
- Melting ice wedges on the Ikpikpuk River delta, August 2013
- Etymology: North Slope Iñupiaq: "big cliff or bank": from ikpik, "bluff" or "steep riverbank" + -qpak, "huge"
- Native name: Ikpikpak (North Alaskan Inupiatun)

Location
- Country: United States
- State: Alaska
- Borough: North Slope

Physical characteristics
- Source: Confluence of Kigalik River and Maybe Creek
  - coordinates: 69°20′11″N 154°40′48″W
- Mouth: Smith Bay, Beaufort Sea, Arctic Ocean
  - location: South of Cape Simpson
  - coordinates: 70°49′25″N 154°18′09″W
  - elevation: 0 ft (0 m)
- Length: 195 mi (314 km)
- Basin size: 8,768 sq mi (22,710 km^{2})

Basin features
- Tributaries
  - left: Bronx Creek, Titaluk River
  - right: Kay Creek, Fry Creek, Price River, Miguakiak River

The Ikpikpuk River (North Slope Iñupiaq: Ikpikpak) is a river on the Alaska North Slope in the United States. Approximately 195 miles (314 km) long, it drains 8,768 square miles (22,710 km^{2}) of tundra within the National Petroleum Reserve–Alaska on the north side of the Brooks Range, emptying into the western Beaufort Sea 65 miles (105 km) southeast of Utqiagvik.

== Course and drainage ==
The Ikpikpuk River is formed by the confluence of Kigalik River and Maybe Creek in the foothills north of the Colville River. It is the largest river on the Alaska North Slope that originates within the Arctic foothills tundra. It takes a meandering course north across the Arctic coastal tundra, eroding mostly Quaternary deposits along the way and exposing significant Pleistocene mammoth and other mammalian remains.

The middle section of the Ikpikpuk forms the western border of the Ikpikpuk Sand Sea, an area of stabilized sand dunes lying north of Price River, a right tributary of the Ikpikpuk. Covering an area of over 5,800 square miles (15,000 km^{2}), it is the largest sand sea in Arctic North America, and its ridge and thermokarst-basin landscape has been proposed as an analog of fretted terrain found on Mars.

The Ikpikpuk's channel network becomes extremely complex as it approaches the Beaufort Sea, owing to the flat terrain of the coast. Two left distributaries, the Chipp and Alaktak rivers, drain into Admiralty Bay south of Dease Inlet. The Chipp River also receives the Oumalik River as a tributary. The main channel of the Ikpikpuk continues north to its fan-shaped delta at Smith Bay, which measures 8 miles (13 km) across and covers an area of 41 square miles (110 km^{2}). Here the Ikpikpuk receives the Miguakiak River, the outlet of Teshekpuk Lake, although the Miguakiak can reverse its flow when flooding occurs on the Ikpikpuk, as it did in 1977.

The Ikpikpuk's drainage basin covers an area of 8,768 square miles (22,710 km^{2}) and has a mean elevation of 250 feet (76 m). It is separated from the Colville River basin to the south by the Knifeblade and Kimikpak ridges.

== Name ==
The North Slope Iñupiat call the river Ikpikpak, meaning "big cliff or bank", from the Iñupiaq word ikpik, "bluff" or "steep riverbank"; and suffix -qpak, "huge". John Murdoch, the naturalist in Patrick Henry Ray's 1881–1883 expedition to Point Barrow, recorded the river's name as Ikpikpûñ. George M. Stoney attempted to rename the river for Charles W. Chipp, but in 1925, the United States Board on Geographic Names reapplied Chipp's name to one of the Ikpikpuk's two distributaries.

== Hydrology ==
Based on 2005–2009 measurements, the mean river discharge at the Ikpikpuk gauge station (NWIS ID#15820000, 69°46′00.5″N 154°39′40.6″W, NAD27) is approximately 25.5 cubic metres per second (900 cu ft/s). Peak flow occurs from late May to early June, during the spring flooding that occurs after the river ice breaks up.

== Wildlife ==
The Ikpikpuk provides habitat for nesting peregrine falcons, as well as many species of shorebirds in the summer. The Ikpikpuk delta hosts the largest colony of snow geese in western North America.

Part of the Teshekpuk caribou herd migrates seasonally through the lower Ikpikpuk basin, and can often be spotted from Isuliumaniq, a large hill east of where the Chipp River distributary branches from the Ikpikpuk River. The summer range of the Western Arctic caribou herd extends into the upper Ikpikpuk basin. Moose, grizzly bear and ptarmigan are observed along the upper Ikpikpuk in the summer.

== Human activity ==
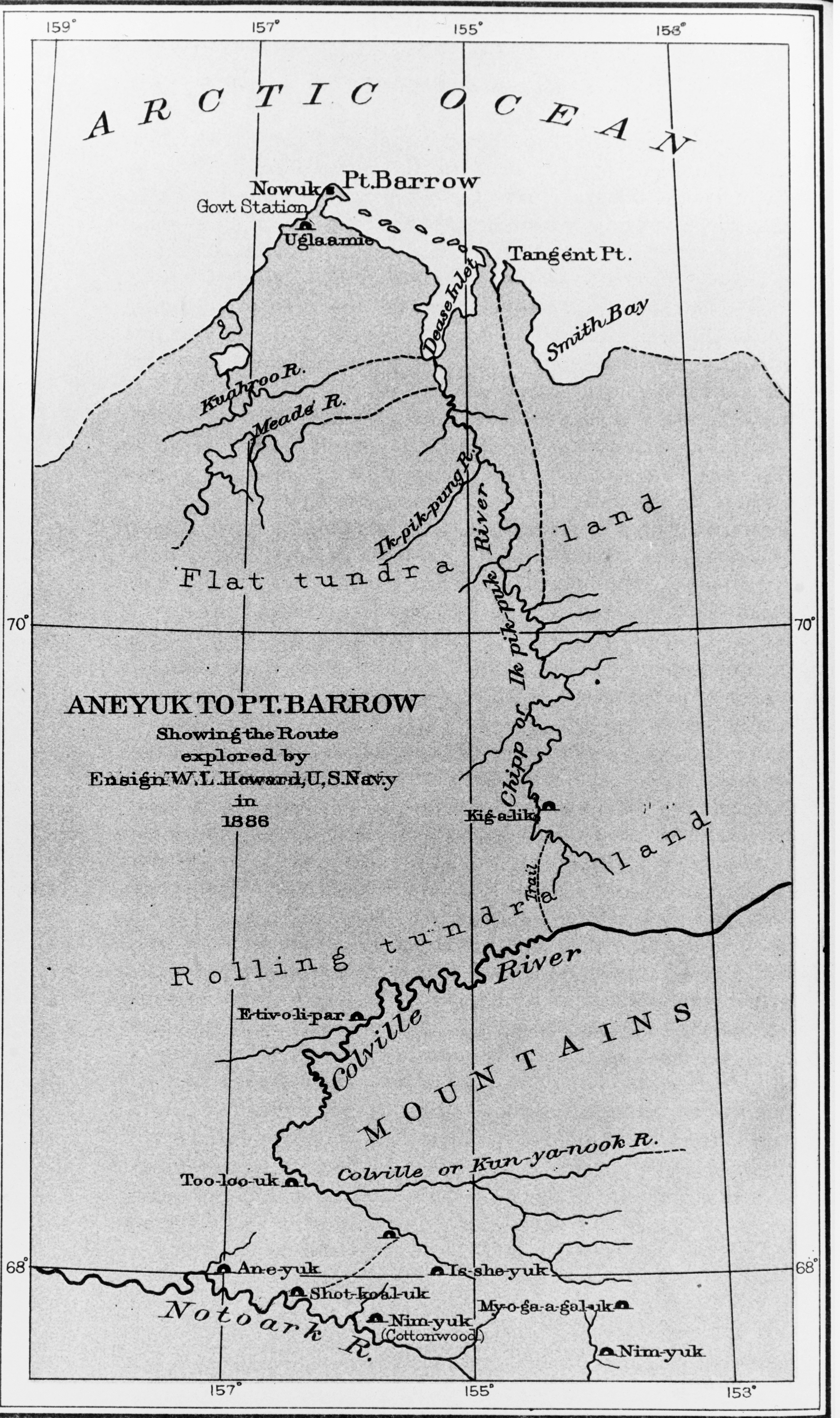
Map of William Lauriston Howard's expedition from the Kobuk River to Point Barrow.

The Ikpikpagmiut, an Iñupiat nation, inhabited the Ikpikpuk River basin in the 19th century. They were a nomadic group that spent summers on the coast and moved inland for the rest of the year, subsisting on fish and caribou. William Lauriston Howard traveled with a group of Iñupiat down the Ikpikpuk and Chipp rivers in June 1886, in the course of his trip from the Kobuk River to Point Barrow.

Nowadays, the Iñupiat continue to fish for broad whitefish on the Ikpikpuk after it freezes over in the fall, using gill nets strung through holes in the ice. One frequently used fishing spot is Iqsiññat on the delta, where the Miguakiak River flows into the Ikpikpuk. The Ikpikpuk River also provides an important access route to the interior for hunters from the coast.

Oil and gas exploration in the Ikpikpuk basin began in 1944, in the area around Maybe Creek. The lower Ikpikpuk basin is protected within the Teshekpuk Lake Special Area, closing it to oil and gas development.

== See also ==
- List of rivers of Alaska
