= Smith Bay =

Estuary in the Beaufort Sea

Coordinates: 70.88°N 154.30°W

Smith Bay is an estuary in the Beaufort Sea that supports a wide range of fish, birds, and marine mammals. It is located northeast of Point Barrow, Alaska. The Bureau of Ocean Energy Management recognizes the southeastern portion of Barrow Canyon, which covers some, but not all, of Smith Bay, as an Environmentally Important Area.

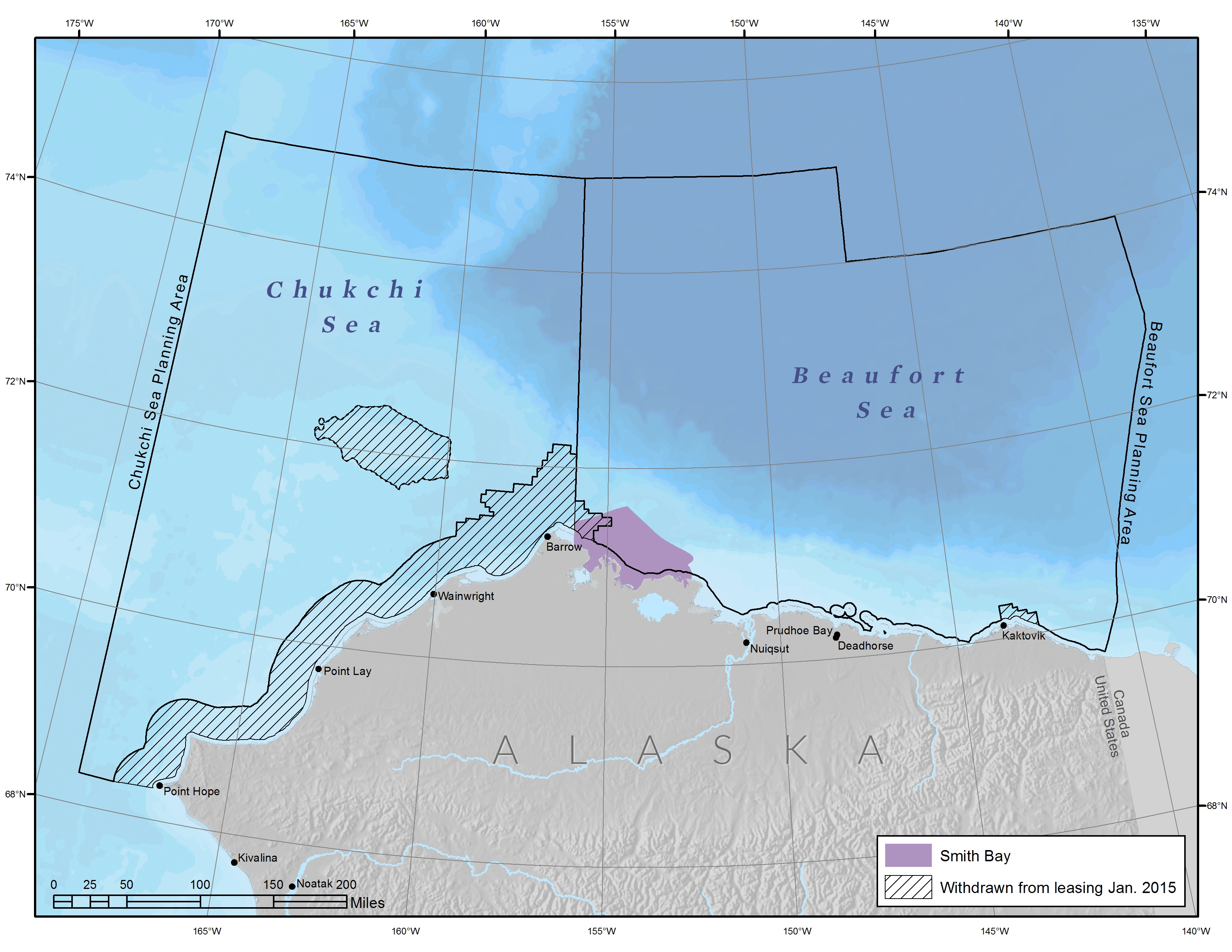
Map of Smith Bay in the Beaufort Sea

== Geography ==
Approximately 150 miles west of Prudhoe Bay, Alaska, Smith Bay stretches from Dease Inlet to Cape Halkett. Bordered by barrier islands that separate the shallow, brackish waters from the Beaufort Sea, several slow-moving rivers flow into this region, most notably the Ikpikpuk River. Along with its adjacent waters, Smith Bay is a shallow-water estuary.

== Fauna ==
Smith Bay is a significant hotspot for pinnipeds. The nearshore areas are important habitat for ringed seals that come to the landfast ice during the winter and spring to give birth.

Polar bears and bowhead whales rely on Smith Bay for important foraging habitat. Polar bears have been observed using Smith Bay as a major maternal denning area to raise their young.

Many species of birds, including yellow-billed loons, king eiders, Arctic terns, black-legged kittiwakes, glaucous and Sabine's gulls, king eiders, long-tailed ducks, and red phalaropes, are found in Smith Bay.

== Oil discovery ==
There is a known oil seep at Cape Simpson on the western side of Smith Bay. In 2015 and 2016, Caelus Energy Alaska drilled two exploration wells in the southern part of the bay, about 59 miles (95 km) southeast of Barrow. In October 2016, the company announced what it called a major oil discovery in the bay and said it would drill a third well in January 2018 and proceed with permitting a pipeline afterwards. A pipeline under the Chukchi Sea or a pipeline on land close to "Qupaluk" ("small bird" in the Inupiaq language) would be required, threatening the habitat of at least 30,000 migratory birds.

The 2016 oil discovery in the deeper Torok Formation of more than 1.0 billion barrels (160 million cubic meters) is less than 1 mile (1.6 km) offshore from the NPR-A. This oil pool is more than three times the size of the Willow project with 300 million barrels (48 million cubic meters).
