= Northwest Arctic Borough School District =

School district in Alaska, United States

Address
- 776 Third Avenue Kotzebue, Alaska, 99752; United States

District information
- Type: Public
- Grades: Pre-K–12
- NCES District ID: 0200625

Students and staff
- Students: 1,945
- Teachers: 122.5
- Staff: 179.0
- Student–teacher ratio: 15.88

Other information
- Website: www.nwarctic.org

Northwest Arctic Borough School District (NWABSD) is a school district headquartered in Kotzebue, Alaska.

In 1999 the district had 2,100 students in nine communities. Beginning circa 1999 the Anchorage company Education Resources Inc. was scheduled to enter a contract with NWABSD so that an employee of the company would act as the superintendent of the school district.

The current superintendent is Terri Walker. One previous superintendent, Mike Dunleavy, is currently serving as governor of Alaska.

== Schools ==
Kotzebue:

- June Nelson Elementary School (JNES)
  - As of 2017 it had 394 students, making it the largest school in the district.
- Kotzebue Middle High School (KMHS)
- Star of the Northwest Magnet School

Rural K-12 schools:

- Ambler School
- Buckland (Nunatchiaq) School
- Deering School
- Kiana School
- Kisimġiugtuq School - Kivalina
- Kobuk School
- Napaaqtugmiut School - Noatak
- Aqaaluk Noorvik School
- Davis-Ramoth Memorial School - Selawik
- Shungnak School

Other facilities:

- Alaska Technical Center - Kotzebue
- NWABSD Home School
