= Deering, Alaska =

City in Alaska, United States

Deering Ipnatchiaq
- City
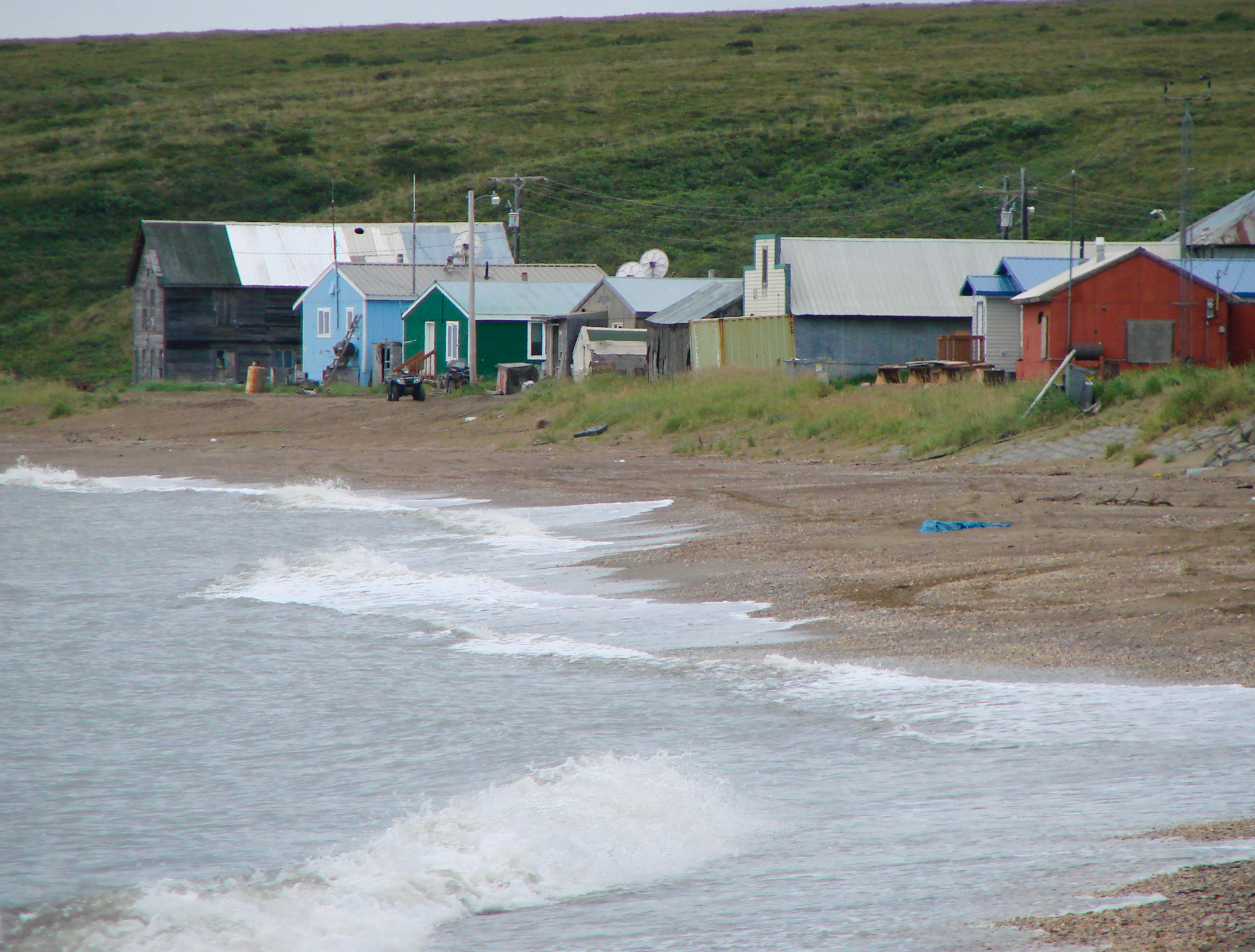
- Houses along the Chukchi Sea in Deering

- Location in Northwest Arctic Borough and the state of Alaska.
- Coordinates: 66°4′33″N 162°43′6″W
- Country: United States
- State: Alaska
- Borough: Northwest Arctic
- Incorporated: October 28, 1970

Government
  - Mayor: Kevin Moto, Sr.
  - State senator: Donny Olson (D)
  - State rep.: Robyn Burke (D)

Area
  - Total: 5.09 sq mi (13.18 km^{2})
  - Land: 5.02 sq mi (12.99 km^{2})
  - Water: 0.073 sq mi (0.19 km^{2})
- Elevation: 6.6 ft (2 m)

Population (2020)
  - Total: 182
  - Density: 36.3/sq mi (14.01/km^{2})
- Time zone: UTC-9 (Alaska (AKST))
  - Summer (DST): UTC-8 (AKDT)
- ZIP code: 99736
- Area code: 907
- FIPS code: 02-18510
- GNIS feature ID: 1412894

Deering (Inupiaq: Ipnatchiaq or Ipnasiaq) is a city in the Northwest Arctic Borough in the U.S. state of Alaska. It is located on a sandy spit on the Seward Peninsula where the Inmachuk River flows into Kotzebue Sound, 92 km (57 mi) southwest of Kotzebue.

As of the 2020 census, the population was 182, up from 136 in 2000. As of 2003, the city includes a community hall, a clinic run by the U.S. Public Health Service, a post office, a church, two stores, and a National Guard armory.

== Culture ==
The inhabitants are primarily Iñupiat. The people are active in subsistence. The sale or importation of alcohol is banned in the city.

== History ==
The city was established in 1901 as a supply station for interior gold mining called "Yutica" near the historic Malemiut Eskimo village of Inmachukmiut. The name probably comes from the schooner Abbie M. Deering, which was present in the area at that time; see #The Abbie M. Deering. Deering was incorporated as a fourth-class city in 1970. It also has a city council, organized under the Indian Reorganization Act of 1934.

== Geography ==
Deering is located at 66°4′33″N 162°43′6″W (66.075713, -162.718229).

=== Climate ===
Climate data for Deering Airport, Alaska (1991–2020 normals, extremes 1998–present)
Month	Jan	Feb	Mar	Apr	May	Jun	Jul	Aug	Sep	Oct	Nov	Dec	Year
Record high °F (°C)	52 (11)	57 (14)	49 (9)	54 (12)	70 (21)	79 (26)	85 (29)	81 (27)	65 (18)	58 (14)	46 (8)	45 (7)	85 (29)
Mean daily maximum °F (°C)	3.8 (−15.7)	9.1 (−12.7)	8.1 (−13.3)	21.9 (−5.6)	40.4 (4.7)	55.7 (13.2)	62.0 (16.7)	57.3 (14.1)	48.4 (9.1)	33.6 (0.9)	20.5 (−6.4)	9.5 (−12.5)	30.9 (−0.6)
Daily mean °F (°C)	−3.9 (−19.9)	0.7 (−17.4)	−0.1 (−17.8)	14.4 (−9.8)	33.1 (0.6)	46.9 (8.3)	53.7 (12.1)	49.8 (9.9)	41.4 (5.2)	27.5 (−2.5)	12.8 (−10.7)	1.7 (−16.8)	23.2 (−4.9)
Mean daily minimum °F (°C)	−11.6 (−24.2)	−7.8 (−22.1)	−8.3 (−22.4)	6.9 (−13.9)	25.8 (−3.4)	38.1 (3.4)	45.4 (7.4)	42.4 (5.8)	34.4 (1.3)	21.3 (−5.9)	5.1 (−14.9)	−6.1 (−21.2)	15.5 (−9.2)
Record low °F (°C)	−47 (−44)	−48 (−44)	−36 (−38)	−25 (−32)	−9 (−23)	21 (−6)	29 (−2)	25 (−4)	16 (−9)	−15 (−26)	−30 (−34)	−43 (−42)	−48 (−44)
Source 1: NOAA
Source 2: xmACIS2

According to the United States Census Bureau, the city has a total area of 5.3 square miles (14 km^{2}), of which, 5.1 square miles (13 km^{2}) of it is land and 0.1 square miles (0.26 km^{2}) of it (2.28%) is water.

== Demographics ==
Historical population
Census	Pop.	Note	%±
1910	100		—
1920	73		−27.0%
1930	183		150.7%
1940	230		25.7%
1950	174		−24.3%
1960	95		−45.4%
1970	85		−10.5%
1980	150		76.5%
1990	157		4.7%
2000	136		−13.4%
2010	122		−10.3%
2020	182		49.2%
U.S. Decennial Census

Deering first appeared on the 1910 U.S. Census as an unincorporated city. It incorporated in 1970.

=== 2020 census ===
As of the 2020 census, Deering had a population of 182. The median age was 26.3 years. 40.1% of residents were under the age of 18 and 9.3% of residents were 65 years of age or older. For every 100 females there were 127.5 males, and for every 100 females age 18 and over there were 122.4 males age 18 and over.

0.0% of residents lived in urban areas, while 100.0% lived in rural areas.

There were 54 households in Deering, of which 57.4% had children under the age of 18 living in them. Of all households, 22.2% were married-couple households, 38.9% were households with a male householder and no spouse or partner present, and 27.8% were households with a female householder and no spouse or partner present. About 24.1% of all households were made up of individuals and 11.1% had someone living alone who was 65 years of age or older.

There were 72 housing units, of which 25.0% were vacant. The homeowner vacancy rate was 0.0% and the rental vacancy rate was 0.0%.

Racial composition as of the 2020 census
Race	Number	Percent
White	6	3.3%
Black or African American	0	0.0%
American Indian and Alaska Native	168	92.3%
Asian	1	0.5%
Native Hawaiian and Other Pacific Islander	0	0.0%
Some other race	0	0.0%
Two or more races	7	3.8%
Hispanic or Latino (of any race)	0	0.0%

=== 2000 census ===
As of the census of 2000, there were 136 people, 42 households, and 28 families residing in the city. The population density was 26.5 inhabitants per square mile (10.2/km^{2}). There were 61 housing units at an average density of 11.9 per square mile (4.6/km^{2}). The racial makeup of the city was 93.38% Native American (Iñupiat), 5.88% White, and 0.74% from two or more races.

There were 42 households, out of which 40.5% had children under the age of 18 living with them, 21.4% were married couples living together, 33.3% had a female householder with no husband present, and 31.0% were non-families. 23.8% of all households were made up of individuals, and 2.4% had someone living alone who was 65 years of age or older. The average household size was 3.24 and the average family size was 3.90.

In the city the age distribution of the population shows 39.7% under the age of 18, 6.6% from 18 to 24, 28.7% from 25 to 44, 17.6% from 45 to 64, and 7.4% who were 65 years of age or older. The median age was 27 years. For every 100 females, there were 109.2 males. For every 100 females age 18 and over, there were 115.8 males.

The median income for a household in the city was $33,333, and the median income for a family was $43,438. Males had a median income of $26,875 versus $25,625 for females. The per capita income for the village was $11,000. None of the families but 5.8% of the population were below the poverty line. No one under the age of 18 or over 64 were living below the poverty line.

== The Abbie M. Deering ==
A first-hand account written by Captain James D. Winchester and published in 1900 tells that the Abbie M. Deering was bought by a company of twenty men who wanted to sail to the "Alaskan Gold Fields" during the Klondike Gold Rush. They left Lynn, Massachusetts in November 1897, passed through the Straits of Magellan, and arrived at San Francisco five months later, where they sold the ship. Records kept by the Minerals Management Service of the U.S. Department of the Interior show the schooner did make it to Alaska, where it was lost in the Aleutian Islands in September 1903.

Rudyard Kipling's 1897 novel Captains Courageous mentions the Abbie M. Deering by name.

== Education ==
The Deering School, operated by the Northwest Arctic Borough School District, serves the community. As of 2017 it had 4 teachers and 50 students, with Alaska Natives making up 100% of the student body.
