= Noorvik, Alaska =

City in Alaska, United States

Noorvik Nuurvik
- City
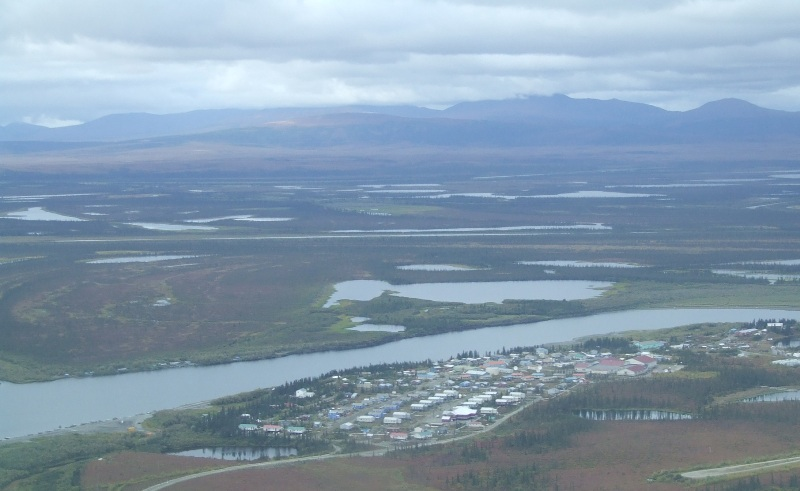
- Aerial view of Noorvik in 2011

- Location in Northwest Arctic Borough and the state of Alaska.
- Coordinates: 66°50′00″N 161°2′45″W
- Country: United States
- State: Alaska
- Borough: Northwest Arctic
- Incorporated: March 11, 1964

Government
  - Mayor: Vern Cleveland
  - Tribal president: Wilber Howarth Sr.
  - State senator: Donny Olson (D)
  - State rep.: Robyn Burke (D)

Area
  - Total: 1.27 sq mi (3.28 km^{2})
  - Land: 0.84 sq mi (2.17 km^{2})
  - Water: 0.43 sq mi (1.11 km^{2})
- Elevation: 0 ft (0 m)

Population (2020)
  - Total: 694
  - Density: 827.9/sq mi (319.65/km^{2})
- Time zone: UTC-9 (Alaska (AKST))
  - Summer (DST): UTC-8 (AKDT)
- ZIP code: 99763
- Area code: 907
- FIPS code: 02-55140
- GNIS feature ID: 1413646

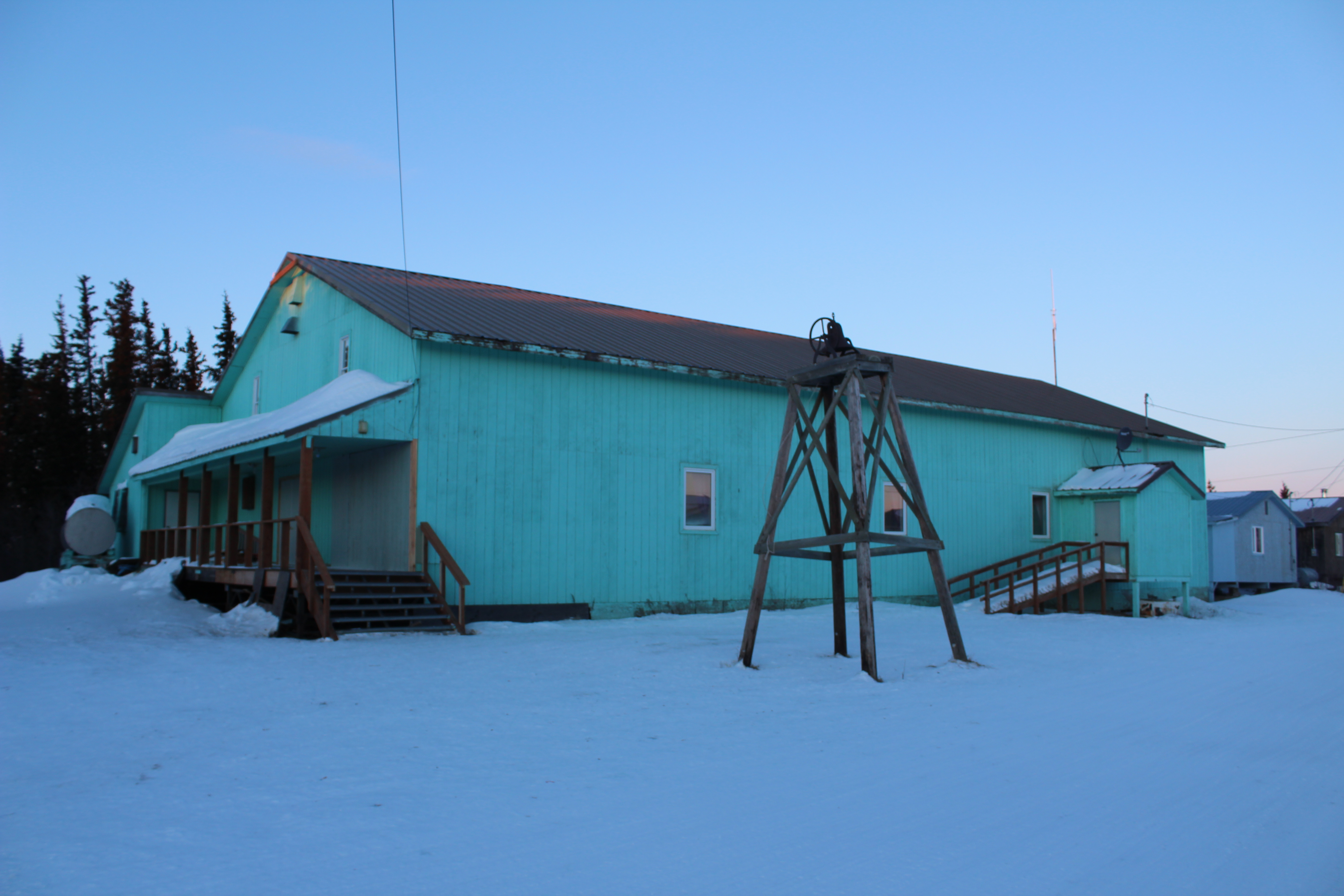
The Friends' Church in Noorvik

Noorvik (Inupiaq: Nuurvik, meaning "A place to move to") is an Iñupiat city in the Northwest Arctic Borough in the U.S. state of Alaska. As of the 2020 census, the population of the city was 694, up from 668 in 2010. Located in the NANA Region Corp, Noorvik has close ties with the largest city in the region, Kotzebue. Residents speak a dialect of Iñupiaq known as Noorvik Inupiaq. Noorvik was the first town to be counted in the 2010 census.

== Geography ==
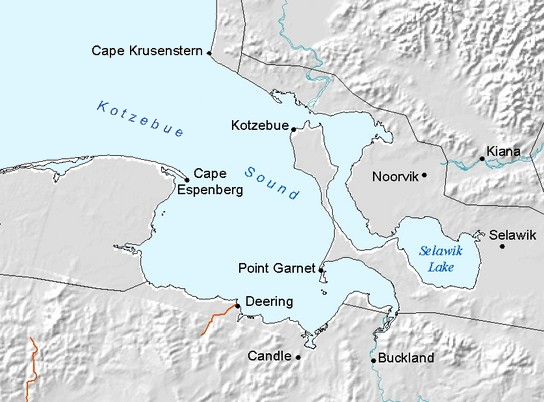
Map showing Kotzebue Sound and the town of Noorvik

Noorvik is located at 66°50′14″N 161°2′12″W (66.837130, -161.036641).

Noorvik is located on the right bank of the Nazuruk Channel of the Kobuk River, 76 km (47 mi) east of Kotzebue.

According to the United States Census Bureau, the city has a total area of 1.3 square miles (3.4 km^{2}), of which, 1.0 square mile (2.6 km^{2}) of it is land and 0.4 square miles (1.0 km^{2}) of it (28.36%) is water.

== Demographics ==
Historical population
Census	Pop.	Note	%±
1920	281		—
1930	198		−29.5%
1940	211		6.6%
1950	248		17.5%
1960	384		54.8%
1970	462		20.3%
1980	492		6.5%
1990	531		7.9%
2000	634		19.4%
2010	668		5.4%
2020	694		3.9%
U.S. Decennial Census

Noorvik first appeared on the 1920 U.S. Census as an unincorporated village. It formally incorporated in 1964.

=== 2020 census ===
As of the 2020 census, Noorvik had a population of 694. The median age was 23.9 years. 42.4% of residents were under the age of 18 and 8.2% of residents were 65 years of age or older. For every 100 females there were 124.6 males, and for every 100 females age 18 and over there were 126.0 males age 18 and over.

0.0% of residents lived in urban areas, while 100.0% lived in rural areas.

There were 163 households in Noorvik, of which 61.3% had children under the age of 18 living in them. Of all households, 41.1% were married-couple households, 24.5% were households with a male householder and no spouse or partner present, and 17.2% were households with a female householder and no spouse or partner present. About 20.3% of all households were made up of individuals and 7.3% had someone living alone who was 65 years of age or older.

There were 176 housing units, of which 7.4% were vacant. The homeowner vacancy rate was 0.0% and the rental vacancy rate was 0.0%.

Racial composition as of the 2020 census
Race	Number	Percent
White	15	2.2%
Black or African American	0	0.0%
American Indian and Alaska Native	672	96.8%
Asian	0	0.0%
Native Hawaiian and Other Pacific Islander	0	0.0%
Some other race	0	0.0%
Two or more races	7	1.0%
Hispanic or Latino (of any race)	0	0.0%

=== 2000 census ===
As of the 2000 census, there were 634 people in 136 households, including 113 families, in the city. The population density was 658.7 inhabitants per square mile (254.3/km^{2}). There were 157 housing units at an average density of 163.1 per square mile (63.0/km^{2}). The racial makeup of the city was 4.89% White, 90.06% Native American, 4.89% from two or more races, and 0.16% Pacific Islander.

Of the 136 households 58.1% had children under the age of 18 living with them, 51.5% were married couples living together, 18.4% had a female householder with no husband present, and 16.9% were non-families. 14.7% of households were one person and 1.5% were one person aged 65 or older. The average household size was 4.66 and the average family size was 5.19.

In the city, the age distribution of the population shows 44.5% under the age of 18, 10.6% from 18 to 24, 26.2% from 25 to 44, 11.5% from 45 to 64, and 7.3% 65 or older. The median age was 21 years. For every 100 females, there were 135.7 males. For every 100 females age 18 and over, there were 134.7 males.

The median household income was $51,964 and the median family income was $52,708. Males had a median income of $34,750 versus $24,583 for females. The per capita income for the city was $12,020. About 9.4% of families and 7.6% of the population were below the poverty line, including 8.6% of those under age 18 and 3.8% of those age 65 or over.

== History ==
Noorvik means "a place that is moved to" in Inupiaq. The village was established by Kowagmuit Inupiat fishermen and hunters from Deering in the early 1900s. Other settlers came from Oksik, a few miles upriver. The area had previously been inhabited by Kuuŋmuit Inupiaq up until the beginning of the 20th century, whose organized settlements had largely disappeared by the turn of the century due to famine and a flu outbreak. However, the village tribal association has founded itself on "the legacy of the Kuuŋmuit Inuit," including basing their logo on a map of the Kuuŋmuit's former territory.

== Education ==
The Aqqaluk Noorvik School, operated by the Northwest Arctic Borough School District, serves the community. As of 2017 it had 12 teachers and 186 students, with Alaska Natives and Native Americans, making up 94% and 1% of the student body respectively

== Transport ==
The city includes the Robert (Bob) Curtis Memorial Airport, also known as the Noorvik Airport, 1 mile southeast from the city.
