= Shungnak, Alaska =

City in Alaska, United States

Shungnak Isiŋnaq / Nuurviuraq
- City
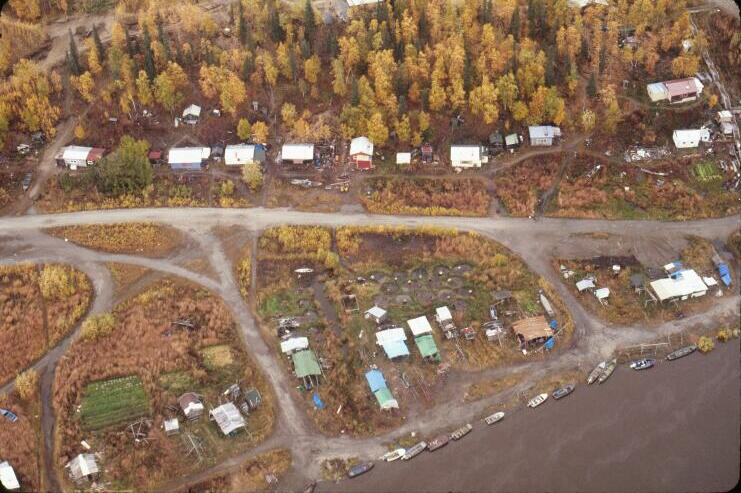
- Aerial view of Shungnak in the fall

- Location in Northwest Arctic Borough and the state of Alaska.
- Coordinates: 66°53′9″N 157°8′15″W
- Country: United States
- State: Alaska
- Borough: Northwest Arctic
- Incorporated: May 4, 1967

Government
  - Mayor: Melvin Lee
  - State senator: Donny Olson (D)
  - State rep.: Robyn Burke (D)

Area
  - Total: 8.98 sq mi (23.26 km^{2})
  - Land: 8.05 sq mi (20.85 km^{2})
  - Water: 0.93 sq mi (2.41 km^{2})
- Elevation: 144 ft (44 m)

Population (2020)
  - Total: 272
  - Density: 33.8/sq mi (13.04/km^{2})
- Time zone: UTC-9 (Alaska (AKST))
  - Summer (DST): UTC-8 (AKDT)
- ZIP code: 99773
- Area code: 907
- FIPS code: 02-70100
- GNIS feature ID: 1413983

Shungnak (Inupiaq: Isiŋnaq or Nuurviuraq) is a city in Northwest Arctic Borough, Alaska, United States. As of the 2020 census, Shungnak had a population of 272.

== History ==
Shungnak originally was settled in 1899, approximately 10 miles to the east along the Kobuk River. The name "Shungnak" is derived from Iñupiaq term Isiŋnaq which means jade, a stone found in the surrounding area. In the 1920s, erosion along the river caused many residents to abandon the old townsite. In 1927, they resettled at a site originally known as "Kochuk." Residents decided to rename Kochuk as the new Shungnak. At the old Shungnak village, some residents chose to remain. To avoid confusion between the two villages, Old Shungnak became Kobuk in 1928.

Shungnak officially incorporated in 1967.

== Geography ==
Shungnak is located at 66°53′09″N 157°08′15″W

According to the United States Census Bureau, the city has a total area of 9.6 square miles (25 km^{2}), of which 8.4 square miles (22 km^{2}) is land and 1.3 square miles (3.4 km^{2}) of it (13.10%) is water.

The town is located about 150 miles east of Kotzebue.

== Demographics ==
Historical population
Census	Pop.	Note	%±
1930	145		—
1940	193		33.1%
1950	141		−26.9%
1960	135		−4.3%
1970	165		22.2%
1980	202		22.4%
1990	223		10.4%
2000	256		14.8%
2010	262		2.3%
2020	272		3.8%
U.S. Decennial Census

The present Shungnak first appeared on the 1930 U.S. Census as an unincorporated village. The Shungnak listed on the 1910 and 1920 censuses was for the Old Shungnak, which became Kobuk in 1928. This Shungnak has reported on every census since 1930. It was formally incorporated as a city in 1967.

=== 2020 census ===
As of the 2020 census, Shungnak had a population of 272. The median age was 24.5 years. 39.0% of residents were under the age of 18 and 8.5% of residents were 65 years of age or older. For every 100 females there were 88.9 males, and for every 100 females age 18 and over there were 95.3 males age 18 and over.

0.0% of residents lived in urban areas, while 100.0% lived in rural areas.

There were 72 households in Shungnak, of which 55.6% had children under the age of 18 living in them. Of all households, 18.1% were married-couple households, 26.4% were households with a male householder and no spouse or partner present, and 37.5% were households with a female householder and no spouse or partner present. About 20.8% of all households were made up of individuals and 4.2% had someone living alone who was 65 years of age or older.

There were 89 housing units, of which 19.1% were vacant. The homeowner vacancy rate was 0.0% and the rental vacancy rate was 8.8%.

Racial composition as of the 2020 census
Race	Number	Percent
White	6	2.2%
Black or African American	0	0.0%
American Indian and Alaska Native	259	95.2%
Asian	0	0.0%
Native Hawaiian and Other Pacific Islander	0	0.0%
Some other race	0	0.0%
Two or more races	7	2.6%
Hispanic or Latino (of any race)	1	0.4%

=== 2000 census ===
As of the census of 2000, there were 256 people, 56 households, and 51 families residing in the city. The population density was 30.6 inhabitants per square mile (11.8/km^{2}). There were 64 housing units at an average density of 7.7 per square mile (3.0/km^{2}). The racial makeup of the city was 5.47% White and 94.53% Alaska Native.

Of those 56 households, 66.1% had children under the age of 18 living with them, 53.6% were married couples living together, 16.1% had a female householder with no husband present, and 8.9% were non-families. In addition, 7.1% of all households were made up of individuals, and 1.8% had someone living alone who was 65 years of age or older. The average household size was 4.57 and the average family size was 4.53.

In the city, the age distribution of the population shows 48.4% under the age of 18; 8.6% from 18 to 24; 23.8% from 25 to 44; 12.9% from 45 to 64; and 6.3% who were 65 years of age or older. The median age was 19 years. For every 100 females age 18 and over, there were 103.1 males.

The median income for a household in the city was $44,375, and the median income for a family was $41,000. Males had a median income of $25,750 versus $33,750 for females. The per capita income for the city was $10,377. About 21.7% of families and 35.8% of the population were below the poverty line, including 46.2% of those under the age of eighteen and none of those 65 or over.

== Economics ==
Shungnak has a “mixed economy” in which market, subsistence, and public sectors all contribute to individual well-being. The most comprehensive community economy data come from household surveys by the Division of Subsistence in the Alaska Department of Fish and Game (ADF&G). The Division administered a comprehensive socio-economic survey to 46 of 69 Shungnak households (66.7%) in 2013. For the calendar year 2012, ADF&G estimated a total community income of $4.1 million, with a median household income of $50,091. Estimated per capita income in 2012 was $15,009. Earned income contributed an estimated 71% of the total, including income from local government (26.7%), services (22.0%), and mining (11.3%). Other (unearned) income contributed an estimated 28.7% of the total, including Native corporation dividends (6.7%), food stamps (5.6%), and the Alaska Permanent Fund Dividend (4.9%). For comparison, in 2021 the American Community Survey estimated the five-year median household income in Shungnak to be $60,938 (±$8,736).

For calendar year 2012, the ADF&G survey estimated that Shungnak residents harvested 100,872 lb (±30%) of wild food, or about 368 lb per person. The top five wild foods by estimated edible weight were caribou (53,802 lb, 53% of the total), sheefish (17,334 lb, 17%), chum salmon (14,747 lb, 15%), broad whitefish (2,842 lb, 3%), and moose (2,421 lb, 2%). All of surveyed households reported harvesting at least one kind of wild food for personal or family consumption. On average, households reported harvesting 7 and using 13 kinds of wildlife foods (the most reported by a single household was 27 kinds of wild food).

The ADF&G survey included questions intended to assess households’ food security. During the 2012 study year, an estimated 86% of Shungnak Households were identified as being food secure. Of the remaining households, 7% exhibited low food security, and 7% had very low food security. The percentage of food-secure households in Shungnak was about the same as in the United States overall, and slightly lower than in the State of Alaska overall (88%). However, the percentage of households in Shungnak reporting “very low” food security was higher in Shungnak (7%) than in the nation (6%) or in the State of Alaska (4%).

The Division of Subsistence administered a similar comprehensive survey in Shungnak in 2003.

== Facilities ==
The Shungnak School, operated by the Northwest Arctic Borough School District, serves the community. As of 2017 it had 7 teachers and 86 students, with Alaska Natives making up 95% of the student body.

The source of municipal water is from a reservoir intermittently filled from the Kobuk River. Previously, there was a water infiltration gallery that was destroyed by ice. Groundwater wells have proven unsuccessful.

The town has a 4,001-ft gravel runway owned by the state of Alaska. In the summer of 2006, only part of a fuel shipment was able to be delivered by barge and the remainder of the town's fuel needs had to be supplied by air. This resulted in the price of gasoline rising to $8.10 per gallon at the town's only filling station in 2006–07. In the summer of 2026, the water levels of the Kobuk River remained too low for barge delivery of fuel. This resulted in the price of gasoline, which has to be delivered by plane, to reach a high of $26.82 per gallon.

A hybrid solar-plus-storage microgrid, funded by the U.S. Department of Agriculture and the Northwest Arctic Borough, supplements diesel power generation. The hybrid solar-plus-storage microgrid utilizes 384 kWh total capacity of energy storage solution and 225 kW solar array.
