= Kobuk, Alaska =

City in Alaska, United States

Kobuk Laugviik
- City
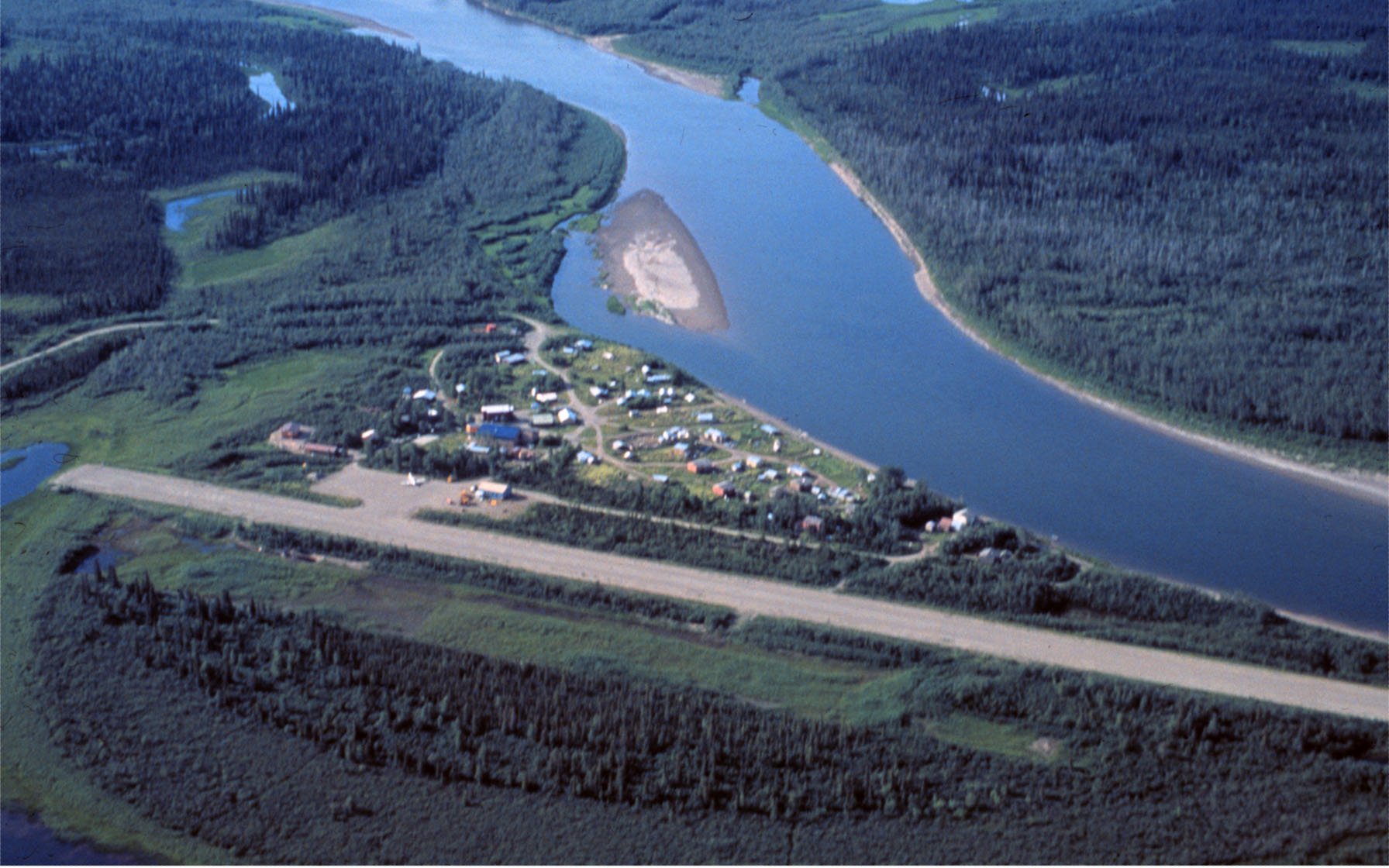
- Aerial view of Kobuk

- Location in Northwest Arctic Borough and the state of Alaska.
- Coordinates: 66°55′3″N 156°54′25″W
- Country: United States
- State: Alaska
- Borough: Northwest Arctic
- Incorporated: September 25, 1973

Government
  - Mayor: Alex Sheldon
  - State senator: Donny Olson (D)
  - State rep.: Robyn Burke (D)

Area
  - Total: 16.02 sq mi (41.49 km^{2})
  - Land: 15.51 sq mi (40.16 km^{2})
  - Water: 0.51 sq mi (1.33 km^{2})
- Elevation: 148 ft (45 m)

Population (2020)
  - Total: 191
  - Density: 12.3/sq mi (4.76/km^{2})
- Time zone: UTC-9 (Alaska (AKST))
  - Summer (DST): UTC-8 (AKDT)
- ZIP code: 99751
- Area code: 907
- FIPS code: 02-40840
- GNIS feature ID: 1413362

Kobuk (Inupiaq: Laugviik) is a city in Northwest Arctic Borough, Alaska, United States. As of the 2020 census, Kobuk had a population of 191.

== History ==
Kobuk was founded in 1899 as the village of Shungnak, a supply point for miners north of the Kobuk River in the Cosmos Hills. A trading post, school, and mission were built and residents came to the settlement. In the 1920s, river erosion led many residents to relocate ten miles downstream (west) to a site called "Kochuk." Kochuk became the new Shungnak, while the original Shungnak became Kobuk in 1928.

In May 1973, a flood covered the entire village. In September of the same year, it incorporated as a city.

The economy of Kobuk is based on subsistence hunting for caribou and moose.

The first postmaster at Kobuk (when it was still called Shungnak) was Martin F. Moran, appointed September 24, 1903.

== Geography and climate ==
Kobuk has a typical subarctic climate (Köppen climate classification: Dfc), bordering on a dry-winter subarctic climate (Köppen climate classification: Dwc).

Kobuk is located at 66°55′3″N 156°54′25″W (66.917579, -156.906829).

Kobuk is located on the bank of the Kobuk River, 10 km (6.2 mi) northeast of Shungnak. It is near Kobuk Valley National Park.

According to the United States Census Bureau, the city has a total area of 16.8 square miles (44 km^{2}), of which, 16.1 square miles (42 km^{2}) of it is land and 0.7 square miles (1.8 km^{2}) of it (4.34%) is water.

The coldest temperature recorded in Kobuk was -68 °F (-56 °C) on March 1, 1971. Kobuk holds the record for the coldest temperature to ever be recorded in the United States in March.

Climate data for Kobuk (1961–1990 normals, extremes 1953–present)
Month	Jan	Feb	Mar	Apr	May	Jun	Jul	Aug	Sep	Oct	Nov	Dec	Year
Record high °F (°C)	39 (4)	38 (3)	45 (7)	59 (15)	79 (26)	90 (32)	93 (34)	90 (32)	73 (23)	55 (13)	42 (6)	40 (4)	92 (33)
Mean maximum °F (°C)	29.3 (−1.5)	26.4 (−3.1)	33.8 (1.0)	46.6 (8.1)	66.3 (19.1)	79.3 (26.3)	81.8 (27.7)	78.7 (25.9)	66.3 (19.1)	43.3 (6.3)	32.8 (0.4)	29.0 (−1.7)	84.3 (29.1)
Mean daily maximum °F (°C)	1.1 (−17.2)	3.1 (−16.1)	13.4 (−10.3)	29.1 (−1.6)	49.8 (9.9)	65.5 (18.6)	68.8 (20.4)	64.1 (17.8)	51.4 (10.8)	28.8 (−1.8)	11.2 (−11.6)	1.7 (−16.8)	32.4 (0.2)
Daily mean °F (°C)	−7.3 (−21.8)	−9.5 (−23.1)	−0.1 (−17.8)	16.0 (−8.9)	39.2 (4.0)	54.1 (12.3)	57.6 (14.2)	53.7 (12.1)	42.2 (5.7)	19.9 (−6.7)	3.7 (−15.7)	−9.3 (−22.9)	21.7 (−5.7)
Mean daily minimum °F (°C)	−18.7 (−28.2)	−20.4 (−29.1)	−12.2 (−24.6)	5.3 (−14.8)	27.0 (−2.8)	41.6 (5.3)	45.1 (7.3)	42.3 (5.7)	32.1 (0.1)	11.8 (−11.2)	−6.0 (−21.1)	−18.4 (−28.0)	10.9 (−11.7)
Mean minimum °F (°C)	−53.6 (−47.6)	−55.1 (−48.4)	−48.4 (−44.7)	−31.2 (−35.1)	11.6 (−11.3)	29.3 (−1.5)	34.1 (1.2)	26.7 (−2.9)	12.0 (−11.1)	−18.8 (−28.2)	−35.8 (−37.7)	−51.8 (−46.6)	−58.1 (−50.1)
Record low °F (°C)	−65 (−54)	−65 (−54)	−68 (−56)	−41 (−41)	−16 (−27)	19 (−7)	29 (−2)	19 (−7)	−5 (−21)	−42 (−41)	−59 (−51)	−60 (−51)	−68 (−56)
Average precipitation inches (mm)	0.54 (14)	0.42 (11)	0.55 (14)	0.66 (17)	0.85 (22)	1.78 (45)	3.11 (79)	3.42 (87)	2.67 (68)	1.05 (27)	0.95 (24)	0.69 (18)	16.69 (424)
Average snowfall inches (cm)	6.8 (17)	4.4 (11)	6.1 (15)	4.7 (12)	0.7 (1.8)	0.1 (0.25)	0.0 (0.0)	0.0 (0.0)	1.9 (4.8)	6.9 (18)	11.7 (30)	7.6 (19)	50.9 (129)
Average precipitation days (≥ 0.01 inch)	5.1	3.4	4.8	5.9	5.3	8.6	11.2	14.1	11.2	7.1	7.8	6.2	90.7
Average snowy days (≥ 0.1 inch)	3.8	2.6	4.0	3.5	0.6	0.1	0.0	0.0	1.0	3.7	6.3	4.5	30.1
Source 1: WRCC
Source 2: XMACIS (snowfall)

== Demographics ==
Historical population
Census	Pop.	Note	%±
1910	210		—
1920	95		−54.8%
1940	31		—
1950	38		22.6%
1960	54		42.1%
1970	56		3.7%
1980	62		10.7%
1990	69		11.3%
2000	109		58.0%
2010	151		38.5%
2020	191		26.5%
U.S. Decennial Census

Kobuk first appeared on the 1910 U.S. Census under its previous name of Shungnak, an unincorporated village. It appeared again on the 1920 U.S. Census. With the departure of many residents in 1927 to the "New" Shungnak site, the old site was renamed Kobuk in 1928. It did not appear on the 1930 census, but did beginning again in 1940. In 1970, Kobuk was erroneously reported as the unincorporated "Shungnak Village" (not to be confused with its neighbor city). In 1973, Kobuk was formally incorporated and has reported as Kobuk in every successive census since 1980.

=== 2020 census ===
As of the 2020 census, Kobuk had a population of 191. The median age was 21.8 years. 41.9% of residents were under the age of 18 and 6.8% of residents were 65 years of age or older. For every 100 females there were 107.6 males, and for every 100 females age 18 and over there were 101.8 males age 18 and over.

0.0% of residents lived in urban areas, while 100.0% lived in rural areas.

There were 41 households in Kobuk, of which 58.5% had children under the age of 18 living in them. Of all households, 36.6% were married-couple households, 9.8% were households with a male householder and no spouse or partner present, and 24.4% were households with a female householder and no spouse or partner present. About 9.7% of all households were made up of individuals and 7.3% had someone living alone who was 65 years of age or older.

There were 53 housing units, of which 22.6% were vacant. The homeowner vacancy rate was 0.0% and the rental vacancy rate was 0.0%.

Racial composition as of the 2020 census
Race	Number	Percent
White	20	10.5%
Black or African American	1	0.5%
American Indian and Alaska Native	160	83.8%
Asian	1	0.5%
Native Hawaiian and Other Pacific Islander	0	0.0%
Some other race	0	0.0%
Two or more races	9	4.7%
Hispanic or Latino (of any race)	5	2.6%

=== 2000 census ===
As of the census of 2000, there were 109 people, 26 households, and 23 families residing in the city. The population density was 6.8 inhabitants per square mile (2.6/km^{2}). There were 45 housing units at an average density of 2.8 per square mile (1.1/km^{2}). The racial makeup of the city was 4.59% White, 93.58% Native American, 0.92% Asian, 0.92% from other races. 4.59% of the population were Hispanic or Latino of any race.

There were 26 households, out of which 61.5% had children under the age of 18 living with them, 46.2% were married couples living together, 30.8% had a female householder with no husband present, and 11.5% were non-families. 11.5% of all households were made up of individuals, and none had someone living alone who was 65 years of age or older. The average household size was 4.19 and the average family size was 4.26.

In the city, the age distribution of the population shows 52.3% under the age of 18, 9.2% from 18 to 24, 18.3% from 25 to 44, 17.4% from 45 to 64, and 2.8% who were 65 years of age or older. The median age was 17 years. For every 100 females, there were 98.2 males. For every 100 females age 18 and over, there were 100.0 males.

The median income for a household in the city was $30,750, and the median income for a family was $20,313. Males had a median income of $71,250 versus $21,875 for females. The per capita income for the city was $9,844. There were 32.0% of families and 28.6% of the population living below the poverty line, including 28.2% of under eighteens and 57.1% of those over 64.

== Education ==
The Kobuk School, operated by the Northwest Arctic Borough School District, serves the community. As of 2017 it had 44 students, with Alaska Natives making up 100% of the student body.
