= Iñupiaq language =

Inuit varieties spoken in Alaska and the Northwest Territories

Iñupiaq
- Uqautchiq Iñupiatun; Uqausiq Iñupiatun; Uqausriq Iñupiatun; Qanġuziq Inupiatun; Qaġnuziq Inupiaqtun; Qanġusiq Inupiatun
- Native to: United States, formerly Russia; Northwest Territories of Canada
- Region: Alaska; formerly Big Diomede Island
- Ethnicity: 20,709 Iñupiat (2015)
- Native speakers: 1,250 fully fluent speakers (2023)
- Language family: Eskaleut: Eskimo; Inuit; Iñupiaq
- Early forms: Proto-Eskimo–Aleut: Proto-Eskimo; Proto-Inuit
- Writing system: Latin (Iñupiaq alphabet); Iñupiaq Braille

Official status
- Official language in: Alaska, Northwest Territories (as Uummarmiutun dialect)

Language codes
- ISO 639-1: ik
- ISO 639-2: ipk
- ISO 639-3: ipk – inclusive code Individual codes: esi – North Alaskan Iñupiatun esk – Northwest Alaska Iñupiatun
- Glottolog: inup1234
- ELP: Inupiaq
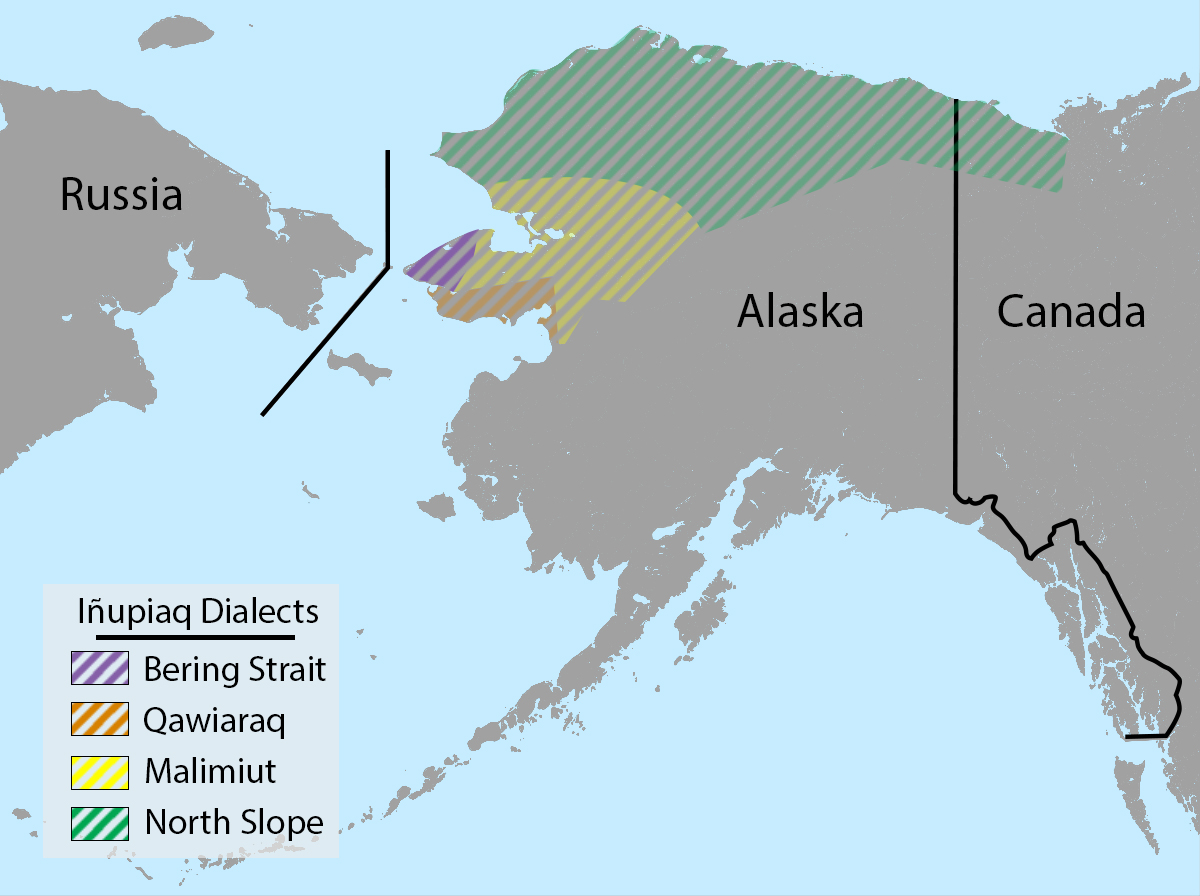

- Iñupiaq dialects and speech communities

iñuk / nuna "person" / "land"
- Person: Iñupiaq; Dual: Iñupiak
- People: Iñupiat
- Language: Iñupiatun
- Country: Iñupiat Nunaat

Iñupiaq or Inupiaq (/ɪ.ˈnuː.pi.æk/ ih-NOO-pee-ak, Inupiaq: [iɲupiaq]), also known as Iñupiat, Inupiat (/ɪ.ˈnuː.pi.æt/ ih-NOO-pee-at), Iñupiatun or Alaskan Inuit, is an Inuit language, or perhaps group of languages, spoken by the Iñupiat people in northern and northwestern Alaska, as well as a small adjacent part of the Northwest Territories of Canada. The Iñupiat language is a member of the Inuit–Yupik–Unangan language family, and is closely related and, to varying degrees, mutually intelligible with other Inuit languages of Canada and Greenland. There are roughly 2,000 speakers. Iñupiaq is considered to be a threatened language, with most speakers at or above the age of 40. Iñupiaq is an official language of the State of Alaska, along with several other indigenous languages.

The major varieties of the Iñupiaq language are the North Slope Iñupiaq and Seward Peninsula Iñupiaq dialects.

The Iñupiaq language has been in decline since contact with English in the late 19th century. American territorial acquisition and the legacy of boarding schools have created a situation today where a small minority of Iñupiat speak the Iñupiaq language. There is, however, revitalization work underway today in several communities.

== History ==
The Iñupiaq language is an Inuit language, the ancestors of which may have been spoken in the northern regions of Alaska for as long as 5,000 years. Between 1,000 and 800 years ago, Inuit migrated east from Alaska to Canada and Greenland, eventually occupying the entire Arctic coast and much of the surrounding inland areas. The Iñupiaq dialects are the most conservative forms of the Inuit language, with less linguistic change than the other Inuit languages.

In the mid to late 19th century, Russian, British, and American colonists made contact with Iñupiat people. In 1885, the American territorial government appointed Rev. Sheldon Jackson as General Agent of Education. Under his administration, Iñupiat people (and all Alaska Natives) were educated in English-only environments, forbidding the use of Iñupiaq and other indigenous languages of Alaska. After decades of English-only education, with strict punishment if heard speaking Iñupiaq, after the 1970s, most Iñupiat did not pass the Iñupiaq language on to their children, for fear of them being punished for speaking their language.

In 1972, the Alaska Legislature passed legislation mandating that if "a [school is attended] by at least 15 pupils whose primary language is other than English, [then the school] shall have at least one teacher who is fluent in the native language".

Today, the University of Alaska Fairbanks offers bachelor's degrees in Iñupiaq language and culture, while a preschool/kindergarten-level Iñupiaq immersion school named Nikaitchuat Iḷisaġviat teaches grades PreK–1st grade in Kotzebue.

In 2014, Iñupiaq became an official language of the State of Alaska, alongside English and nineteen other indigenous languages. In the same year, Iñupiat linguist and educator Edna Ahgeak MacLean published an Iñupiaq–English grammar and dictionary with over 19,000 entries. An online version was later released by her.

In 2018, Facebook added Iñupiaq as a language option on their website. In 2022, an Iñupiaq version of Wordle was created.

== Dialects ==
There are four main dialect divisions and these can be organized within two larger dialect collections:

- Iñupiaq
  - Seward Peninsula Iñupiaq is spoken on the Seward Peninsula. It has a possible Yupik substrate and is divergent from other Inuit languages.
    - Qawiaraq
    - Bering Strait
  - Northern Alaskan Iñupiaq is spoken from the Northwest Arctic and North Slope regions of Alaska to the Mackenzie Delta in Northwest Territories, Canada.
    - Malimiut
    - North Slope Iñupiaq

Dialect collection	Dialect	Subdialect	Tribal nation(s)	Populated areas
Seward Peninsula Iñupiaq	Bering Strait	Diomede	Iŋalit	Little Diomede Island, Big Diomede Island until the late 1940s
Seward Peninsula Iñupiaq	Bering Strait	Wales	Kiŋikmiut, Tapqaġmiut	Wales, Shishmaref, Brevig Mission
Seward Peninsula Iñupiaq	Bering Strait	King Island	Ugiuvaŋmiut	King Island until the early 1960s, Nome
Seward Peninsula Iñupiaq	Qawiaraq	Teller	Siñiġaġmiut, Qawiaraġmiut	Teller, Shaktoolik
Seward Peninsula Iñupiaq	Qawiaraq	Fish River	Iġałuiŋmiut	White Mountain, Golovin
Northern Alaskan Iñupiaq	Malimiutun	Kobuk	Kuuŋmiut, Kiitaaŋmiut [Kiitaaġmiut], Siilim Kaŋianiġmiut, Nuurviŋmiut, Kuuvaum Kaŋiaġmiut, Akuniġmiut, Nuataaġmiut, Napaaqtuġmiut, Kivalliñiġmiut	Kobuk River Valley, Selawik
Northern Alaskan Iñupiaq	Malimiutun	Coastal	Pittaġmiut, Kaŋiġmiut, Qikiqtaġruŋmiut	Kotzebue, Noatak
Northern Alaskan Iñupiaq	North Slope / Siḷaliñiġmiutun	Common North Slope	Utuqqaġmiut, Siliñaġmiut [Kuukpaaġruŋmiut and Kuuŋmiut], Kakligmiut [Sitarumiut, Utqiaġviŋmiut and Nuvuŋmiut], Kuulugruaġmiut, Ikpikpagmiut, Kuukpiŋmiut [Kañianermiut, Killinermiut and Kagmalirmiut]	Barrow, Coleville River (Nuiqsut, Umiat)
Northern Alaskan Iñupiaq	North Slope / Siḷaliñiġmiutun	Point Hope	Tikiġaġmiut	Point Hope
Northern Alaskan Iñupiaq	North Slope / Siḷaliñiġmiutun	Point Barrow	Nuvuŋmiut	
Northern Alaskan Iñupiaq	North Slope / Siḷaliñiġmiutun	Anaktuvuk Pass	Nunamiut	Anaktuvuk Pass
Northern Alaskan Iñupiaq	North Slope / Siḷaliñiġmiutun	Uummarmiutun (Uummaġmiutun)	Uummarmiut (Uummaġmiut)	Aklavik (Canada), Inuvik (Canada)

Extra geographical information:

Bering Strait dialect:

The Native population of the Big Diomede Island was moved to the Siberian mainland after World War II. The following generation of the population spoke Central Siberian Yupik or Russian. The entire population of King Island moved to Nome in the early 1960s. The Bering Strait dialect might also be spoken in Teller on the Seward Peninsula.

Qawiaraq dialect:

A dialect of Qawiaraq is spoken in Nome. A dialect of Qawariaq may also be spoken in Koyuk, Mary's Igloo, Council, and Elim. The Teller sub-dialect may be spoken in Unalakleet.

Malimiutun dialect:

Both sub-dialects can be found in Buckland, Koyuk, Shaktoolik, and Unalakleet. A dialect of Malimiutun may be spoken in Deering, Kiana, Noorvik, Shungnak, and Ambler. The Malimiutun sub-dialects have also been classified as "Southern Malimiut" (found in Koyuk, Shaktoolik, and Unalakleet) and "Northern Malimiut" found in "other villages".

North Slope dialect:

Common North Slope is "a mix of the various speech forms formerly used in the area". The Point Barrow dialect was "spoken only by a few elders" in 2010. A dialect of North Slope is also spoken in Kivalina, Point Lay, Wainwright, Atqasuk, Utqiaġvik, Nuiqsut, and Barter Island.

== Phonology ==
=== Vowels ===
All Iñupiaq dialects have three basic vowel qualities: /a i u/. There is currently no instrumental work to determine what allophones may be linked to these vowels. All three vowels can be long or short, giving rise to a system of six phonemic vowels /a aː i iː u uː/. Long vowels are represented by double letters in the orthography: ⟨aa⟩, ⟨ii⟩, ⟨uu⟩. The following diphthongs occur: /ai ia au ua iu ui/. No more than two vowels occur in a sequence in Iñupiaq.

The Bering strait (Seward Peninsula) dialect has a fourth vowel ⟨e⟩ /ə/, which preserves the fourth proto-Eskimo vowel reconstructed as */ə/.

==== Strong and weak ⟨i⟩ ====
In the dialects without ⟨e⟩, proto-Eskimo */e/ has merged with the closed front vowel /i/. The merged /i/ is referred to as the "strong /i/", which causes palatalization when preceding consonant clusters in the North Slope dialect (see section on palatalization below). The other /i/ is referred to as "the weak /i/". Weak and strong /i/s are not differentiated in orthography, making it impossible to tell which ⟨i⟩ represents palatalization "short of looking at other processes which depend on the distinction between two i's or else examining data from other Eskimo languages". However, it can be assumed that, within a word, if a palatal consonant is preceded by an ⟨i⟩, it is strong. If an alveolar consonant is preceded by an ⟨i⟩, it is weak.

According to MacLean (1986), the strong i can be paired with a vowel. The weak i on the other hand cannot. The weak i will become an a if it is paired with another vowel, or if the consonant before the i becomes geminate. This rule may or may not apply to other dialects. Therefore:

Type of ⟨i⟩	Example
weak	tumi → tumaa /tumi/ → /tumaː/ footprint → {her/his footprint}
strong	qimmiq → qimmia /qimːiq/ → /qimːia/ dog → {her/his dog}
weak	kamik → kammak /kamik/ → /kamːak/ boot → {two boots}

=== Consonants ===
Iñupiaq dialects differ widely between consonants used. However, consonant clusters of more than two consonants in a row do not occur. A word may not begin nor end with a consonant cluster.

Words may begin with a stop (with the exception of the palatal stop /c/), the fricative /s/, nasals /m n/, with a vowel, or the semivowel /j/. Loanwords, proper names, and exclamations may begin with any segment in both the Seward Peninsula dialects and the North Slope dialects. In the Uummarmiutun dialect words can also begin with /h/. For example, the word for "ear" in North Slope and Little Diomede Island dialects is siun whereas in Uummarmiutun it is hiun.

A word may end in any nasal sound (except for the /ɴ/ found in North Slope), in the stops /t k q/ or in a vowel. In the North Slope dialect if a word ends with an m, and the next word begins with a stop, the m is pronounced /p/, as in aġnam tupiŋa, pronounced /aʁnap tupiŋa/

==== North Slope Iñupiaq ====
The consonant inventory for North Slope Iñupiaq:

		Labial	Alveolar	Retroflex/ Palatal	Velar	Uvular	Glottal
Nasal		m	n	ɲ	ŋ	ɴ	
Stop		p	t	c	k	q	(ʔ) (Note: /ʔ/ may not be a phoneme.)
Fricative	voiceless	f	s	ʂ	x	χ	h
Fricative	voiced	v		ʐ (Note: Younger speakers and heritage learners of the language are replacing the sound /ʐ/ with the somewhat similar [ɹ], familiar to English speakers as a typical ⟨r⟩. It is also written in Iñupiaq as ⟨r⟩, to which Lanz (2010) argues that orthography influences pronunciation.)	ɣ	ʁ	
Fricative	lateral		ɬ	𝼆 (Note: The sound /𝼆/ might actually be /ɬʲ/.)			
Approximant	lateral		l	ʎ			
Approximant	median			j			

The voiceless stops /p t k/ and /q/ are not aspirated. This may or may not be true for other dialects as well.

MacLean (1986) argues that /c/ is derived from a palatalized and unreleased /t/. However, Lanz (2010) notes that there are words such as atchak [accak] in which /i/-palatalization could not have occurred, so that /c/ must be phonemic. Lanz (2010) also notes that /c/ is often pronounced as [tʃ], particularly by younger speakers and learners, and is thus a case of affrication rather than simply palatalization.

===== Assimilation =====
This section is supported by MacLean (1986).

Two consonants cannot appear together unless they share the manner of articulation (in this case treating the lateral and approximant consonants as fricatives). The only exception to this rule is having a voiced fricative consonant appear with a nasal consonant. Since all stops in North Slope are voiceless, a lot of needed assimilation arises from having to assimilate a voiceless stop to a voiced consonant.

This process is realized by assimilating the first consonant in the cluster to a consonant that: 1) has the same (or closest possible) area of articulation as the consonant being assimilated to; and 2) has the same manner of articulation as the second consonant that it is assimilating to. If the second consonant is a lateral or approximant, the first consonant will assimilate to a lateral or approximant if possible. If not the first consonant will assimilate to a fricative. Therefore:

IPA	Example
/kn/ → /ɣn/ or → /ŋn/	Kamik + niaq + te → {kamigniaqtuq or kamiŋniaqtuq} {"to put boots on"} + "will" + "he" → {he will put the boots on}
/qn/ → /ʁn/ or → /ɴ/ *	iḷisaq + niaq + tuq → iḷisaġniaqtuq {"to study"} + "will" + "he" → {he will study}
/tn/ → /nn/	aqpat + niaq + tuq → aqpanniaqtuq {"to run"} + "will" + "he" → {he will run}
/tm/ → /nm/	makit + man → makinman {"to stand up"} + {"when he"} → {When he stood up}
/tɬ/ → /ɬɬ/	makit + łuni → makiłłuni {"to stand"} + {"by ---ing"} → {standing up, he ...}

* The sound /ɴ/ is not represented in the orthography. Therefore the spelling ġn can be pronounced as /ʁn/ or /ɴn/. In both examples 1 and 2, since voiced fricatives can appear with nasal consonants, both consonant clusters are possible.

The stops /t̚ʲ/ and /t/ do not have a corresponding voiced fricative, therefore they will assimilate to the closest possible area of articulation. In this case, the /t̚ʲ/ will assimilate to the voiced approximant /j/. The /t/ will assimilate into a /ʐ/. Therefore:

IPA	Example
/t̚ʲɣ/ → /jɣ/	siksriit + guuq → siksriiyguuq "squirrels" + {"it is said that"} → {it is said that squirrels}
/tv/ → /ʐv/	aqpat + vik → aqparvik {"to run"} + "place" → {race track}

(In the first example above note that ⟨sr⟩ denotes a single consonant, as shown in the alphabet section below, so the constraint of at most two consonants in a cluster, as mentioned above, is not violated.)

In the case of the second consonant being a lateral, the lateral will again be treated as a fricative. Therefore:

IPA	Example
/ml/ → /ml/ or → /vl/	aġnam + lu → {aġnamlu or aġnavlu} {"(of) the woman"} + "and" → {and (of) the woman}
/nl/ → /nl/ or → /ll/	aŋun + lu → {aŋunlu or aŋullu} {"the man"} + "and" → {and the man}

Since voiced fricatives can appear with nasal consonants, both consonant clusters are possible.

The sounds /f/ /x/ and /χ/ are not represented in the orthography (unless they occur alone between vowels). Therefore, like the /ɴn/ example shown above, assimilation still occurs while the spelling remains the same. Therefore:

IPA (pronunciation)	Example
/qɬ/ → /χɬ/	miqłiqtuq child
/kʂ/ → /xʂ/	siksrik squirrel
/vs/ → /fs/	tavsi belt

These general features of assimilation are not shared with Uummarmiut, Malimiutun, or the Seward Peninsula dialects. Malimiutun and the Seward Peninsula dialects "preserve voiceless stops (k, p, q, t) when they are etymological (i.e. when they belong to the original word-base)". Compare:

North Slope	Malimiutun	Seward Peninsula dialects	Uummarmiut	English
nivliqsuq	nipliqsuq	nipłatuq, nipłiqtuq	nivliraqtuq	makes a sound
igniq	ikniq	ikniq	ikniq	fire
annuġaak	atnuġaak	atnuġaak	atar̂aaq	garment

===== Palatalization =====
This section is supported by MacLean (1986).

The following patterns of palatalization can occur in North Slope Iñupiaq: /t/ → /t̚ʲ/, /tʃ/ or /s/; /ɬ/ → /ʎ̥/; /l/ → /ʎ/; and /n/ → /ɲ/. Palatalization only occurs when one of these four alveolars is preceded by a strong i. Compare:

Type of I	Example
strong	qimmiq → qimmit /qimːiq/ → /qimːit̚ʲ/ dog → dogs
weak	tumi → tumit /tumi/ → /tumit/ footprint → footprints
strong	iġġi → iġġiḷu /iʁːi/ → /iʁːiʎu/ mountain → {and a mountain}
weak	tumi → tumilu /tumi/ → /tumilu/ footprint → {and a footprint}

The sound /t̚ʲ/ does not have its own letter, and is simply spelled with a ⟨t⟩. The IPA transcription of the above vowels may be incorrect.

If a ⟨t⟩ that precedes a vowel is palatalized, it will become an /s/. The strong i affects the entire consonant cluster, palatalizing all consonants that can be palatalized within the cluster. Therefore:

Type of I	Example
strong	qimmiq + tigun → qimmisigun /qimmiq/ + /tiɣun/ → /qimːisiɣun/ dog + {amongst the plural things} → {amongst, in the midst of dogs}
strong	puqik + tuq → puqiksuq /puqik/ + /tuq/ → /puqiksuq/ {to be smart} + {she/he/it} → {she/he/it is smart}

In the first example, due to the nature of the suffix, the /q/ is dropped. Like the first set of examples, the IPA transcriptions of above vowels may be incorrect.

If a strong i precedes geminate consonant, the entire elongated consonant becomes palatalized. For Example: niġḷḷaturuq and tikiññiaqtuq.

==== Uummarmiutun sub-dialect ====
For the Uummarmiutun sub-dialect:

		Labial	Alveolar	Retroflex/ Palatal	Velar	Uvular	Glottal
Nasal		m	n	ɲ	ŋ		
Stop/ Affricate	voiceless	p	t	tʃ	k	q	(ʔ) (Note: Ambiguities: This sound might exist in the Uummarmiutun sub dialect.)
Stop/ Affricate	voiced			dʒ			
Fricative	voiceless	f	ɬ		x	χ	h
Fricative	voiced	v		ʐ	ɣ	ʁ	
Approximant			l	j			

===== Phonological rules =====
The following are the phonological rules: /f/ is always found as a geminate.

/j/ cannot be geminated, and is always found between vowels or preceded by /v/. In rare cases it can be found at the beginning of a word.

/h/ is never geminate, and can appear as the first letter of the word, between vowels, or preceded by /k, q, ɬ/.

/tʃ/ and /dʒ/ are always geminate or preceded by a /t/.

/ʐ/ can appear between vowels, preceded by consonants /t, k, q, v, ɣ, ʁ/, or it can be followed by /v, ɣ, ʁ/.

==== Seward Peninsula Iñupiaq ====
The consonant inventory for Seward Peninsula Iñupiaq:

		Labial	Alveolar	Retroflex/ Palatal	Velar	Uvular	Glottal
Nasal		m	n		ŋ		
Stop/ Affricate	voiceless	p	t	tʃ	k	q	ʔ
Stop/ Affricate	voiced	b					
Fricative	voiceless		s	ʂ			h
Fricative	voiced	v	z	ʐ	ɣ	ʁ	
Fricative	liquid		ɬ				
Approximant	liquid		l	ɻ			
Approximant	semivowel	w		j			

=== Gemination ===
In North Slope Iñupiaq, all consonants represented by orthography can be geminated, except for the sounds /tʃ, s, ʂ, h/. Seward Peninsula Iñupiaq (using vocabulary from the Little Diomede Island as a representative sample) likewise can have all consonants represented by orthography appear as geminates, except for /ŋ, b, ʂ, h, z, ʐ, w/. Gemination is caused by suffixes being added to a consonant, so that the consonant is found between two vowels.

=== Prosody ===
Very little information of the prosody of Iñupiaq has been collected. However, "fundamental frequency (Hz), intensity (dB), loudness (sones), and spectral tilt (phons - dB) may be important" in Malimiutun. Likewise, "duration is not likely to be important in Malimiut Iñupiaq stress/syllable prominence".

== Writing systems ==
Iñupiaq was first written when explorers first arrived in Alaska and began recording words in the native languages. They wrote by adapting the letters of their own language to writing the sounds they were recording. Spelling was often inconsistent, since the writers invented it as they wrote. Unfamiliar sounds were often confused with other sounds, so that, for example, 'q' was often not distinguished from 'k' and long consonants or vowels were not distinguished from short ones.

Along with the Alaskan and Siberian Yupik, the Iñupiat eventually adopted the Latin script that Moravian missionaries developed in Greenland and Labrador. Native Alaskans also developed a system of pictographs, which, however, died with its creators.

In 1946, Roy Ahmaogak, an Iñupiaq Presbyterian minister from Utqiaġvik, worked with Eugene Nida, a member of the Summer Institute of Linguistics, to develop the current Iñupiaq alphabet based on the Latin script. Although some changes have been made since its origin—most notably the change from 'ḳ' to 'q'—the essential system was accurate and is still in use.

Iñupiaq alphabet (North Slope and Northwest Arctic)
A a	Ch ch	G g	Ġ ġ	H h	I i	K k	L l	Ḷ ḷ	Ł ł	Ł̣ ł̣	M m
a	cha	ga	ġa	ha	i	ka	la	ḷa	ła	ł̣a	ma
/a/	/tʃ/	/ɣ/	/ʁ/	/h/	/i/	/k/	/l/	/ʎ/	/ɬ/	/𝼆/	/m/
N n	Ñ ñ	Ŋ ŋ	P p	Q q	R r	S s	Sr sr	T t	U u	V v	Y y
na	ña	ŋa	pa	qa	ra	sa	sra	ta	u	va	ya
/n/	/ɲ/	/ŋ/	/p/	/q/	/ɹ/	/s/	/ʂ/	/t/	/u/	/v/	/j/

Extra letter for Kobuk dialect: ʼ /ʔ/

Iñupiaq alphabet (Seward Peninsula)
A a	B b	G g	Ġ ġ	H h	I i	K k	L l	Ł ł	M m	N n	Ŋ ŋ	P p
a	ba	ga	ġa	ha	i	ka	la	ła	ma	na	ŋa	pa
/a/	/b/	/ɣ/	/ʁ/	/h/	/i/	/k/	/l/	/ɬ/	/m/	/n/	/ŋ/	/p/
Q q	R r	S s	Sr sr	T t	U u	V v	W w	Y y	Z z	Zr zr	ʼ	
qa	ra	sa	sra	ta	u	va	wa	ya	za	zra		
/q/	/ɹ/	/s/	/ʂ/	/t/	/u/	/v/	/w/	/j/	/z/	/ʐ/	/ʔ/	

Extra letters for specific dialects:

- Diomede: e /ə/
- Qawiaraq: ch /tʃ/

Canadian Iñupiaq alphabet (Uummarmiutun)
A a	Ch ch	F f	G g	H h	Dj dj	I i	K k	L l	Ł ł	M m
a	cha	fa	ga	ha	dja	i	ka	la	ła	ma
/a/	/tʃ/	/f/	/ɣ/	/h/	/dʒ/	/i/	/k/	/l/	/ɬ/	/m/
N n	Ñ ñ	Ng ng	P p	Q q	R r	R̂ r̂	T t	U u	V v	Y y
na	ña	ŋa	pa	qa	ra	r̂a	ta	u	va	ya
/n/	/ɲ/	/ŋ/	/p/	/q/	/ʁ/	/ʐ/	/t/	/u/	/v/	/j/

== Morphosyntax ==
Due to the number of dialects and complexity of Iñupiaq morphosyntax, the following section discusses Malimiutun morphosyntax as a representative. Any examples from other dialects will be marked as such.

Iñupiaq is a polysynthetic language, meaning that words can be extremely long, consisting of one of three stems (verb stem, noun stem, and demonstrative stem) along with one or more of three endings (postbases, (grammatical) endings, and enclitics). The stem gives meaning to the word, whereas endings give information regarding case, mood, tense, person, plurality, etc. The stem can appear as simple (having no postbases) or complex (having one or more postbases). In Iñupiaq a "postbase serves somewhat the same functions that adverbs, adjectives, prefixes, and suffixes do in English" along with marking various types of tenses. There are six word classes in Malimiut Inñupiaq: nouns (see Nominal Morphology), verbs (see Verbal Morphology), adverbs, pronouns, conjunctions, and interjections. All demonstratives are classified as either adverbs or pronouns.

=== Nominal morphology ===
The Iñupiaq category of number distinguishes singular, dual, and plural. The language works on an Ergative–Absolutive system, where nouns are inflected for number, several cases, and possession. Iñupiaq (Malimiutun) has nine cases, two core cases (ergative and absolutive) and seven oblique cases (instrumental, allative, ablative, locative, perlative, similative and vocative). North Slope Iñupiaq does not have the vocative case. Iñupiaq does not have a category of gender and articles.

Iñupiaq nouns can likewise be classified by Wolf A. Seiler's seven noun classes. These noun classes are "based on morphological behavior. [They] ... have no semantic basis but are useful for case formation ... stems of various classes interact with suffixes differently".

Due to the nature of the morphology, a single case can take on up to 12 endings (ignoring the fact that realization of these endings can change depending on noun class). For example, the possessed ergative ending for a class 1a noun can take on the endings: -ma, ‑mnuk, ‑pta, ‑vich, ‑ptik, -psi, -mi, -mik, -miŋ, -ŋan, -ŋaknik, and ‑ŋata. Therefore, only general features will be described below. For an extensive list on case endings, please see Seiler 2012, Appendix 4, 6, and 7.

==== Absolutive case/noun stems ====
The subject of an intransitive sentence or the object of a transitive sentence take on the absolutive case. This case is likewise used to mark the basic form of a noun. Therefore, all the singular, dual, and plural absolutive forms serve as stems for the other oblique cases. The following chart is verified of both Malimiutun and North Slope Iñupiaq.

Absolutive endings
	Endings
singular	-q, -k, -n, or any vowel
dual	-k
plural	-t

If the singular absolutive form ends with -n, it has the underlying form of -ti /tə/. This form will show in the absolutive dual and plural forms. Therefore:

tiŋmisuun → tiŋmisuutik & tiŋmisuutit
airplane {} {two airplanes} {} {multiple airplanes}

Regarding nouns that have an underlying /ə/ (weak i), the i will change to an a and the previous consonant will be geminated in the dual form. Therefore:

Kamik → kammak
boot {} {two boots}

If the singular form of the noun ends with -k, the preceding vowel will be elongated. Therefore:

savik → saviik
knife {} {two knives}

On occasion, the consonant preceding the final vowel is also geminated, though exact phonological reasoning is unclear.

==== Ergative case ====
The ergative case is often referred to as the Relative Case in Iñupiaq sources. This case marks the subject of a transitive sentence or a genitive (possessive) noun phrase. For non-possessed noun phrases, the noun is marked only if it is a third person singular. The unmarked nouns leave ambiguity as to who/what is the subject and object. This can be resolved only through context. Possessed noun phrases and noun phrases expressing genitive are marked in ergative for all persons.

Ergative endings
Endings	Allophones
-m	-um, -im

This suffix applies to all singular unpossessed nouns in the ergative case.

Examples
Example	English
aŋun → aŋutim	man → man (ergative)
aŋatchiaq → aŋatchiaŋma	uncle → my two uncles (ergative)

Please note the underlying /tə/ form in the first example.

==== Instrumental case ====
This case is also referred to as the modalis case. This case has a wide range of uses described below:

Usage of instrumental	Example
Marks nouns that are means by which the subject achieves something (see instrumental)	Aŋuniaqtim aġviġluaq tuqutkaa nauligamik. hunter.ERG {gray whale-ABS} kill-IND-3SG.SBJ-3SG.OBJ harpoon-INS; The hunter killed the gray whale with a harpoon.
Marks the apparent patient (grammatical object upon which the action was carried out) of syntactically intransitive verbs	Miñułiqtugut umiamik. paint-IND-3SG.OBJ boat-INS; We're painting a boat.
Marks information new to the narrative (when the noun is first mentioned in a narrative) Marks indefinite objects of some transitive verbs	Tuyuġaat tuyuutimik. send-IND-3PL.SBJ-3SG.OBJ letter-INS; They sent him a letter.
Marks the specification of a noun's meaning to incorporate the meaning of another noun (without incorporating both nouns into a single word) (Modalis of specification)	Niġiqaqtuguk tuttumik. food—have-IND-1DU.SBJ caribou-INS; We (dual) have (food) caribou for food.
Marks the specification of a noun's meaning to incorporate the meaning of another noun (without incorporating both nouns into a single word) (Modalis of specification)	Qavsiñik paniqaqpit? {how many}-INS daughter—have How many daughters do you have?

Instrumental endings
	Endings	Examples
singular	-mik	Kamik → kamiŋmik boot → {(with a) boot}
dual	[dual absolutive stem] -nik	kammak → kammaŋnik {(two) boots} → {(with two) boots}
plural	[singular absolutive stem] -nik	kamik → kamiŋnik boot → {(with multiple) boots}

Since the ending is the same for both dual and plural, different stems are used. In all the examples the k is assimilated to an ŋ.

==== Allative case ====
The allative case is also referred to as the terminalis case. The uses of this case are described below:

Usage of Allative	Example
Used to signify motion or an action directed towards a goal	Qaliŋaum quppiġaaq atauksritchaa Nauyamun. Qaliŋak-ERG coat-ABS lend-IND-3SG.SBJ-3SG.OBJ Nauyaq-ALL; Qaliŋak lent a coat to Nauyaq
Used to signify motion or an action directed towards a goal	Isiqtuq iglumun. enter-IND-3SG house-ALL; He went into the house
Signifies that the statement is for the purpose of the marked noun	Niġiqpaŋmun niqiłiuġñiaqtugut. feast-ALL prepare.a.meal-FUT-IND-3PL.SBJ; We will prepare a meal for the feast.
Signifies the beneficiary of the statement	Piquum uligruat paipiuranun qiḷaŋniqsuq. Piquk-ERG blanket-ABS-PL baby-PL-ALL knit-IND-3SG; Evidently Piquk knits blankets for babies.
Marks the noun that is being addressed to	Qaliŋaŋmun uqautirut Qaliŋaŋmun-ALL tell-IND-3PL.SBJ; They (plural) told Qaliŋak.

Allative endings
	Endings	Examples
singular	-mun	aġnauraq → aġnauramun girl → {(to the) girl}
dual	[dual absolutive stem] -nun	aġnaurak → aġnauraŋ* {(two) girls} → {(with two) girls}
plural	[singular absolutive stem] -nun	aġnauraq → aġnauranun girl → {(to the two) girls}

*It is unclear as to whether this example is regular for the dual form or not.

=== Numerals ===
Iñupiaq numerals are base-20 with a sub-base of 5. The numbers 1 to 20 are:

1	2	3	4	5
atausiq	malġuk	piŋasut	sisamat	tallimat
6	7	8	9	10
itchaksrat	tallimat malġuk	tallimat piŋasut	quliŋŋuġutaiḷaq	qulit
11	12	13	14	15
qulit atausiq	qulit malġuk	qulit piŋasut	akimiaġutaiḷaq	akimiaq
16	17	18	19	20
akimiaq atausiq	akimiaq malġuk	akimiaq piŋasut	iñuiññaġutaiḷaq	iñuiññaq

The sub-base of five shows in the words for 5, tallimat, and 15, akimiaq, to which the numbers 1 to 3 are added to create the words for 7, 8, 16, 17 and 18, etc. (itchaksrat '6' being irregular). Apart from sisamat '4', numbers before a multiple of five are indicated with the subtractive element -utaiḷaq: quliŋŋuġutaiḷaq '9' from qulit '10', akimiaġutaiḷaq '14' from akimiaq '15', iñuiññaġutaiḷaq '19' from iñuiññaq '20'.

Scores are created with the element -kipiaq, and numbers between the scores are composed by adding 1 through 19 to these. Multiples of 400 are created with -agliaq and 8000's with -pak. Note that these words will vary between singular -q and plural -t, depending on the speaker and whether they are being used for counting or for modifying a noun.

#	Number	Semantics
20	iñuiññaq	20
25	iñuiññaq tallimat	20 + 5
29	iñuiññaq quliŋŋuġutaiḷaq	20 + 10 − 1
30	iñuiññaq qulit	20 + 10
35	iñuiññaq akimiaq	20 + 15
39	malġukipiaġutaiḷaq	2×20 − 1
40	malġukipiaq	2×20
45	malġukipiaq tallimat	2×20 + 5
50	malġukipiaq qulit	2×20 + 10
55	malġukipiaq akimiaq	2×20 + 15
60	piŋasukipiaq	3×20
70	piŋasukipiaq qulit	3×20 + 10
80	sisamakipiaq	4×20
90	sisamakipiaq qulit	4×20 + 10
99	tallimakipiaġutaiḷaq	5×20 − 1
100	tallimakipiaq	5×20
110	tallimakipiaq qulit	5×20 + 10
120	tallimakipiaq iñuiññaq	5×20 + 20
140	tallimakipiaq malġukipiaq	5×20 + 2×20
160	tallimakipiaq piŋasukipiaq	5×20 + 3×20
180	tallimakipiaq sisamakipiaq	5×20 + 4×20
200	qulikipiaq	10×20
300	akimiakipiaq	15×20
400	iñuiññakipiaq (in reindeer herding and math, iḷagiññaq)	20×20
800	malġuagliaq	2×400
1200	piŋasuagliaq	3×400
1600	sisamaagliaq	4×400
2000	tallimaagliaq	5×400
2400	tallimaagliaq iḷagiññaq	5×400 + 400
2800	tallimaagliaq malġuagliaq	5×400 + 2×400
4000	quliagliaq	10×400
6000	akimiagliaq	15×400
7999	atausiqpautaiḷaq	8000 − 1
8000	atausiqpak	8000
16,000	malġuqpak	2×8000
24,000	piŋasuqpak	3×8000
32,000	sisamaqpak	4×8000
40,000	tallimaqpak	5×8000
48,000	tallimaqpak atausiqpak	5×8000 + 8000
72,000	tallimaqpak sisamaqpak	5×8000 + 4×8000
80,000	quliqpak	10×8000
120,000	akimiaqpak	15×8000
160,000	iñuiññaqpak	20×8000
320,000	malġukipiaqpak	2×20×8000
480,000	piŋasukipiaqpak	3×20×8000
640,000	sisamakipiaqpak	4×20×8000
800,000	tallimakipiaqpak	5×20×8000
1,600,000	qulikipiaqpak	10×20×8000
2,400,000	akimiakipiaqpak	15×20×8000
3,200,000	iḷagiññaqpak	400×8000
6,400,000	malġuagliaqpak	2×400×8000
9,600,000	piŋasuagliaqpak	3×400×8000
12,800,000	sisamaagliaqpak	4×400×8000
16 million	tallimaagliaqpak	5x400×8000
32 million	quliagliaqpak	10×400×8000
48 million	akimiagliaqpak	15×400×8000

The system continues through compounding suffixes to a maximum of iñuiññagliaqpakpiŋatchaq (20×400×8000^{3}, ≈ 4 quadrillion), e.g.

#	Number	Semantics
64 million	atausiqpakaippaq	1×8000^{2}
1,280 million	iñuiññaqpakaippaq	20×8000^{2}
25.6 billion	iḷagiññaqpakaippaq	400×8000^{2}
511,999,999,999	atausiqpakpiŋatchaġutaiḷaq	1×8000^{3} − 1
512 billion	atausiqpakpiŋatchaq	1×8000^{3}
10.24 trillion	iñuiññaqpakpiŋatchaq	20×8000^{3}
204.8 trillion	iḷagiññaqpakpiŋatchaq	400×8000^{3}
2.048 quadrillion	quliagliaqpakpiŋatchaq	10×400×8000^{3}

There is also a decimal system for the hundreds and thousands, with the numerals qavluun for 100 and kavluutit for 1000, thus malġuk qavluun 200, malġuk kavluutit 2000, etc.

==== Etymology ====
The numeral five, tallimat, is derived from the word for hand/arm. The word for 10, qulit, is derived from the word for "top", meaning the ten digits on the top part of the body. The numeral for 15, akimiaq, means something like "it goes across", and the numeral for 20, iñuiññaq means something like "entire person" or "complete person", indicating the 20 digits of all extremities.

=== Verbal morphology ===
Again, Malimiutun Iñupiaq is used as a representative example in this section. The basic structure of the verb is [(verb) + (derivational suffix) + (inflectional suffix) + (enclitic)], although Lanz (2010) argues that this approach is insufficient since it "forces one to analyze ... optional ... suffixes". Every verb has an obligatory inflection for person, number, and mood (all marked by a single suffix), and can have other inflectional suffixes such as tense, aspect, modality, and various suffixes carrying adverbial functions.

==== Tense ====
Tense marking is always optional. The only explicitly marked tense is the future tense. Past and present tense cannot be marked and are always implied. All verbs can be marked through adverbs to show relative time (using words such as "yesterday" or "tomorrow"). If neither of these markings is present, the verb can imply a past, present, or future tense.

Future tense
Tense	Example
Present	Uqaqsiitigun uqaqtuguk. telephone we-DU-talk; We (two) talk on the phone.
Future	Uqaqsiitigun uqaġisiruguk. telephone we-DU-FUT-talk; We (two) will talk on the phone.
Future (implied)	Iġñivaluktuq aakauraġa uvlaakun. {give birth probably} {my sister} tomorrow My sister (will) give(s) birth tomorrow. (the future tense "will" is implied by the word tomorrow)

==== Aspect ====
Marking aspect is optional in Iñupiaq verbs. Both North Slope and Malimiut Iñupiaq have a perfective versus imperfective distinction in aspect, along with other distinctions such as: frequentative (-ataq; "to repeatedly verb"), habitual (-suu; "to always, habitually verb"), inchoative (-łhiñaaq; "about to verb"), and intentional (-saġuma; "intend to verb"). The aspect suffix can be found after the verb root and before or within the obligatory person-number-mood suffix.

==== Mood ====
Iñupiaq has the following moods: Indicative, Interrogative, Imperative (positive, negative), Coordinative, and Conditional. Participles are sometimes classified as a mood.

Mood	Usage	Example	Notes
Indicative	Declarative statements	aŋuniaqtit siñiktut. hunt-NZ-PL sleep-3-IND; The hunters are sleeping.	
Participles	Creating relative clauses	Putu aŋutauruq umiaqaqtuaq. Putu young-man boat-have-3-PTCP; Putu is a man who owns a boat.	"who owns a boat" is one word, where the meaning of the English "who" is implied through the case.
Interrogative	Formation of yes/no questions and content questions	Puuvratlavich. swim-POT-2-INTERR; Can you (singular) swim?	Yes/no question
Interrogative	Formation of yes/no questions and content questions	Suvisik? what-2DU-INTERR; What are you two doing?	Content question (this is a single word)
Imperative	A command	Naalaġiñ! listen-2SG-IMP; Listen!	
Conditionals	Conditional and hypothetical statements	Kakkama niġiŋaruŋa. hungry-1SG-COND-PFV eat-PFV-1SG-IND; When I got hungry, I ate.	Conditional statement. The verb "eat" is in the indicative mood because it is simply a declarative statement.
Conditionals	Conditional and hypothetical statements	Kaakkumi niġiñiaqtuŋa. hungry-1SG-COND-IPFV eat-FUT-1SG-IND; If I get hungry, I will eat.	Hypothetical statement. The verb "eat" is in the indicative mood because it is simply a statement.
Coordinative	Formation of dependent clauses that function as modifiers of independent clauses	Agliqiłuŋa niġiruŋa. read-1SG-COORD eat-1SG-IND [While] reading, I eat.	The coordinative case on the verb "read" signifies that the verb is happening at the same time as the main clause ("eat" - marked by indicative because it is simply a declarative statement).

Indicative mood endings can be transitive or intransitive, as seen in the table below.

Indicative intransitive endings				Indicative transitive endings											
				OBJECT											
				Mood marker	3s	3d	3p	2s	2d	2p	1s	1d	1p		
+t/ru	ŋa guk gut	1S 1D 1P	S U B J E C T	+kI/gI	ga kpuk kput	kka ← ←	tka vuk vut	kpiñ ↓ visigiñ	vsik ↓ ↓	vsI ↓ ↓				1S 1D 1P	S U B J E C T
+t/ru	tin sik sI	2S 2D 2P	S U B J E C T	+kI/gI	n ksik ksi	kkiñ ← ←	tin sik si				ŋma vsiŋŋa vsiñŋa	vsiguk ↓ ↓	vsigut ↓ ↓	2S 2D 2P	S U B J E C T
+t/ru	q k t	3S SD 3P	S U B J E C T	+ka/ga	a ak at	ik ↓← ↓←	I ↓ It	atin ↓ ↓	asik ↓ ↓	asI ↓ ↓	aŋa aŋŋa aŋŋa	atiguk ↓ ↓	atigut ↓ ↓	3S 3D 3P	S U B J E C T

=== Syntax ===
Nearly all syntactic operations in the Malimiut dialect of Iñiupiaq—and Inuit languages and dialects in general—are carried out via morphological means.

The language aligns to an ergative-absolutive case system, which is mainly shown through nominal case markings and verb agreement (see above).

The basic word order is subject-object-verb. However, word order is flexible and both subject and/or object can be omitted. There is a tendency for the subject of a transitive verb (marked by the ergative case) to precede the object of the clause (marked by the absolutive case). There is likewise a tendency for the subject of an intransitive verb (marked by the absolutive case) to precede the verb. The subject of an intransitive verb and the object of a clause (both marked by the absolutive case) are usually found right before the verb. However, "this is [all] merely a tendency."

Iñupiaq grammar also includes morphological passive, antipassive, causative and applicative.

==== Noun incorporation ====
Noun incorporation is a common phenomenon in Malimiutun Iñupiaq. The first type of noun incorporation is lexical compounding. Within this subset of noun incorporation, the noun, which represents an instrument, location, or patient in relation to the verb, is attached to the front of the verb stem, creating a new intransitive verb. The second type is manipulation of case. It is argued whether this form of noun incorporation is present as noun incorporation in Iñupiaq, or "semantically transitive noun incorporation"—since with this kind of noun incorporation the verb remains transitive. The noun phrase subjects are incorporated not syntactically into the verb but rather as objects marked by the instrumental case. The third type of incorporation, manipulation of discourse structure, is supported by Mithun (1984) and argued against by Lanz (2010). See Lanz's paper for further discussion. The final type of incorporation is classificatory noun incorporation, whereby a "general [noun] is incorporated into the [verb], while a more specific [noun] narrows the scope". With this type of incorporation, the external noun can take on external modifiers and, like the other incorporations, the verb becomes intransitive. See Nominal Morphology (Instrumental Case, Usage of Instrumental table, row four) on this page for an example.

==== Switch-references ====
Switch-references occur in dependent clauses only with third person subjects. The verb must be marked as reflexive if the third person subject of the dependent clause matches the subject of the main clause (more specifically matrix clause). Compare:

Switch references
Example	Notes
Kaakkama niġiŋaruq. hungry-3-REFL-COND eat-3-IND; When he/she got hungry, he/she ate.	The verb in the matrix clause (to eat) refers to the same person because the verb in the dependent clause (To get hungry) is reflexive. Therefore, a single person got hungry and ate.
Kaaŋman niġiŋaruq. hungry-3-NREFL-COND eat-3-IND; When he/she got hungry, (someone else) ate.	The verb in the matrix clause (to eat) refers to a different singular person because the verb in the dependent clause (To get hungry) is non-reflexive.

== Text sample ==
This is a sample of the Iñupiaq language of the Kivalina variety from Kivalina Reader, published in 1975.

Aaŋŋaayiña aniñiqsuq Qikiqtami. Aasii iñuguġuni. Tikiġaġmi Kivaliñiġmiḷu. Tuvaaqatiniguni Aivayuamik. Qulit atautchimik qitunġivḷutik. Itchaksrat iñuuvlutiŋ. Iḷaŋat Qitunġaisa taamna Qiñuġana.

This is the English translation, from the same source:

Aaŋŋaayiña was born in Shishmaref. He grew up in Point Hope and Kivalina. He marries Aivayuaq. They had eleven children. Six of them are alive. One of the children is Qiñuġana.

== Vocabulary comparison ==
The comparison of various vocabulary in four different dialects:

North Slope Iñupiaq	Northwest Alaska Iñupiaq (Kobuk Malimiut)	King Island Iñupiaq	Qawiaraq Fish River dialect	English
atausiq	atausriq	atausiq	atauchiq	1
malġuk	malġuk	maġluuk	malġuk	2
piŋasut	piñasrut	piŋasut	piŋachut	3
sisamat	sisamat	sitamat	chitamat	4
tallimat	tallimat	tallimat	tallimat	5
itchaksrat	itchaksrat	aġvinikłit	aġvinilġit	6
tallimat malġuk	tallimat malġuk	tallimat maġluuk	malġunilġit	7
tallimat piŋasut	tallimat piñasrut	tallimat piŋasut	piŋachuŋilġit	8
quliŋuġutaiḷaq	quliŋŋuutaiḷaq	qulinŋutailat	quliŋŋuġutailat	9
qulit	qulit	qulit	qulit	10
qulit atausiq	qulit atausriq	qulit atausiq	qulit atauchiq	11
akimiaġutaiḷaq	akimiaŋŋutaiḷaq	agimiaġutailaq	akimiaġutailaq	14
akimiaq	akimiaq	agimiaq	akimiaq	15
iñuiññaŋŋutaiḷaq	iñuiñaġutaiḷaq	inuinaġutailat	inuinaġutailat	19
iñuiññaq	iñuiñaq	inuinaq	inuinaq	20
iñuiññaq qulit	iñuiñaq qulit	inuinaq qulit	inuinaq qulit	30
malġukipiaq	malġukipiaq	maġluutiviaq	—	40
tallimakipiaq	tallimakipiaq	tallimativiaq	—	100
kavluutit, malġuagliaq qulikipiaq	kavluutit	kabluutit	—	1000
nanuq	nanuq	taġukaq	nanuq	polar bear
ilisaurri	ilisautri	iskuuqti	ilichausriri	teacher
miŋuaqtuġvik	aglagvik	iskuuġvik	naaqiwik	school
aġnaq	aġnaq	aġnaq	aġnaq	woman
aŋun	aŋun	aŋun	aŋun	man
aġnaiyaaq	aġnauraq	niaqsaaġruk	niaqchiaġruk	girl
aŋutaiyaaq	aŋugauraq	ilagaaġruk	ilagaaġruk	boy
Tanik	Naluaġmiu	Naluaġmiu	Naluaġmiu	white person
ui	ui	ui	ui	husband
nuliaq	nuliaq	nuliaq	nuliaq	wife
panik	panik	panik	panik	daughter
iġñiq	iġñiq	qituġnaq	—	son
iglu	tupiq	ini	ini	house
tupiq	palapkaaq	palatkaaq, tuviq	tupiq	tent
qimmiq	qipmiq	qimugin	qimukti	dog
qavvik	qapvik	qappik	qaffik	wolverine
tuttu	tuttu	tuttu	tuttupiaq	caribou
tuttuvak	tiniikaq	tuttuvak, muusaq	—	moose
tulugaq	tulugaq	tiŋmiaġruaq	anaqtuyuuq	raven
ukpik	ukpik	ukpik	ukpik	snowy owl
tatqiq	tatqiq	taqqiq	taqqiq	moon/month
uvluġiaq	uvluġiaq	ubluġiaq	ubluġiaq	star
siqiñiq	siqiñiq	mazaq	machaq	sun
niġġivik	tiivlu, niġġivik	tiivuq, niġġuik	niġġiwik	table
uqautitaun	uqaqsiun	qaniqsuun	qaniqchuun	telephone
mitchaaġvik	mirvik	mizrvik	mirvik	airport
tiŋŋun	tiŋmisuun	silakuaqsuun	chilakuaqchuun	airplane
qai-	mauŋaq-	qai-	qai-	to come
pisuaq-	pisruk-	aġui-	aġui-	to walk
savak-	savak-	sawit-	chuli-	to work
nakuu-	nakuu-	naguu-	nakuu-	to be good
maŋaqtaaq	taaqtaaq	taaqtaaq	maŋaqtaaq, taaqtaaq	black
uvaŋa	uvaŋa	uaŋa	uaŋa, waaŋa	I, me
ilviñ	ilvich	iblin	ilvit	you (singular)
kiña	kiña	kina	kina	who
sumi	nani, sumi	nani	chumi	where
qanuq	qanuq	qanuġuuq	—	how
qakugu	qakugu	qagun	—	when (future)
ii	ii	ii'ii	ii, ii'ii	yes
naumi	naagga	naumi	naumi	no
paniqtaq	paniqtaq	paniqtuq	pipchiraq	dried fish or meat
saiyu	saigu	saayuq	chaiyu	tea
kuuppiaq	kuukpiaq	kuupiaq	kuupiaq	coffee

== See also ==
- Inuit languages
- Inuit-Yupik-Unangan languages
- Edna Ahgeak MacLean, a well-known Iñupiaq linguist
- Iñupiat people

== Print resources ==
- Barnum, Francis. Grammatical Fundamentals of the Innuit Language As Spoken by the Eskimo of the Western Coast of Alaska. Hildesheim: G. Olms, 1970.
- Blatchford, DJ. Just Like That!: Legends and Such, English to Iñupiaq Alphabet. Kasilof, AK: Just Like That!, 2003. ISBN 0-9723303-1-3
- Bodfish, Emma, and David Baumgartner. Iñupiat Grammar. Utqiaġvigmi: Utqiaġvium minuaqtuġviata Iñupiatun savagvianni, 1979.
- Kaplan, Lawrence D. Phonological Issues in North Alaskan Iñupiaq. Alaska Native Language Center research papers, no. 6. Fairbanks, Alaska (Alaska Native Language Center, University of Alaska, Fairbanks 99701): Alaska Native Language Center, 1981.
- Kaplan, Lawrence. Iñupiaq Phrases and Conversations. Fairbanks, AK: Alaska Native Language Center, University of Alaska, 2000. ISBN 1-55500-073-8
- MacLean, Edna Ahgeak. Iñupiallu Tanņiḷḷu Uqaluņisa Iḷaņich = Abridged Iñupiaq and English Dictionary. Fairbanks, Alaska: Alaska Native Language Center, University of Alaska, 1980.
- Lanz, Linda A. A Grammar of Iñupiaq Morphosyntax. Houston, Texas: Rice University, 2010.
- MacLean, Edna Ahgeak. Beginning North Slope Iñupiaq Grammar. Fairbanks, Alaska: Alaska Native Language Center, University of Alaska, 1979.
- Seiler, Wolf A. Iñupiatun Eskimo Dictionary. Kotzebue, Alaska: NANA Regional Corporation, 2005.
- Seiler, Wolf. The Modalis Case in Iñupiat: (Eskimo of North West Alaska). Giessener Beiträge zur Sprachwissenschaft, Bd. 14. Grossen-Linden: Hoffmann, 1978. ISBN 3-88098-019-5
- Webster, Donald Humphry, and Wilfried Zibell. Iñupiat Eskimo Dictionary. 1970.

== External links and language resources ==
There are a number of online resources that can provide a sense of the language and information for second language learners.

- Atchagat Pronunciation Video by Aqukkasuk
- Alaskool Iñupiaq Language Resources
- Animal Names in Brevig Mission Dialect
- Atchagat App by Grant and Reid Magdanz—Allows texting using Iñupiaq characters. (For all Alaska Native languages, including Iñupiaq, see updated Chert app by the same developers.)
- Dictionary of Iñupiaq, 1970 University of Fairbanks PDF by Webster
- Endangered Alaskan Language Goes Digital from National Public Radio
- Iñupiaq Handbook for Teachers (A story of the Iñupiaq language and further resources)
- University of Alaska Fairbanks Iñupiat Language Community Site
- North Slope Grammar Second Year by Dr. Edna MacLean PDF
- Online Iñupiaq morphological analyser
- Storybook—The Teller Reader, A Collection of Stories in the Brevig Mission Dialect
- Storybook—Quliaqtuat Mumiaksrat by Alaska Native Language Program, UAF and Dr. Edna MacLean
- The dialects of Iñupiaq- From Languagegeek.com, includes Northern Alaskan Consonants (US alphabet), Northern Alaskan Vowels, Seward Peninsula Consonants, Seward Peninsula Vowels
- InupiaqWords YouTube account
- Linda A. Lanz's Grammar of Iñupiaq (Malimiutun) Morphosyntax — The majority of grammar introduced on this Wikipedia page is cited from this grammar. Lanz's explanations are very detailed and thorough—a great source for gaining a more in-depth understanding of Iñupiaq grammar.

Indigenous languages of the Americas with Wikipedia
Item	Label/en	native label	Code	distribution map	number of speakers, writers, or signers	UNESCO language status	Ethnologue language status	?itemwiki
Q36806	Southern Quechua	qu:Urin Qichwa qu:Qhichwa qu:Qichwa	qu		6000000	2 vulnerable		Quechua Wikipedia
Q35876	Guarani	gn:Avañe'ẽ	gn		4850000	1 safe	1 National	Guarani Wikipedia
Q4627	Aymara	ay:Aymar aru	ay		4000000	2 vulnerable		Aymara Wikipedia
Q13300	Nahuatl	nah:Nawatlahtolli nah:nawatl nah:mexkatl	nah		1925620	2 vulnerable		Nahuatl Wikipedia
Q891085	Wayuu	guc:Wayuunaiki	guc		300000	2 vulnerable	5 Developing	Wayuu Wikipedia
Q33730	Mapudungun	arn:Mapudungun	arn		300000	3 definitely endangered	6b Threatened	Mapuche Wikipedia
Q13310	Navajo	nv:Diné bizaad nv:Diné	nv		169369	2 vulnerable	6b Threatened	Navajo Wikipedia
Q25355	Greenlandic	kl:Kalaallisut	kl		56200	2 vulnerable	1 National	Greenlandic Wikipedia
Q29921	Inuktitut	ike-cans:ᐃᓄᒃᑎᑐᑦ iu:Inuktitut	iu		39770	2 vulnerable		Inuktitut Wikipedia
Q33388	Cherokee	chr:ᏣᎳᎩ ᎧᏬᏂᎯᏍᏗ chr:ᏣᎳᎩ	chr		12300	4 severely endangered	8a Moribund	Cherokee Wikipedia
Q33390	Cree	cr:ᐃᔨᔨᐤ ᐊᔨᒧᐎᓐ' cr:nēhiyawēwin	cr		10875; 8040			Cree Wikipedia
Q32979	Choctaw	cho:Chahta anumpa cho:Chahta	cho		9200	2 vulnerable	6b Threatened	Choctaw Wikipedia
Q56590	Atikamekw	atj:Atikamekw Nehiromowin atj:Atikamekw	atj		6160	2 vulnerable	5 Developing	Atikamekw Wikipedia
Q27183	Iñupiaq	ik:Iñupiatun	ik		5580	4 severely endangered		Inupiat Wikipedia
Q523014	Muscogee	mus:Mvskoke	mus		4300	3 definitely endangered	7 Shifting	Muscogee Wikipedia
Q33265	Cheyenne	chy:Tsêhesenêstsestôtse	chy		2400	3 definitely endangered	8a Moribund	Cheyenne Wikipedia
