= Driggs family =

American business family

The Driggs family is an American business family descended from Joseph Driggs of Middletown and East Haddam, Connecticut (died November 1748).

== Notable members of the family ==
- Adam Driggs (born 1965), Maricopa County Arizona Superior Court judge as of 2017
- Deborah Driggs (born 1963), actress, and businesswoman; Playboy Playmate for March 1990
- Edmund H. Driggs (1865–1946), United States Representative from New York from 1897 to 1901
- Elsie Driggs (1898–1992), painter of the 1920s and 1930s American modern-art movement, Precisionism
- Frank Driggs (1930–2011), Great Depression-era Grammy Award-winning musician and author
- H. Wayne Driggs (1902–1951), original scriptwriter for the Hill Cumorah Pageant, used from 1937 to 1987
- Howard R. Driggs (1873–1963), prominent author, and professor at the University of Utah between 1897 and 1923, and of New York University from 1923 until 1942. He was emeritus professor from 1942 until his death
- John B. Driggs (1852–1914), medical doctor and teacher, who served at the mission station of the Episcopal Church of the United States at Point Hope, Alaska, c. 1890 – c. 1910
- Jeff Driggs (born 1961), champion clog dancer, choreographer and entertainer; 2014 inductee to the America's Clogging Hall of Fame (ACHF)
- John D. Driggs (1927–2014), Mayor of Phoenix, Arizona from 1970 to 1974
- John F. Driggs (1813–1877), United States Representative from Michigan; the first person to represent Michigan's 6th congressional district
- Junius ElMarion Driggs (1907–1994), co-founder and CEO of Western Savings and Loan, which operated between 1929 and 1990); president of the Mesa Arizona Temple from 1975 to 1980
- The King Sisters, a big band-era vocal group consisting of six sisters from the extended Driggs family of entertainers
- Lois Driggs Cannon (1929–2018), wife of astronaut Buzz Aldrin
