= Ipiutak site =

Archaeological site in northwest Alaska, US

- Ipiutak Site
- U.S. National Register of Historic Places
- U.S. National Historic Landmark
- Alaska Heritage Resources Survey
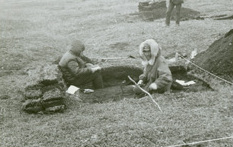
- Excavating the Ipiutak Site
- Location: Address restricted
- Nearest city: Point Hope, Alaska
- NRHP reference No.: 66000157
- AHRS No.: XPH-003

Significant dates
- Added to NRHP: October 15, 1966
- Designated NHL: January 20, 1961

The Ipiutak Site is a large archaeological site at Point Hope on the northwestern coast of Alaska, United States. Located on the Tikigaq spit, it is one of the largest precontact village sites in Arctic Alaska and forms part of a larger archaeological district associated with the ancestors of the Iñupiat.

The site contains more than 500 abandoned house depressions and is the type site for the Ipiutak culture, which arose as early as 100–200 BCE and collapsed around 800 CE. Many of the houses were associated with large whale and walrus bones, and whale mandibles marked important spaces within the settlement.

Excavations uncovered houses, over 100 burials, and a large collection of artifacts, including elaborately carved objects made from ivory, wood, bone, and stone.

The site is renowned for its mortuary offerings, openwork ivory carvings, and insights into a hunting society that relied on marine mammals and caribou.

The site was designated a National Historic Landmark in 1961 and was added to the National Register of Historic Places in 1966.

== Location ==
The Ipiutak Site is located at Tikiġaq, the Iñupiaq name for present-day Point Hope, on the northwestern coast of Alaska, United States. Tikiġaq occupies a narrow spit of land that extends west into the Chukchi Sea. The site is one of the largest precontact archaeological village sites in Arctic Alaska.

The Ipiutak Site forms part of a larger archaeological district that includes Qimiarzuk (Jabbertown), the Tikigaq historic cemetery, and other archaeological sites on the spit. Together with the modern community of Point Hope, these sites document the long history of the Iñupiat and their ancestors in the region.

== Description ==
The site consists of nearly 500 abandoned house depressions located along four beach ridges on the Tikigaq spit. The rows of houses were once thought to represent planned roads or "avenues", creating the impression of a carefully organized settlement. However, many of the houses are too close together to have been occupied at the same time and radiocarbon dating suggests that the settlement developed gradually over approximately 300 to 400 years.

Archaeologists estimate that about 125 to 200 people lived at the site during any one generation and occupied 20 to 30 houses. Earlier population estimates of more than 4,000 people are no longer accepted.

Many of the house ruins were surrounded by large whale and walrus bones, many of which remain visible at the site today. Whale mandibles marked important spaces within the settlement and are still used to demarcate important spaces in nearby Point Hope.

The site preserves evidence of daily life from more than 1,800 years ago, including objects made from ivory, wood, bone, and stone.

== Excavation history ==
Archaeologists Helge Larsen, Froelich Rainey, and J. Louis Giddings conducted major excavations at the site between 1939 and 1941. Their work recovered thousands of artifacts and numerous burials from what became the type site of the Ipiutak culture.

In 1945, Larsen divided the collection among the University of Alaska Museum, the National Museum of Denmark, and the American Museum of Natural History. Some artifacts sent to New York for photography were later lost at sea while being returned to Alaska.

== Graves and mortuary offerings ==
The graves at Ipiutak can be divided into coffin and shallow burials: the deeper graves contain log coffins typically with one body (but sometimes more) and are about 50 cm below the ground, while the shallow burials may have been not dug at all, with the bodies placed into wooden frames and left at the surface.

The site is renowned for its mortuary offerings, two of which were termed masks. Both of them are composite objects that had wooden backings, which were lost. One Point Hope Ipiutak mask represents a human face with facial tattoos, a gaping mouth and blowfly larvae issuing from its nostrils; the symbolism of these markings is not known for certain: one possibility is a shamanistic meaning connected with Inuit myths about worms; another is an emulation of parasite-infested caribou. A very similar "maskoid" is reported from Deering, that is dated between 600 and 800 CE. The other mask is smaller and found in a coffin with a man, a woman and a child; the mark was placed on the child's chest. This mask has cheek and lip plugs as well as 14 ivory pendants with carved representation of animals. Several mouth masks have also been found in the graves.

== Material culture and lifeways ==
=== Culture ===
Ipiutak is generally considered to be a late phase of the Norton tradition and one of the ancestors of the historic Inuit.

The Ipiutak culture emerged as early as 100–200 BCE and disappeared around 800 CE. Its geographic range extended from south of the Bering Strait across the Brooks Range and possibly as far north as Point Barrow.

=== Material culture ===
Two technological hallmarks of the Ipiutak culture were its finely crafted stone tools, particularly arrow points, and its lack of ceramics. The culture is known for a distinctive artistic style based on linear, circular, and dot motifs that closely resembles that of the Old Bering Sea culture of the Bering Strait region and adjacent Siberia.

The original excavators, Larsen and Rainey, linked Ipiutak's openwork animal-carving style with the distant Scytho-Siberian cultures of Ukraine, although later researchers found little evidence to support this interpretation. Instead, Ipiutak shares many similarities with the widespread Norton culture of western and northern Alaska.

The site produced abundant ivory artifacts carved in a distinctive openwork style. Many depict animals, including walruses, bears, wolves, birds, loons, and seals, while human figures are comparatively rare. The carvings were engraved with iron burins, a type of carving tool. Almost all of the ivory carvings have been recovered from shallow burials.

=== Lifeways ===
The subsistence basis of Ipiutak was sea mammal hunting, most importantly of ringed seal and walrus, although caribou hunting was also crucial.

== Significance ==
Several other sites have also been linked to Ipiutak: at Cape Krusenstern, Itivlik Lake, Hahanudan Lake, Feniak Lake, Onion Portage Archeological District, Deering. Point Spencer and Anaktuvuk Pass, Alaska. The culture is noted for the elaborateness of its artwork, which seems to be an ancestor of Inuit art. It is still unclear why the Ipiutak apparently did not hunt whale or make pottery, considering that they lived in highly developed settlements.

== Historic designation ==
The site was declared a National Historic Landmark in 1961 and was added to the National Register of Historic Places in 1966.

== See also ==
- Birnirk culture
- Iñupiat
- Norton tradition
- Tikiġaġmiut
