= Driggs =

Driggs is a surname. Notable people with the surname include:

- Driggs family, prominent American Family
- Deborah Driggs, model, author, and actress
- Edmund H. Driggs, United States Representative from New York
- Elsie Driggs, American painter mostly known for her contributions to the Precisionism movement of the 1920s
- John Driggs (disambiguation)

== See also ==
- Driggs family
