= Stevens-Haustgen House =

Coordinates: 33°26′59″N 112°03′57″W

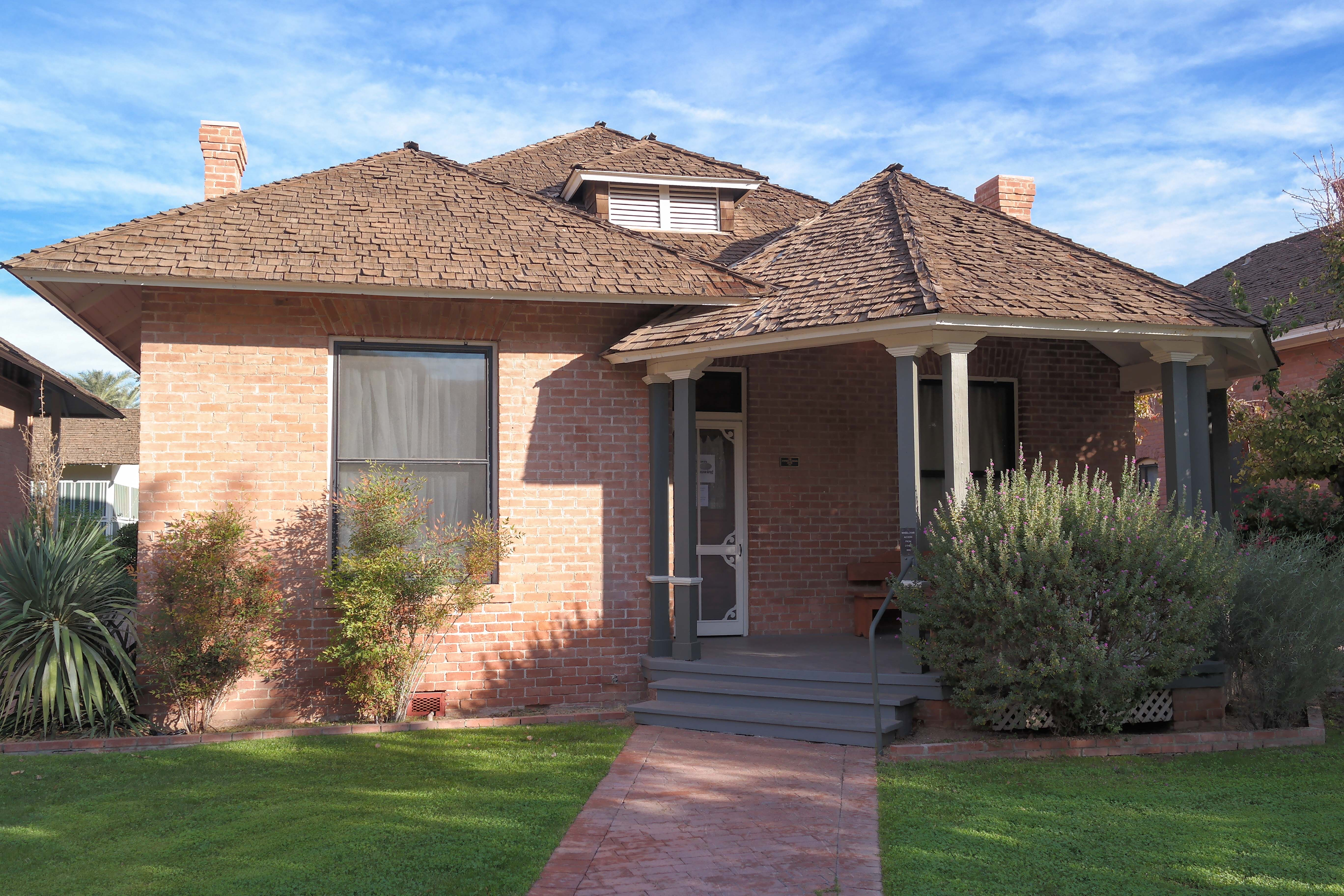
The cottage in 2013

The Stevens-Haustgen House at 614 East Adams Street in downtown Phoenix, Arizona is part of Heritage Square, a collection of historic houses anchored by the Rosson House. The land was originally part of the Rosson House property, which was subdivided in 1897. This lot was sold to Mary V. Hughes, who also purchased other lots. Hughes sold it to Constance Stevens in 1900. In 1900 or 1901 this Victorian cottage was built as a rental property. The house was bought in 1904 by the firm of Akers and Tritle, who in turn sold it to Edward Haustgen of Luxembourg in 1911, who, with his sister Anna and Marguerite continued to operate it as a rental property. The Haustgens owned other properties which are now part of Heritage Square, as well as in other locales in the area.

The house was formerly the home of the Arizona Doll & Toy Museum, which subsequently relocated to Glendale. The house is now operated as Heritage Gallery, which hosts rotating art exhibits.

The Stevens-Haustgen House was added to the National Register of Historic Places in 1985 as part of "Phoenix Townsite", along with the Stevens House, the Hughes-Stevens Duplex, and other houses in Heritage Square, which is now part of Phoenix's Heritage and Science Park.
