= F. S. Baird Machine Shop =

- U.S. National Register of Historic Places
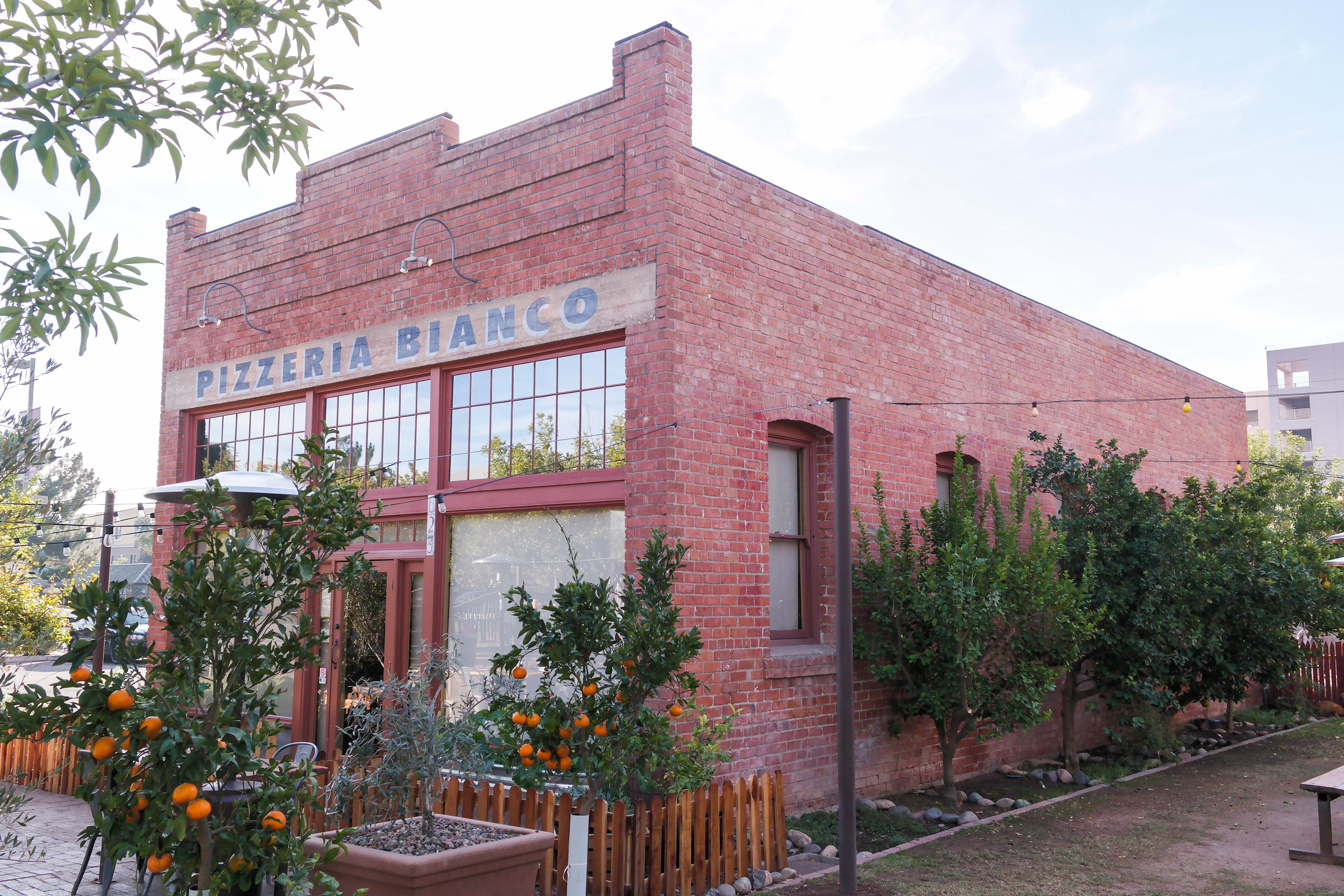
- (2013)
- Location: 532 East Adams Street, Phoenix, Arizona
- Coordinates: 33°26′57″N 112°03′54″W
- Built: 1912
- NRHP reference No.: 85002047
- Added to NRHP: September 4, 1985

The F. S. Baird Machine Shop, located at 632 East Adams Street between North 6th and North 7th Streets in downtown Phoenix, Arizona, is part of Heritage Square, a collection of historic buildings dating from the city's earliest days. It was built in 1928 by Kathryn Baird, who opened a machine shop there with her son Arthur in 1929. After Arthur left the business in 1931, George W. Wilson operated a machine shop business in the building until 1933, followed by various other owners until 1941. Between 1947 and 1964, a variety of industrial shops occupied the space. In 1978, the city of Phoenix purchased the vacant building to add it to Heritage Square, which is anchored by the nearby Rosson House. It is currently the site of a pizza restaurant.

The one-bay building has a pitched truss roof with stepped parapet eaves, segmented arch double-hung wood windows and a double-hung entrance in the center. It was added to the National Register of Historic Places in 1985.

== See also ==
- National Register of Historic Places listings in Phoenix, Arizona
