= John Driggs =

John Driggs may refer to:

- John B. Driggs (1852–1914), American physician, teacher, and recorder of native folktales in Northwest Alaska
- John D. Driggs (1927–2014), American politician, mayor of Phoenix, Arizona
- John F. Driggs (1813–1877), American politician from Michigan
