= Heritage and Science Park =

- Heritage Square (Phoenix Townsite)
- U.S. National Register of Historic Places
- U.S. Historic district
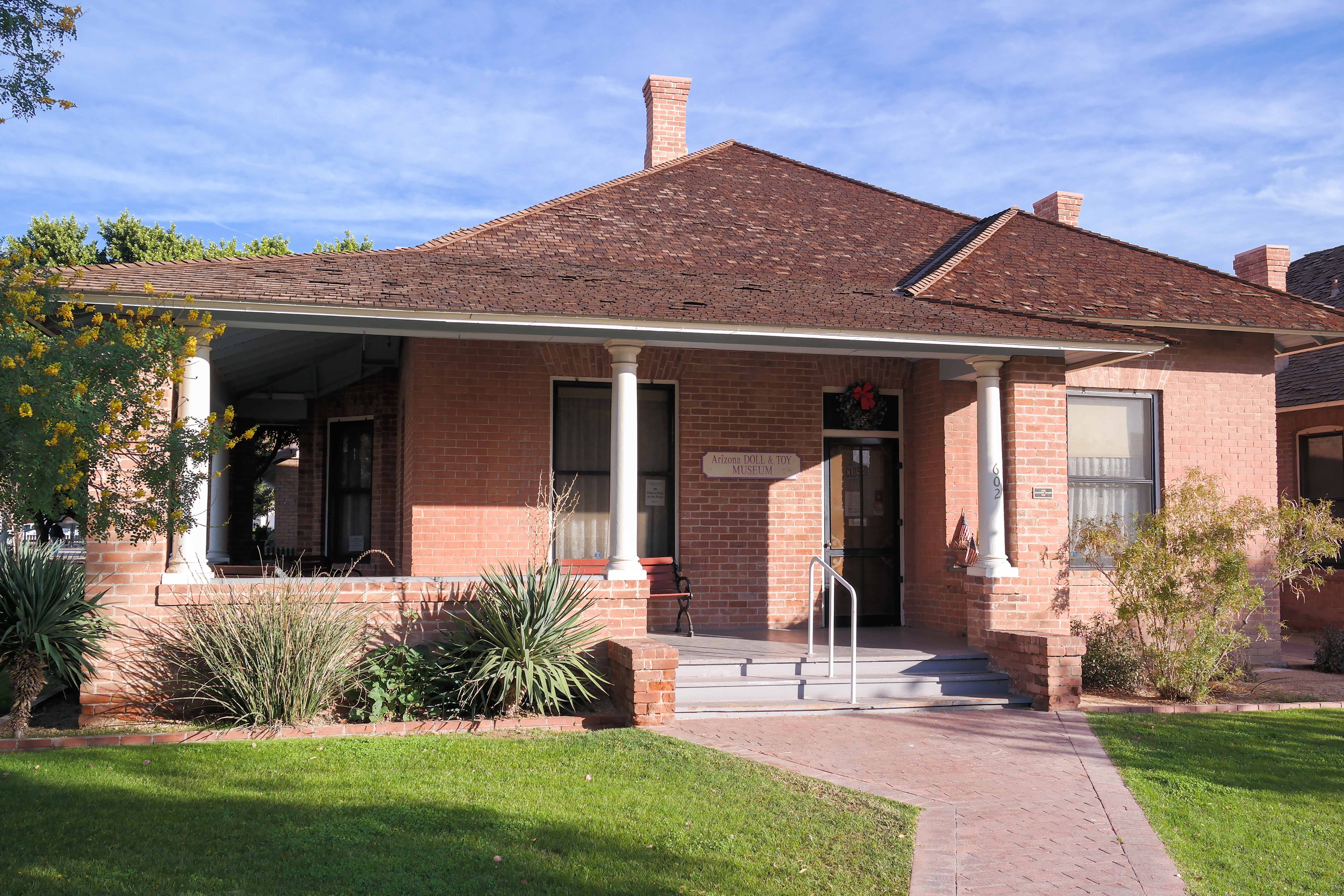
- The Stevens House (1901) in 2013
- Location: Bounded by E. Monroe, E. Washington, N. 6th and N. 7th Streets, Phoenix, Arizona
- Coordinates: 33°26′59″N 112°03′54″W
- Built: 1875-1923
- NRHP reference No.: 78000550
- Added to NRHP: November 7, 1978

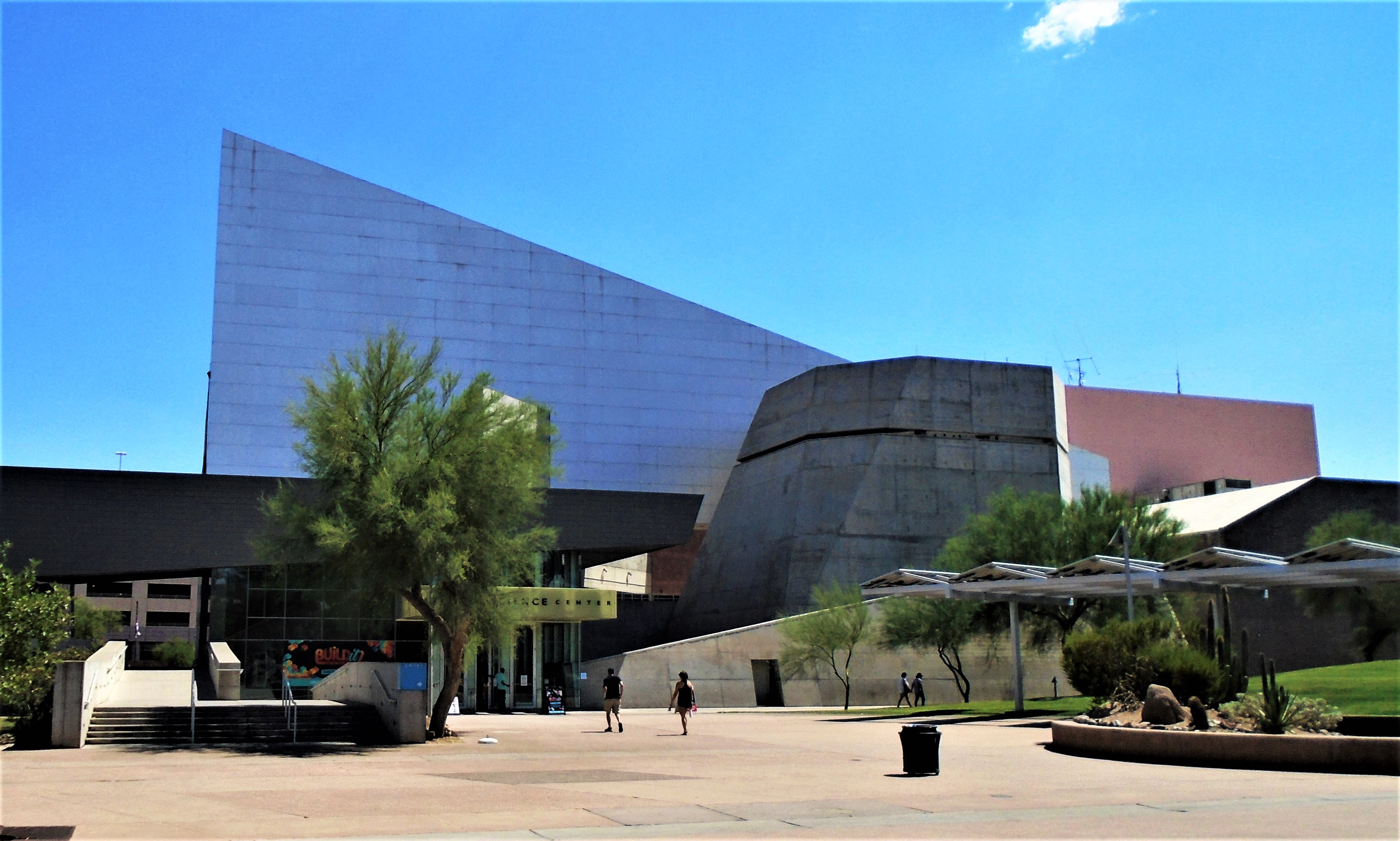
The Arizona Science Center in 2021

Heritage and Science Park, located between East Monroe, East Washington, North 5th and North 7th Streets in downtown Phoenix, Arizona includes Heritage Square – a historic site anchored by the Rosson House – the Arizona Science Center, and the building of the former Phoenix Museum of History.

== History ==
Heritage Square sits on the last remaining residential block of the original site of the town of Phoenix. It tells the story of how Phoenix residents lived before Arizona became a state. It is also home to restaurants and a museum shop.

Preservation efforts for Heritage Square began in the 1970s when then Mayor John D. Driggs stepped in to preserve the Rosson House. Architect Robert Frankeberger designed the park, which was designated "Historic Heritage Park". In 1976, preservation and restoration of the historic homes and the addition of the Lath House began, and the park opened in 1980.

The majority of Heritage Square was added to the National Register of Historic Places in 1985 under the name "Phoenix Townsite".

In 1996-97 the Arizona Science Center and the Phoenix Museum of History moved next to the site of Heritage Square from their prior locations, and the expanded campus was given the name "Heritage and Science Park". The Arizona Doll & Toy Museum was also formerly located in the Stevens-Haustgen House. All locations are connected via East 6th Street and East Adams Street, which act as a pedestrian walkway that runs between East Monroe and North 7th Streets.

== Buildings ==
Heritage and Science park includes:

- Heritage Square (listed on NRHP as "Phoenix Townsite"):
  - *The Rosson House Museum (1875) – 113 N. 6th St. @ N. Monroe St.
  - The Burgess Carriage House (c.1881) – 115 N. 6th St., the only building moved from elsewhere
  - The Bouvier-Teeter House (1899) – 622 E. Adams St.
  - The Teeter Carriage House (1899) – 618 E. Adams St., location of Royal Coffee Bar
  - The Silva House (1900) – 628 E. Adams St. @ N. 7th Street
  - The Stevens House (1901) – 602 E. Admas St. @ N. 6th St., also known as The Bungalow, location of the Museum Store
  - The Stevens-Haustgen House (c.1901) – 614 E. Adams St.
  - The Thomas House (1909) – 609 E. Adams St., location of Bar Bianco (not listed on NRHP)
  - The Hughes-Stevens Duplex (1923) – 115 N. 6th St., offices
  - *The F. S. Baird Machine Shop (1929) – 623 E. Adams St. @ N. 7th St., location of Pizzeria Bianco
  - Lath House (c.1980) – 120 N. 7th St. @ N. Monroe St., (not listed on NRHP)
- Arizona Science Center (founded 1984, current location 1997) – 600 East Washington St. btwn. N.5th & N.7th Sts.
- Phoenix Museum of History (founded c.1920s, current location 1996, closed 2009, building now operated by the Science Center) – 105 N. 5th St.
- a parking garage

* Individually listed on the National Register of Historic Places

== Gallery ==
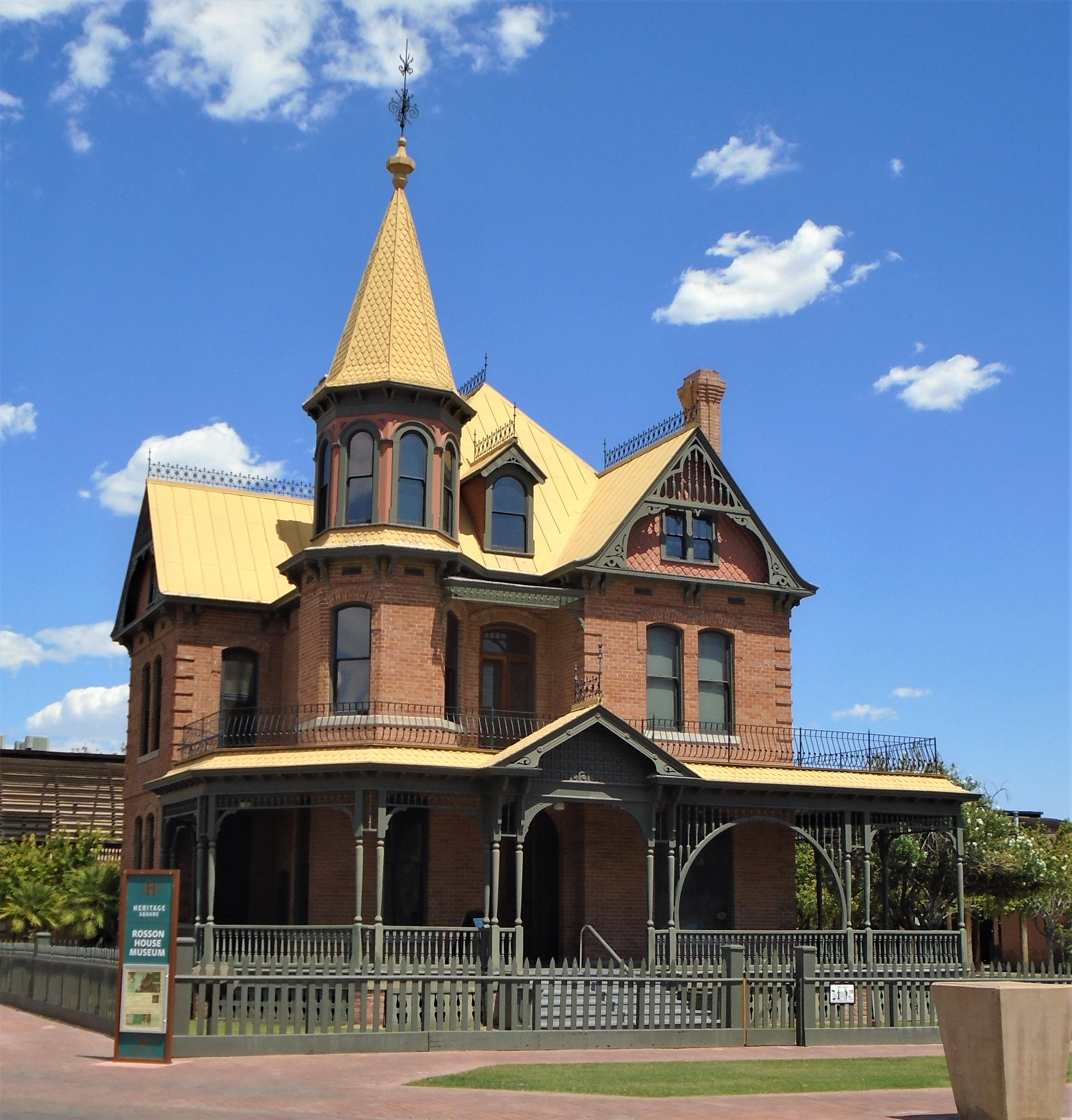
Rosson House

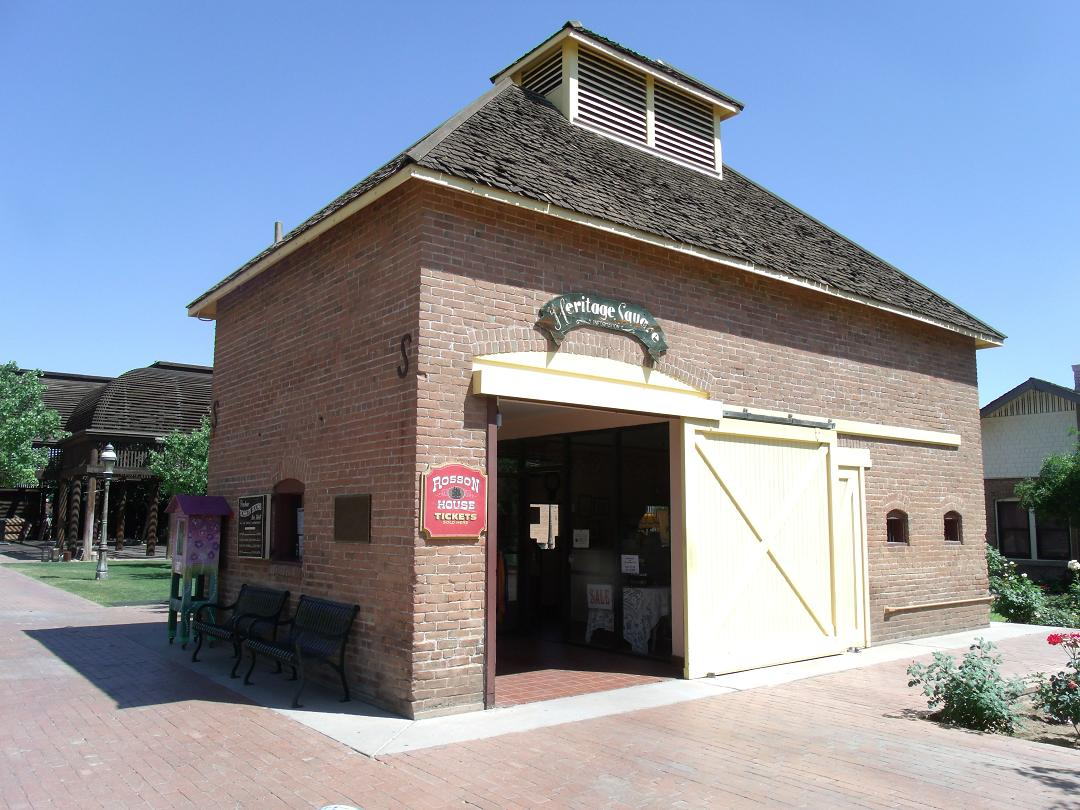
Burgess Carriage House

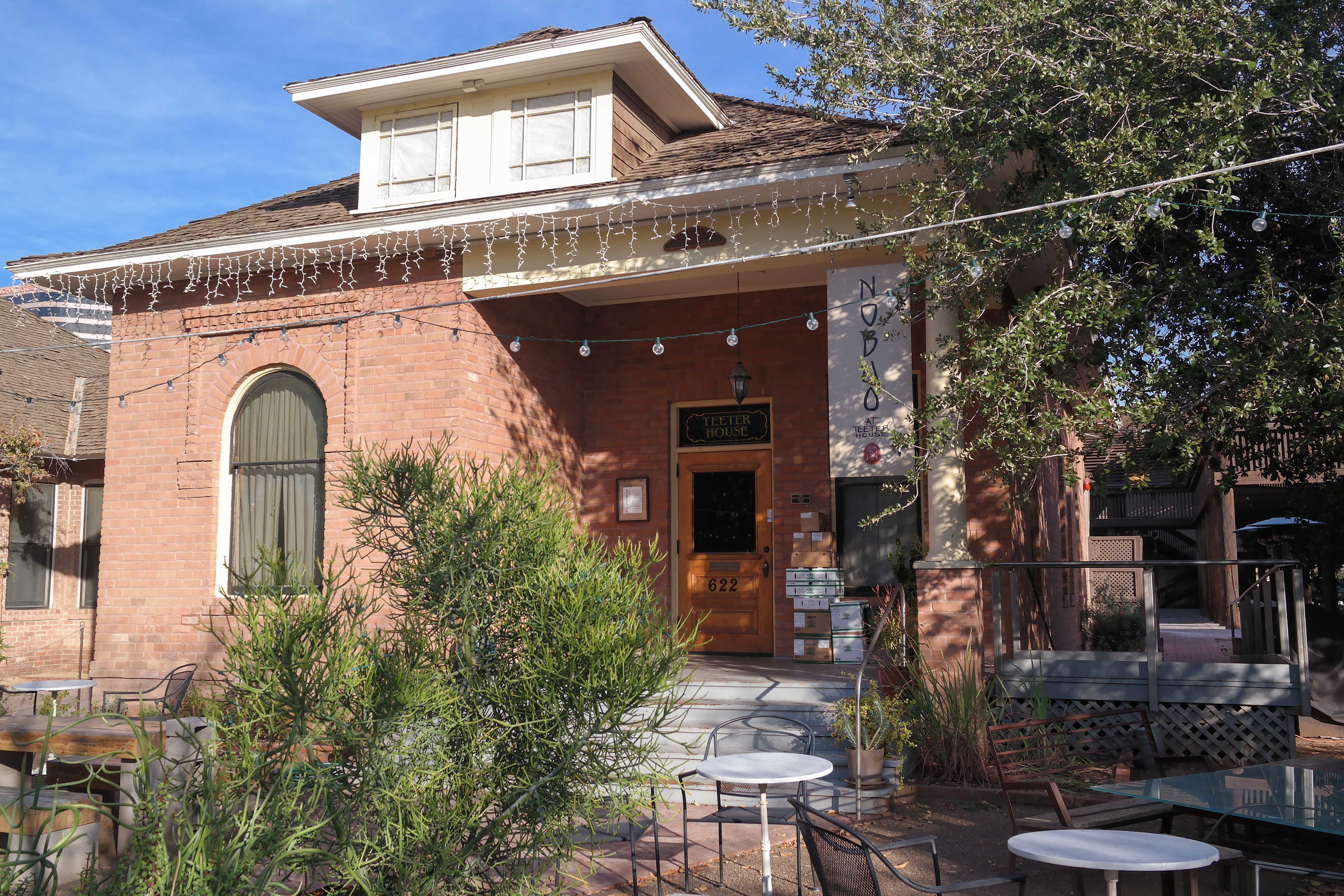
Bouvier-Teeter House

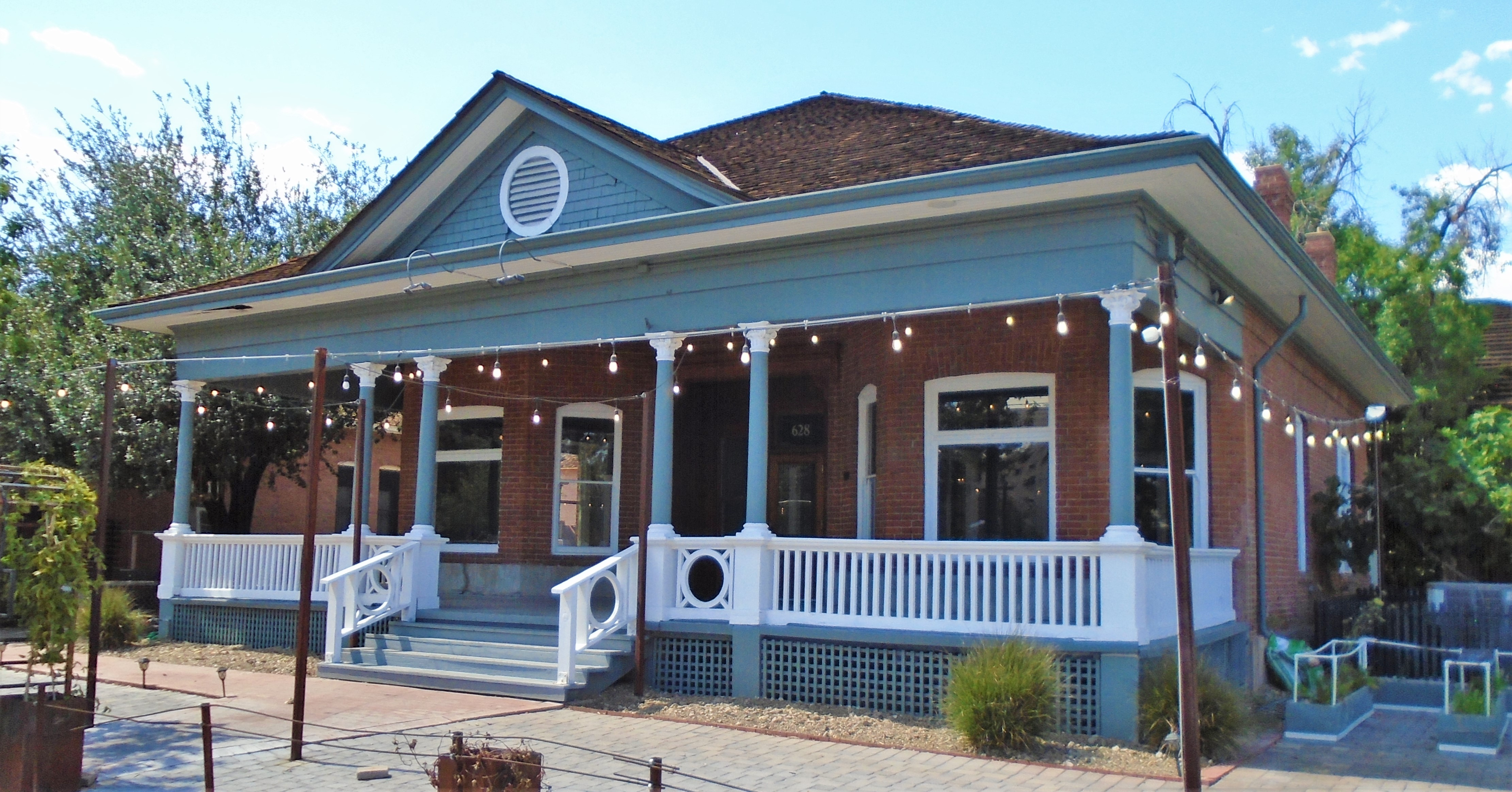
Silva House

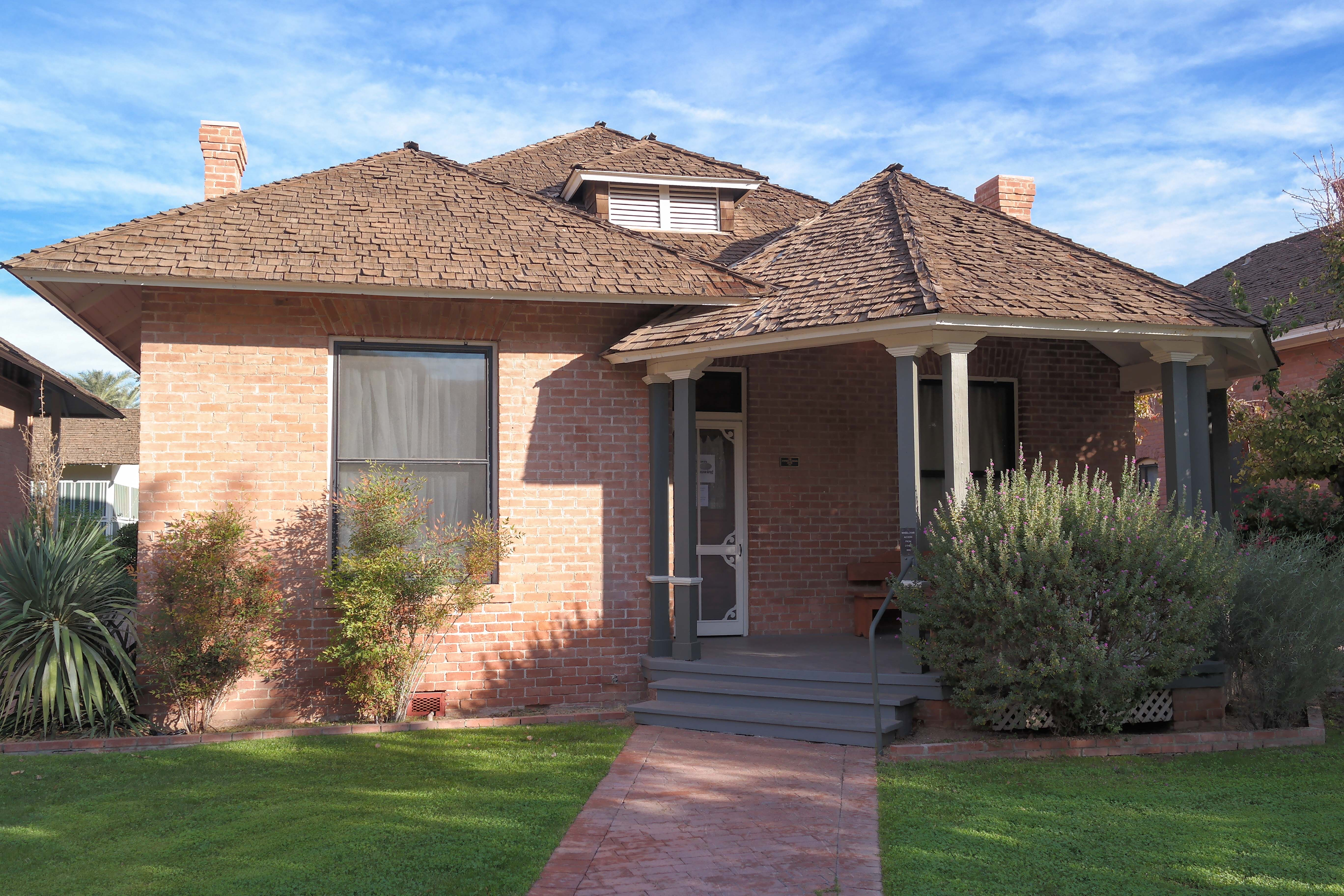
Stenens-Haustgen House

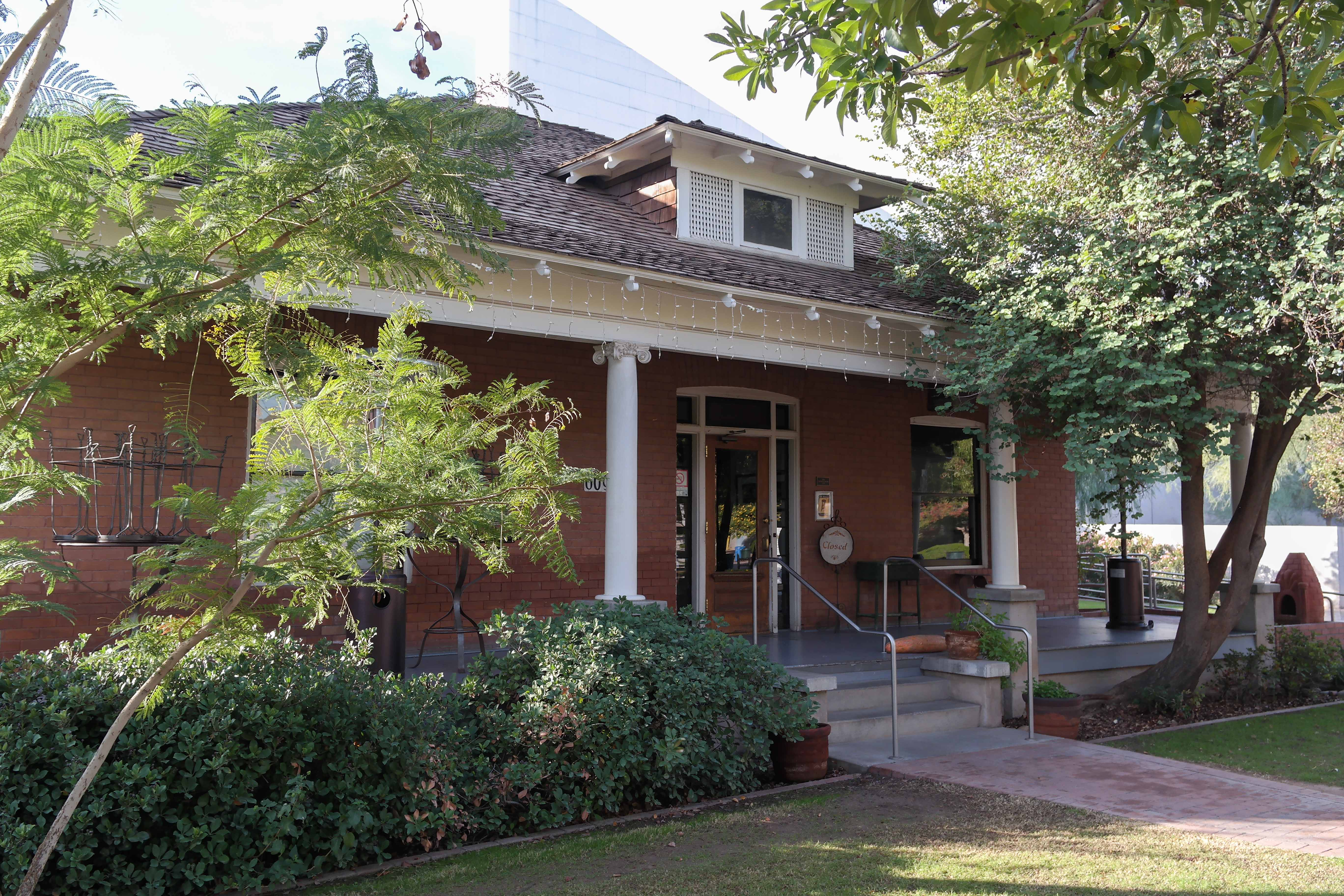
Thomas House

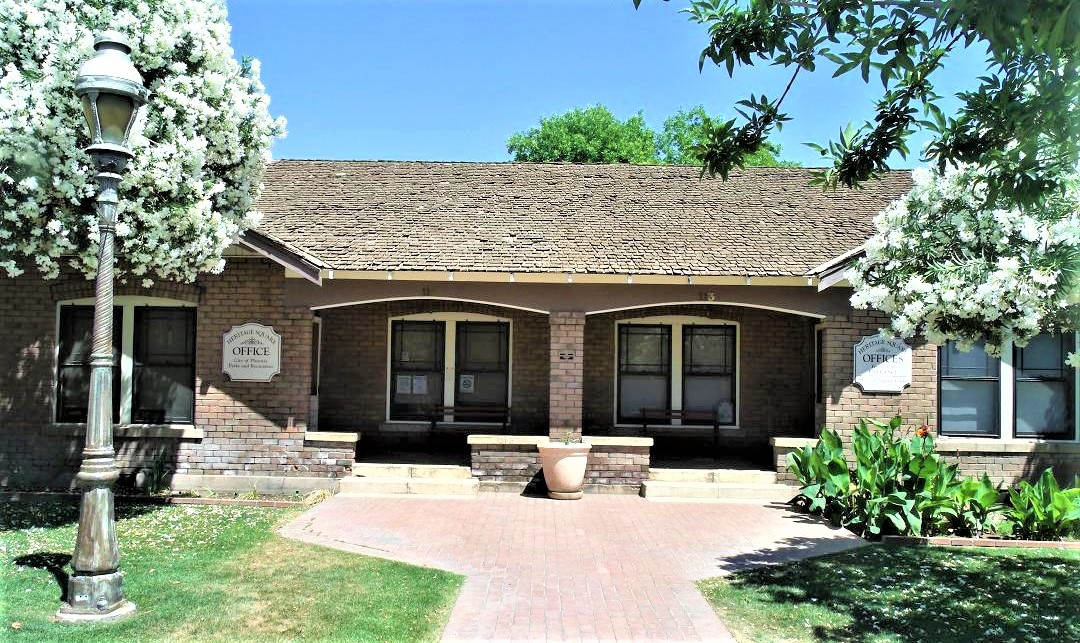
Hughes-Stevens Duplex

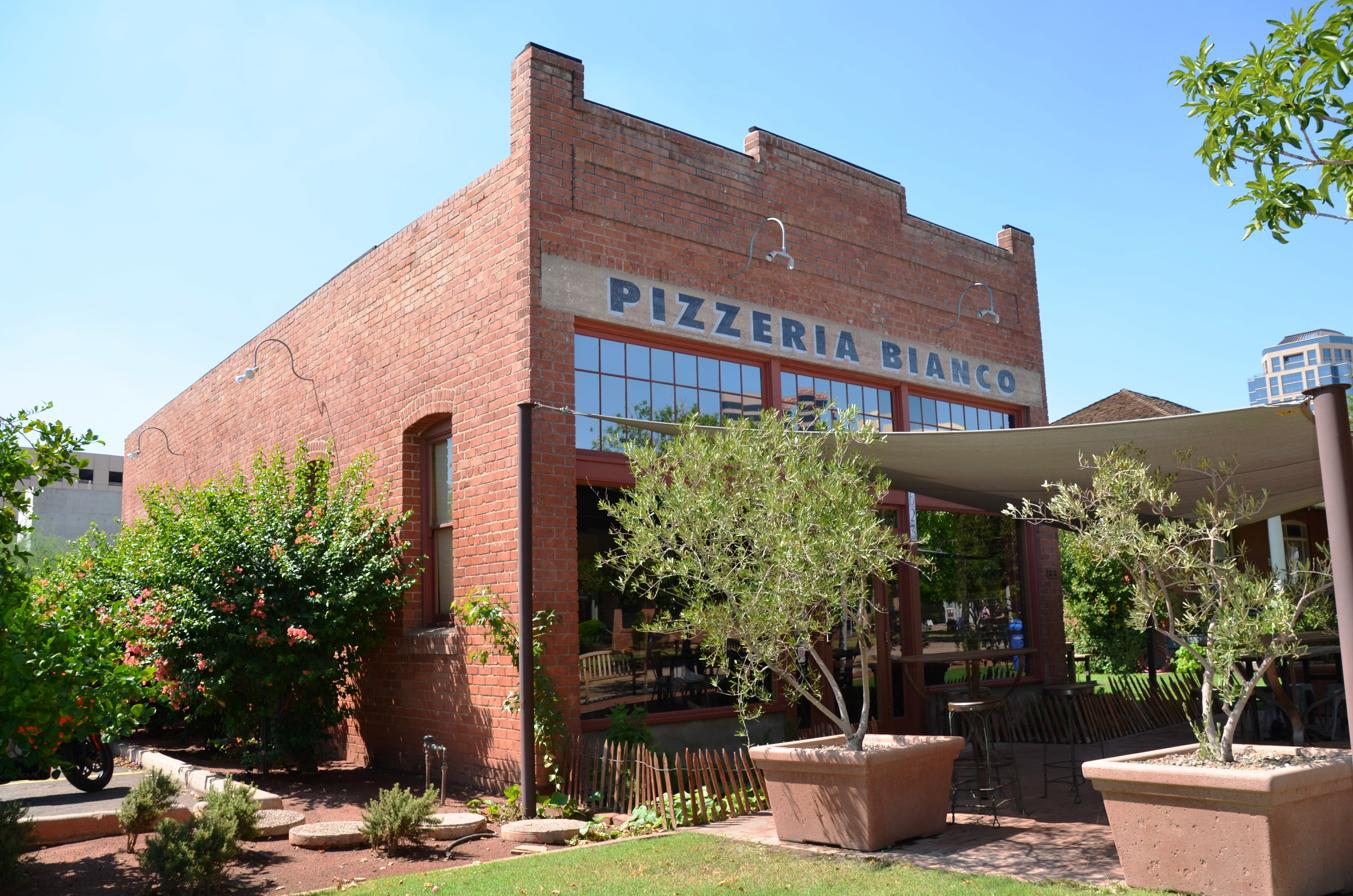
F. S. Baird Machine Shop

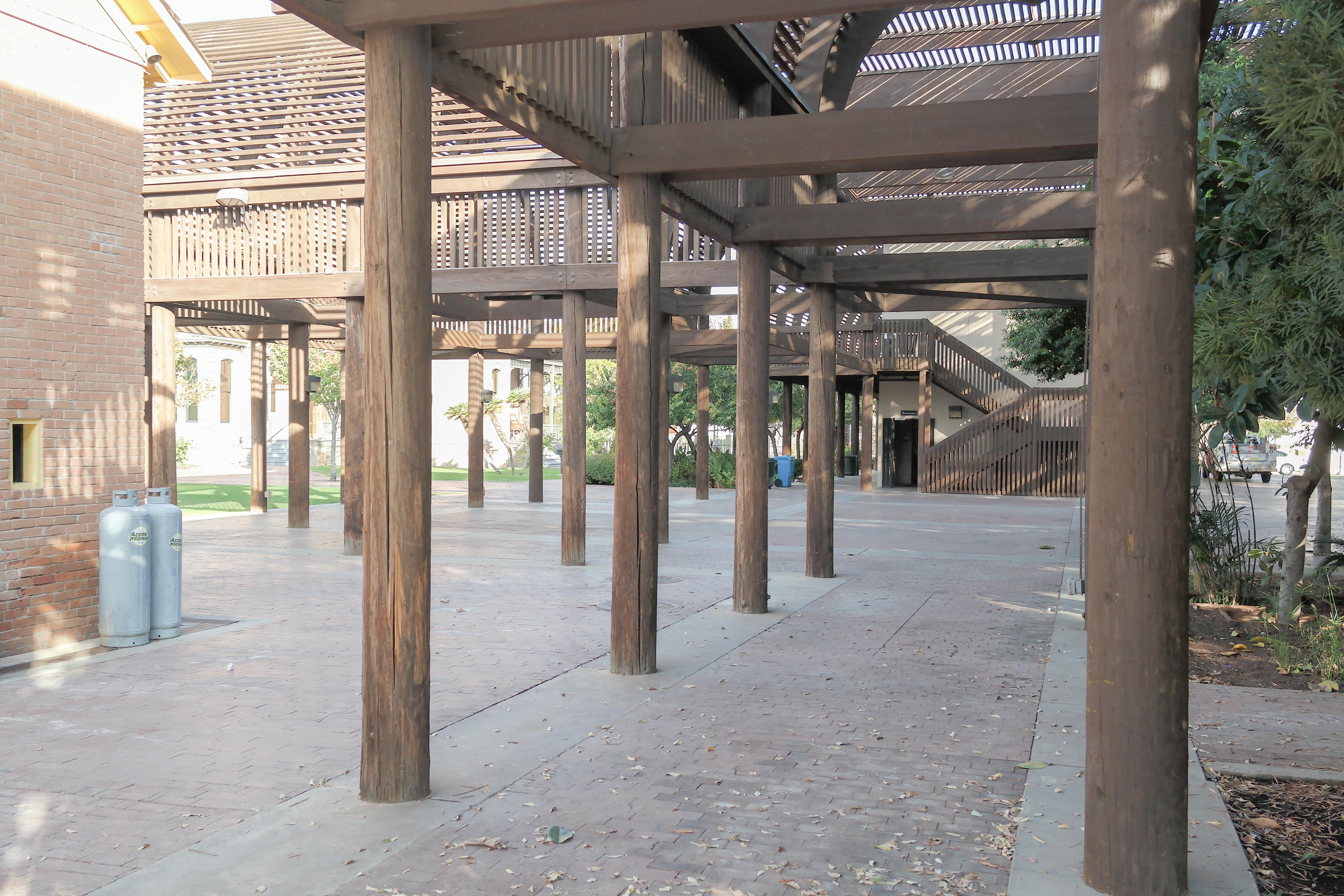
Lath House
