= Arizona Doll & Toy Museum =

Museum in Glendale, Arizona

Coordinates: 33.5420°N 112.1858°W

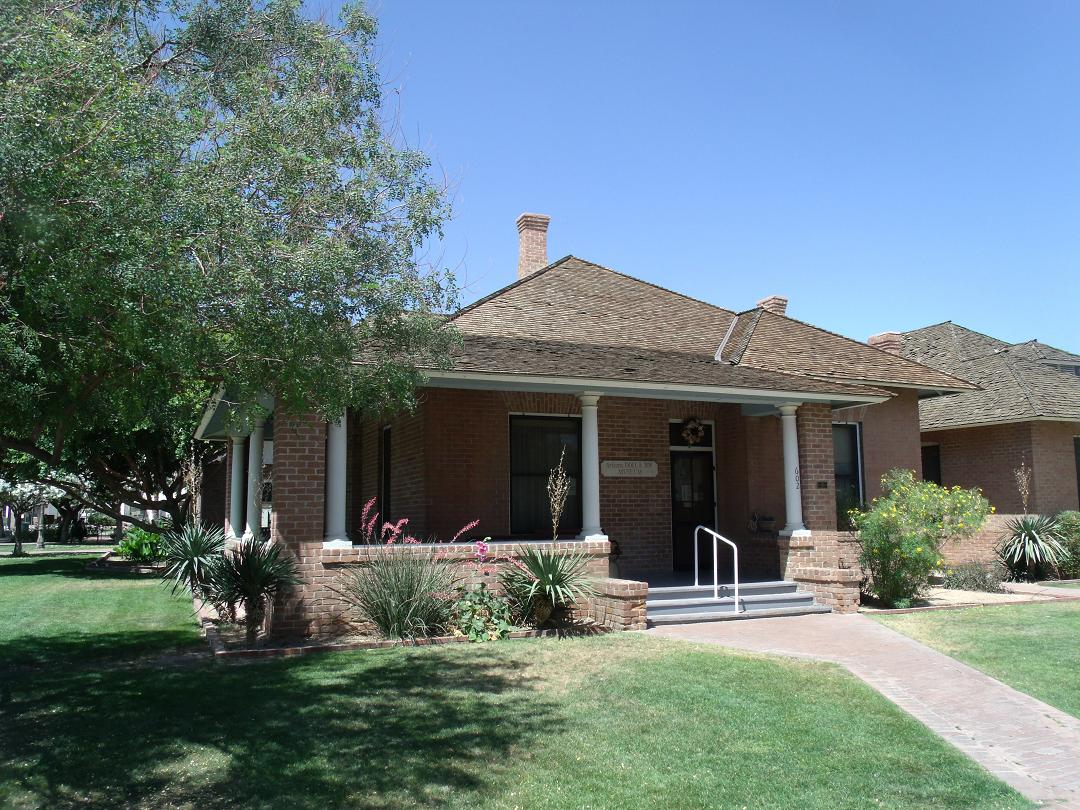
- Established: 1987
- Location: West Myrtle Avenue, Glendale, Arizona
- Type: Doll and Toy Museum
- Collection size: European and American dolls, modern and antique
- Founder: Inez McCrary
- Curator: Inez McCrary (served for twenty years)
- Website: Official Website

The Arizona Doll & Toy Museum is located on West Myrtle Avenue in Glendale, Arizona.

It was founded in Phoenix in 1987 by Inez McCrary and when located at Heritage and Science Park in the Stevens-Haustgen House, featured four rooms of exhibits including a 1912 schoolroom, hat shop and dry goods store. McCrary served as the museum's curator for twenty years and the museum took visitors through both European and American doll styles. The collection features modern dolls, as well as one that is more than three hundred years old.
