= Junius Driggs =

American businessman (1907–1994)

Junius ElMarion Driggs
- Born: June 28, 1907
- Died: July 8, 1994 (aged 87); Mesa, Arizona
- Occupation: Businessman
- Spouse: Bernice Elizabeth Crouse
- Children: 5

Junius ElMarion Driggs (June 28, 1907 – July 8, 1994) was the CEO and co-founder of the later defunct Western Savings and Loan. He was also the president of the Mesa Arizona Temple of the Church of Jesus Christ of Latter-day Saints (LDS Church) from 1975 to 1980.

== Early life ==
Junius was born in Driggs, Idaho, in 1907 to Don Carlos Driggs who founded the town, and May Jerusha Robison.

== Career ==
Driggs was President of Western Financial until his retirement in 1976. He was replaced by his nephew John Driggs During his tenure as Chairman, Driggs made a name for himself in the business community of Arizona and was eventually named to the elite group known as the Phoenix 40 along with Eugene C. Pulliam, Karl Eller, and others.

== Church service ==
=== Temple presidency ===
Junius was called in 1975 by LDS Church church president Spencer W. Kimball to serve as the 9th temple president of the Mesa Arizona Temple. While president, his primary responsibilities included greeting temple patrons and interviewing recommended temple workers as well as recommending temple workers. He often attend regional stake conferences and local sacrament meetings, where he urged church members to carry out genealogical work and to attend and assist in the performance of temple ordinances. He was assisted by two counselors as well as his wife and the wives of the two counselors, referred to as the matron and the assistants to the matron respectively.

In larger temples, like the Mesa temple, presidents usually serve for three years, but Driggs served for five years until 1980. Driggs had served as a stake president prior to his calling as temple president in addition to his having been a regional representative of the Twelve.

== Books ==
- Looking Over My Life (1988) ASIN B00071KWDW, ASIN B00BBISG6K – official autobiography
