= Arizona Science Center =

Science museum in Phoenix, Arizona

Coordinates: 33.4486469°N 112.0665931°W

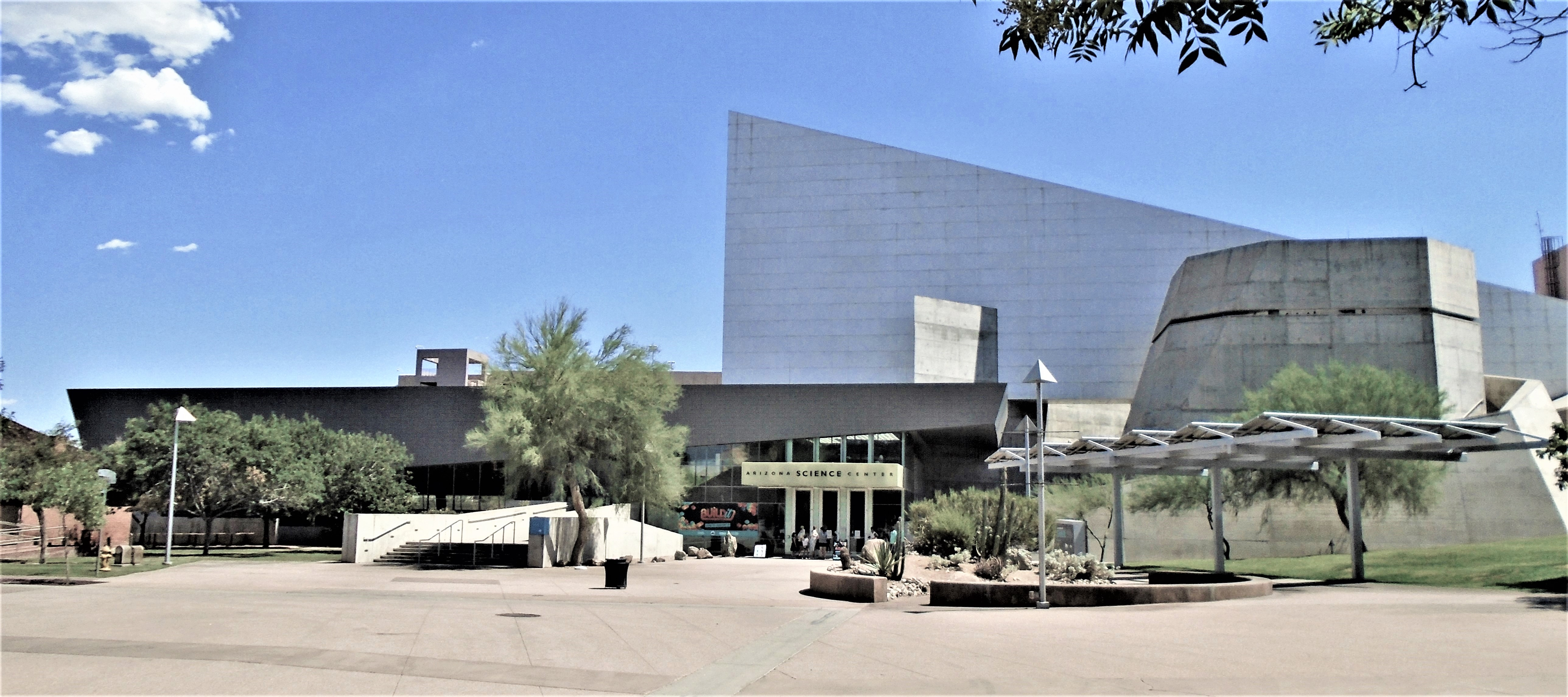
Arizona Science Center in 2021

Arizona Science Center, at 600 Washington St in Downtown Phoenix, Arizona, is a science museum located in Heritage and Science Park. It was founded in 1984 as the Arizona Museum of Science & Technology in a downtown storefront. Its current building, designed by Antoine Predock, was completed in 1997. Along with daily demonstrations throughout the center, the Center provides shows in the Dorrance DOME and in a five-story, giant screen IMAX Theater.

== History ==
Arizona Science Center, formerly the Arizona Museum of Science & Technology, was conceived in 1980 as a pilot science center by the Junior League of Phoenix. The Science Center opened its doors to the public in 1984 as a small 10,000-square-foot (930 m^{2}) storefront exhibition space located in the parking garage level of the downtown Phoenix Hyatt. The Science Center's first year of operation saw more than 87,000 visitors. Following sustained demand, construction of the 120,000-square-foot (11,000 m^{2}), Antoine Predock-designed facility was completed in 1997. When the Science Center moved to its present location, Heritage Square was renamed Heritage and Science Park.

In 2009, the museum reached an agreement with the adjacent, closed Phoenix Museum of History to showcase their collection.

In October 2025, the Science Center reopened its planetarium as the Dorrance DOME, featuring a wraparound LED display with more than 40 million LEDs and seating for approximately 200 people. The renovated venue supports astronomy presentations as well as nature and art-focused programming.

As of April 2026, Tammy Stewart is the Center's Hazel A. Hare President and CEO.

== Exhibitions and programs ==
Among the museum's best-known programs is the annual Snow Week.

Since the beginning, Arizona Science Center has hosted a demonstration Amateur Radio station - originally licensed as KC7LUL, now W7ASC. The hams teach guests to send their name in Morse Code, they demonstrate satellite communication and other modes of amateur communication. The ham station has a page at www.QRZ.com. Enter "W7ASC" in the search box.

In October 2026, the Science Center introduced two new visitor experiences: "Hidden Habitats: Life in the Caves", an expansion of CaveScape featuring live cave-dwelling animals, and CREATE, a redesigned makerspace offering collaborative projects, building activities and crafting workshops.
