= Phoenix Museum of History =

Former museum in Arizona

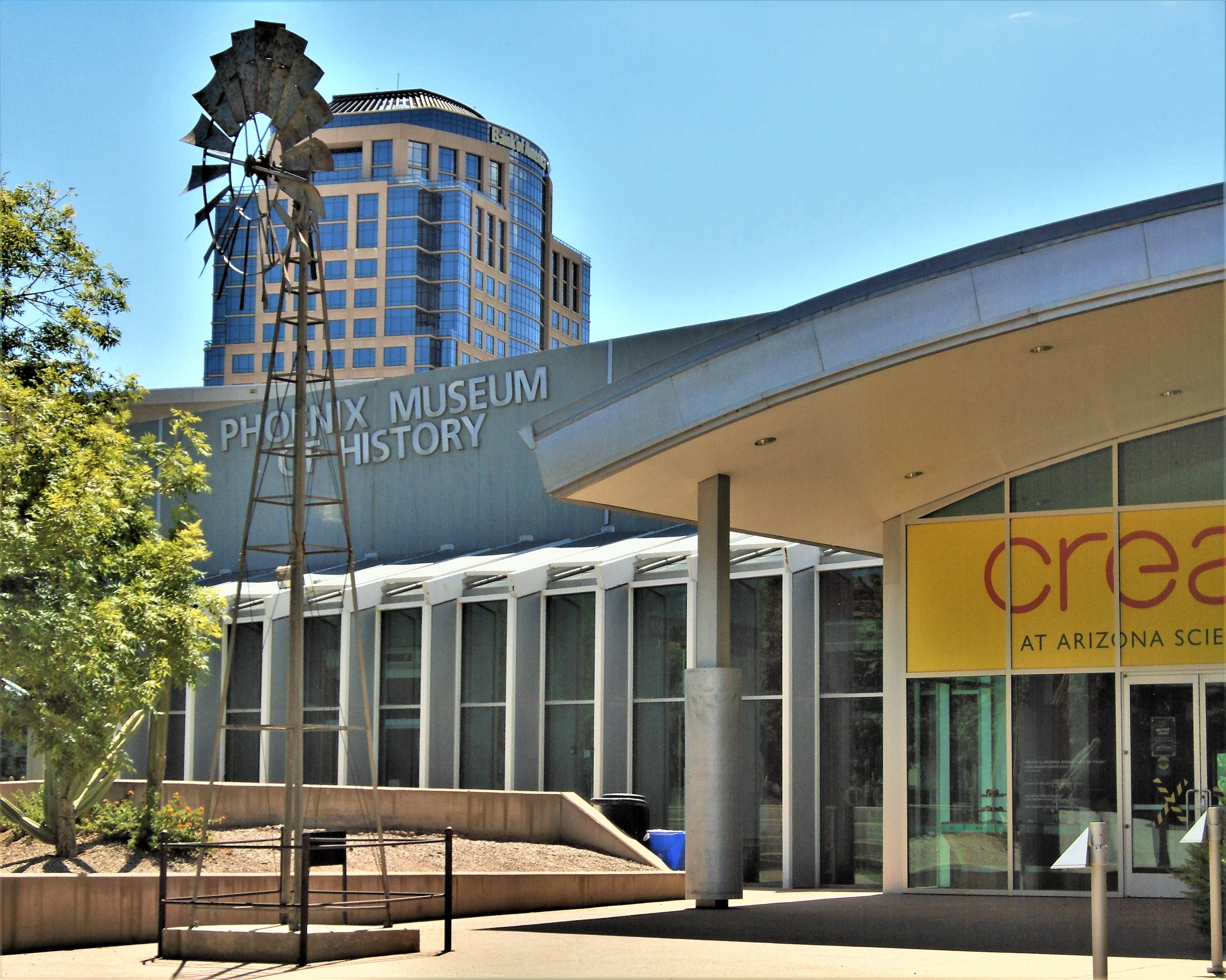
The museum's building in 2021, after it had been taken over by the Arizona Science Center

The Phoenix Museum of History was a history museum located in Phoenix, Arizona's Heritage and Science Park.

The museum opened in the 1920s and its first home was on 10th Avenue and Van Buren where it remained until it moved to the rebranded Heritage & Science Park in 1996 in tandem with the Arizona Science Center thanks to a city bond. Following financial decline, the museum closed on June 30, 2009.

Following its closure, the museum reached an agreement with the Arizona Science Center to house and showcase their collection.
