= Caroline Cannon =

American environmentalist

- Aqugaq
- Occupation: Iñupiat leader
- Known for: Grassroots environmentalism
- Awards: Goldman Environmental Prize (2012)

Caroline Cannon or Aqugaq is an Iñupiaq leader and environmentalist from Point Hope, Alaska. She was awarded the Goldman Environmental Prize in 2012 for her fight for protection of marine ecosystems against pollution from the petroleum industry.

In 2020, Cannon co-authored a chapter, "We Will Fight to Protect the Arctic Ocean and Our Way of Life," with Robert Thompson, Rosemary Ahtuangaruak and Earl Kingik in Arctic Voices: Resistance at the Tipping Point (Seven Stories Press), edited by Subhankar Banerjee.
