= Point Hope, Alaska =

City in Alaska, United States

Point Hope Tikiġaq
- City
- Location in Alaska
- Coordinates: 68°20′49″N 166°45′47″W
- Country: United States
- State: Alaska
- Borough: North Slope
- Incorporated: January 5, 1966

Government
  - Mayor: Eva Kinneeveauk
  - State senator: Donny Olson (D)
  - State rep.: Robyn Burke (D)

Area
  - Total: 5.07 sq mi (13.14 km^{2})
  - Land: 5.00 sq mi (12.95 km^{2})
  - Water: 0.073 sq mi (0.19 km^{2})
- Elevation: 20 ft (6.1 m)

Population (2020)
  - Total: 830
  - Density: 166.0/sq mi (64.08/km^{2})
- Time zone: UTC-09:00 (AKST)
  - Summer (DST): UTC-08:00 (AKDT)
- ZIP code: 99766
- Area code: 907
- FIPS code: 02-61630
- GNIS feature ID: 1408110

Point Hope (Inupiaq: Tikiġaq, IPA: [tikeʁɑq]) is a city in North Slope Borough, Alaska, United States. At the 2010 census the population was 674, down from 757 in 2000. In the 2020 Census, the population rose to 830, making it the second-largest city in the North Slope Borough after Utqiagvik, the seat.

Like many isolated communities in Alaska, the city has no road or rail connections to the outside world, and must be accessed by sea or by air at Point Hope Airport.

== History ==
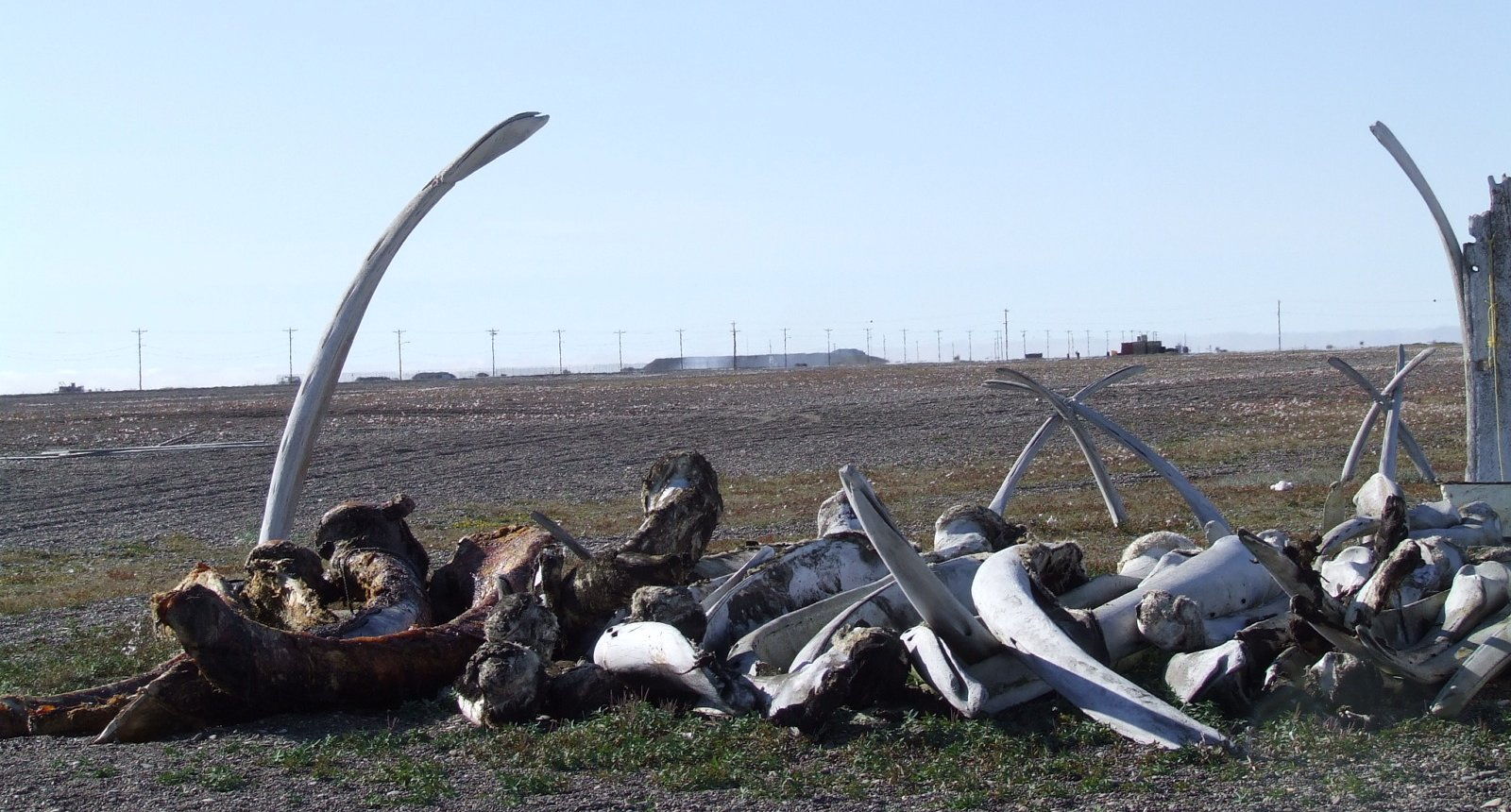
A pile of whale bones in Point Hope, at the spot where celebrations are held at the conclusion of the whaling season.

Before any modern settlement, the Ipiutak lived here.

The descriptive Inuit name of the place, "Tikarakh" or "Tikiġaq", commonly spelled "Tiagara", means "forefinger". It was recorded as "Tiekagagmiut" in 1861 by P. Tikhmeniev Wich of the Russian Hydrographic Department and on Russian Chart 1495 it became "Tiekaga". This ancient village site was advantageous, because the protrusion of Point Hope into the sea brought the whales close to the shore. At Tikigaq, they built semi-subterranean houses using mainly whalebone and driftwood. Point Hope is one of the oldest continually occupied sites in North America. While some of the earlier dwellings have been lost to erosion as the point shrinks, it still provides valuable information to archaeologists on how early Eskimos survived in their harsh environment. The Tikigaq site according to Helge Larsen is, "by far the most extensive and complete one-period site yet discovered and described in the entire circumpolar region."

The first recorded Europeans to sight this cape were Russian explorers Mikhail Vasiliev and Gleb Shishmaryov of the Imperial Russian Navy on the ships Otkrietie and Blagonamierennie. Vasiliev and Shishmaryov named this landhead Mys Golovnina, after Vice Admiral Vasily Golovnin (1776–1831).

The cape at Point Hope was renamed by Captain Frederick William Beechey of the Royal Navy, who wrote on August 2, 1826: "I named it Point Hope in compliment to Sir William Johnstone Hope". According to Archdeacon Stuck Hope was from a "well-known house long connected with the sea". Noel Wien made the first flight here in August 1927.

Point Hope residents successfully opposed Project Chariot in 1962. The project would have involved buried thermonuclear detonations some 30 miles (48 km) from the village to create a deep-water artificial harbor, which would only have been usable about three months out of the year.

== Geography ==
Point Hope is located in the Point Hope landhead, at the northwestern end of the Lisburne Peninsula, on the Chukchi Sea coast, 40 miles (64 km) southwest of Cape Lisburne, Arctic Slope at 68°20′49″N 166°45′47″W (68.347052, -166.762917). It is just above the Arctic Circle.

According to the United States Census Bureau, the city has a total area of 6.4 square miles (17 km^{2}), of which, 6.3 square miles (16 km^{2}) of it is land and 0.1 square miles (0.26 km^{2}) of it (1.09%) is water.

In December 2017, The New York Times profiled Point Hope, reporting that "a surprising, and bittersweet, side effect of global warming" would soon bring Point Hope "one of the fastest internet connections in America". The people largely rely on traditional subsistence activities such as hunting whales. However, the melting of sea ice and thawing of permafrost as a result of global warming threaten the traditional lifestyles.

== Demographics ==
Historical population
Census	Pop.	Note	%±
1880	276		—
1890	301		9.1%
1900	623		107.0%
1910	243		−61.0%
1920	141		−42.0%
1930	139		−1.4%
1940	257		84.9%
1950	264		2.7%
1960	324		22.7%
1970	386		19.1%
1980	464		20.2%
1990	639		37.7%
2000	757		18.5%
2010	674		−11.0%
2020	830		23.1%
U.S. Decennial Census

Point Hope first appeared on the 1880 U.S. Census as the unincorporated Inuit settlement of "Tikirak." All of its 276 residents were Inuit. In 1890, it returned as Point Hope. Out of its 301 residents, 295 were Natives, 5 were White and 1 was "Other." It continued to return as Point Hope in 1900 and 1910. From 1920-40, it returned as the village of "Tigara" (with the alternative name of Point Hope). In 1950, it returned as Point Hope and has continued to do so to date. In 1966, it formally incorporated.

=== 2020 census ===
As of the 2020 census, Point Hope had a population of 830. The median age was 25.4 years. 41.0% of residents were under the age of 18 and 6.6% of residents were 65 years of age or older. For every 100 females there were 108.5 males, and for every 100 females age 18 and over there were 112.1 males age 18 and over.

0.0% of residents lived in urban areas, while 100.0% lived in rural areas.

There were 214 households in Point Hope, of which 55.1% had children under the age of 18 living in them. Of all households, 34.1% were married-couple households, 26.6% were households with a male householder and no spouse or partner present, and 29.9% were households with a female householder and no spouse or partner present. About 22.8% of all households were made up of individuals and 7.4% had someone living alone who was 65 years of age or older.

There were 255 housing units, of which 16.1% were vacant. The homeowner vacancy rate was 0.0% and the rental vacancy rate was 0.0%.

Racial composition as of the 2020 census
Race	Number	Percent
White	59	7.1%
Black or African American	5	0.6%
American Indian and Alaska Native	732	88.2%
Asian	0	0.0%
Native Hawaiian and Other Pacific Islander	0	0.0%
Some other race	0	0.0%
Two or more races	34	4.1%
Hispanic or Latino (of any race)	3	0.4%

=== 2010 census ===
As of the 2010 United States census, there were 674 people living in the city. The racial makeup of the city was 87.8% Native American, 5.8% White, 0.4% Black, 0.1% from some other race and 3.9% from two or more races. 1.9% were Hispanic or Latino of any race.

=== 2000 census ===
As of the census of 2000, there were 757 people, 186 households, and 151 families living in the city. The population density was 119.4 inhabitants per square mile (46.1/km^{2}). There were 215 housing units at an average density of 33.9 per square mile (13.1/km^{2}). The racial makeup of the city was 8.72% White, 0.13% Black or African American, 87.05% Native American, 0.13% Asian, 0.13% from other races, and 3.83% from two or more races. 1.72% of the population were Hispanic or Latino of any race.

There were 186 households, out of which 54.8% had children under the age of 18 living with them, 50.0% were married couples living together, 19.4% had a female householder with no husband present, and 18.3% were non-families. 13.4% of all households were made up of individuals, and 2.2% had someone living alone who was 65 years of age or older. The average household size was 4.07 and the average family size was 4.50.

In the city, the age distribution of the population shows 42.5% under the age of 18, 11.6% from 18 to 24, 26.0% from 25 to 44, 14.7% from 45 to 64, and 5.2% who were 65 years of age or older. The median age was 22 years. For every 100 females, there were 122.6 males. For every 100 females age 18 and over, there were 118.6 males.

The median income for a household in the city was $63,125, and the median income for a family was $66,250. Males had a median income of $41,750 versus $35,625 for females. The per capita income for the city was $16,641. About 13.9% of families and 14.8% of the population were below the poverty line, including 17.3% of those under age 18 and 16.2% of those age 65 or over.

== Education ==
The North Slope Borough School District operates the Tikiġaq School in Point Hope.

== Health ==
Sale, importation, and possession of alcohol are banned in the village.

== Notable people ==
- John B. Driggs (1852–1914), physician who wrote Short Sketches of Oldest America (1905), a collection of stories and sketches of the Inupiat natives of Point Hope
- Caroline Cannon, awarded the Goldman Environmental Prize in 2012. In addition to her environmental activism, Cannon has served on Point Hope's city council on and off for many years, including serving as mayor from 1998 to 2001

== Gallery ==
Images from Point Hope

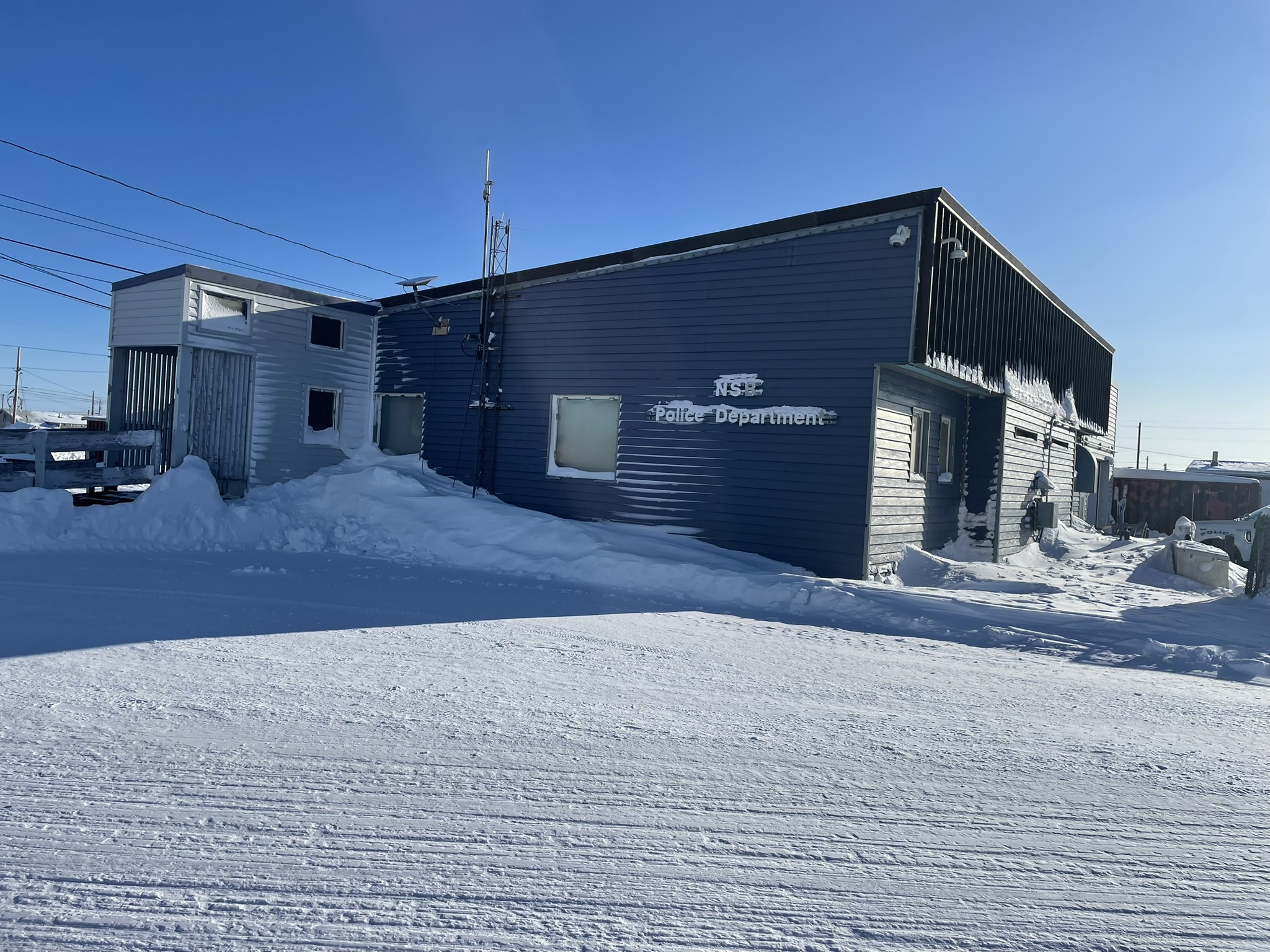
North Slope Borough Police Station in Point Hope, March 2025

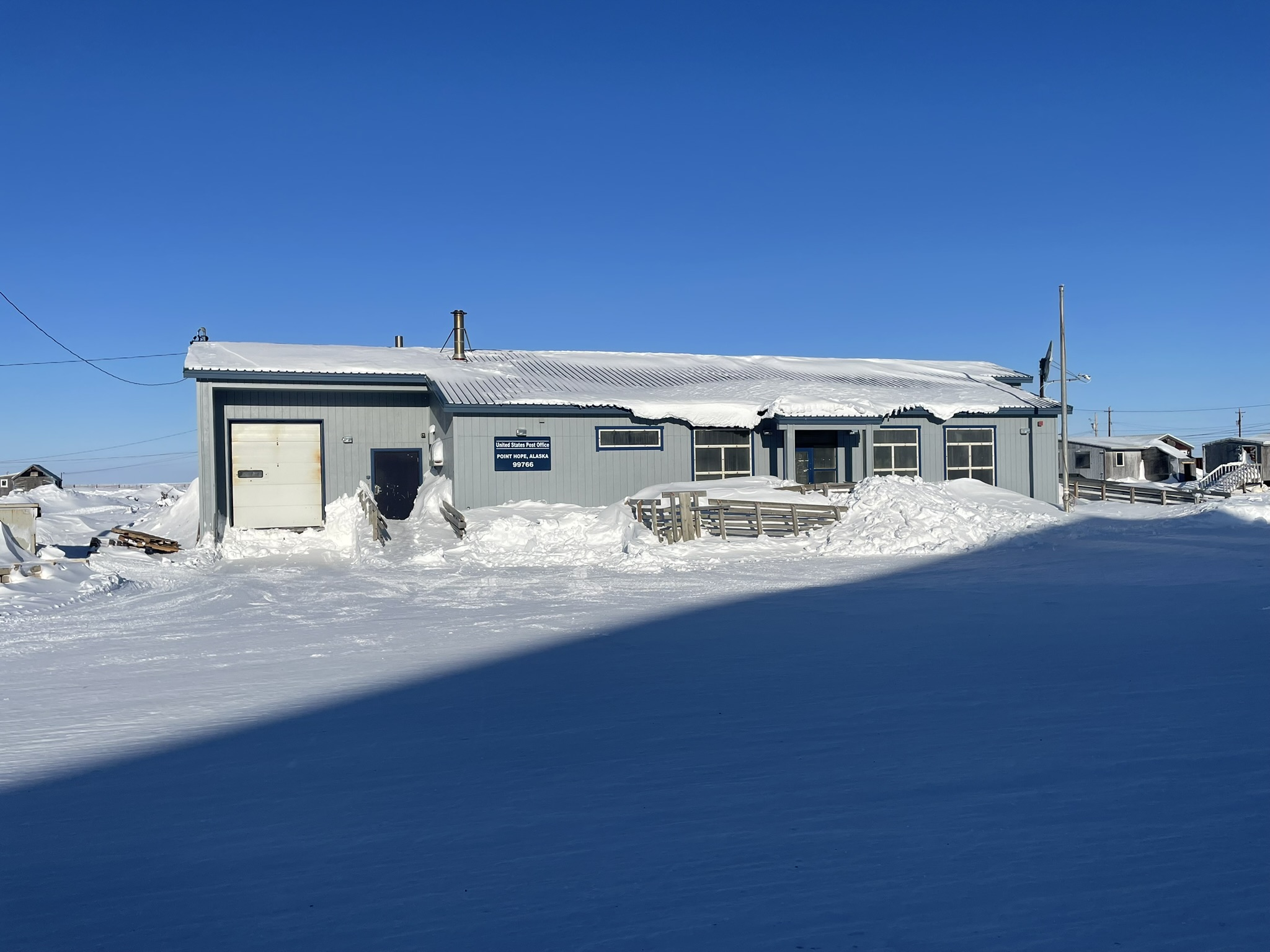
Point Hope's United States Post Office Building, March 2025

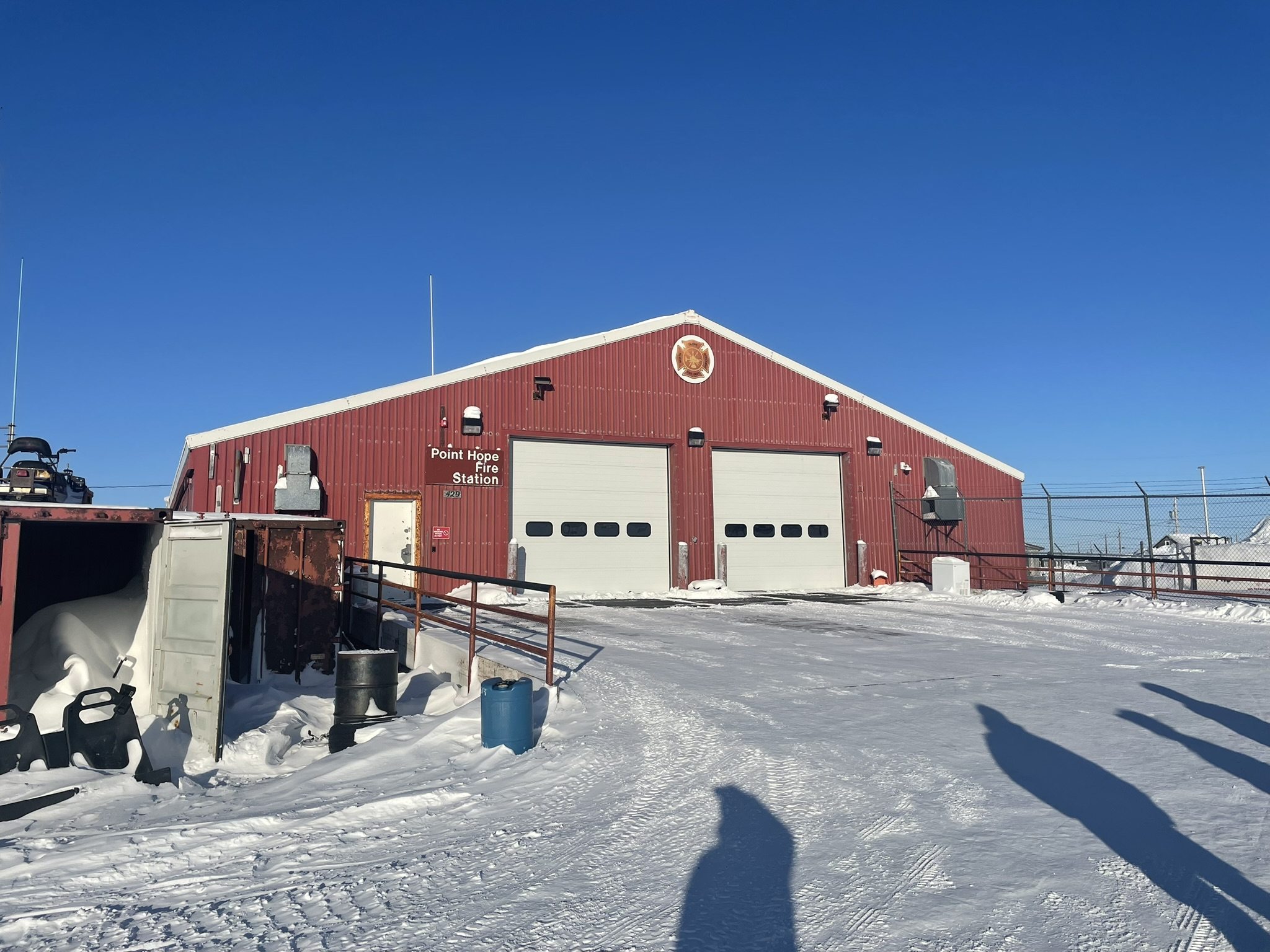
Point Hope's Fire Station, March 2025

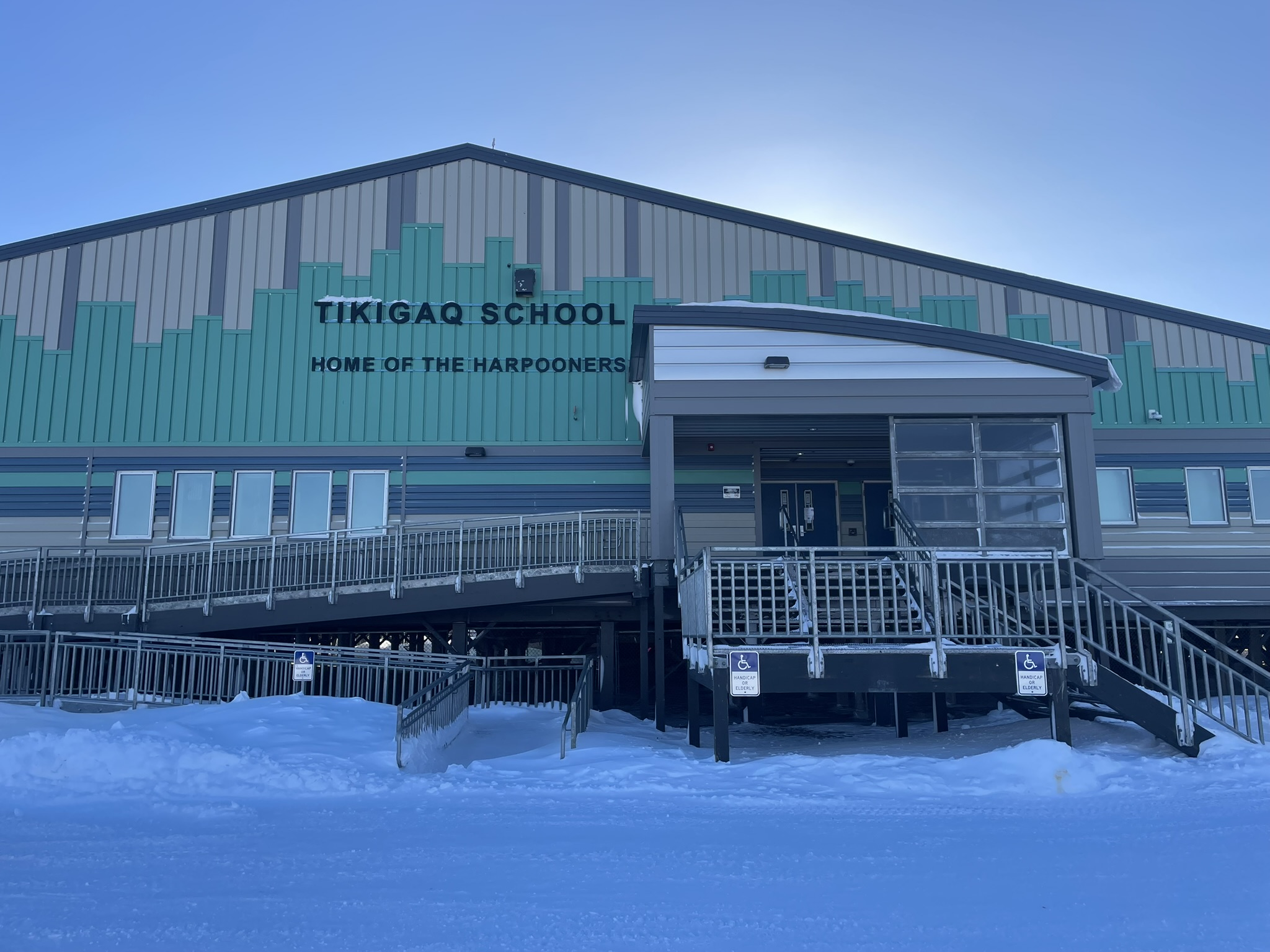
Point Hope Tikigaq School, March 2025

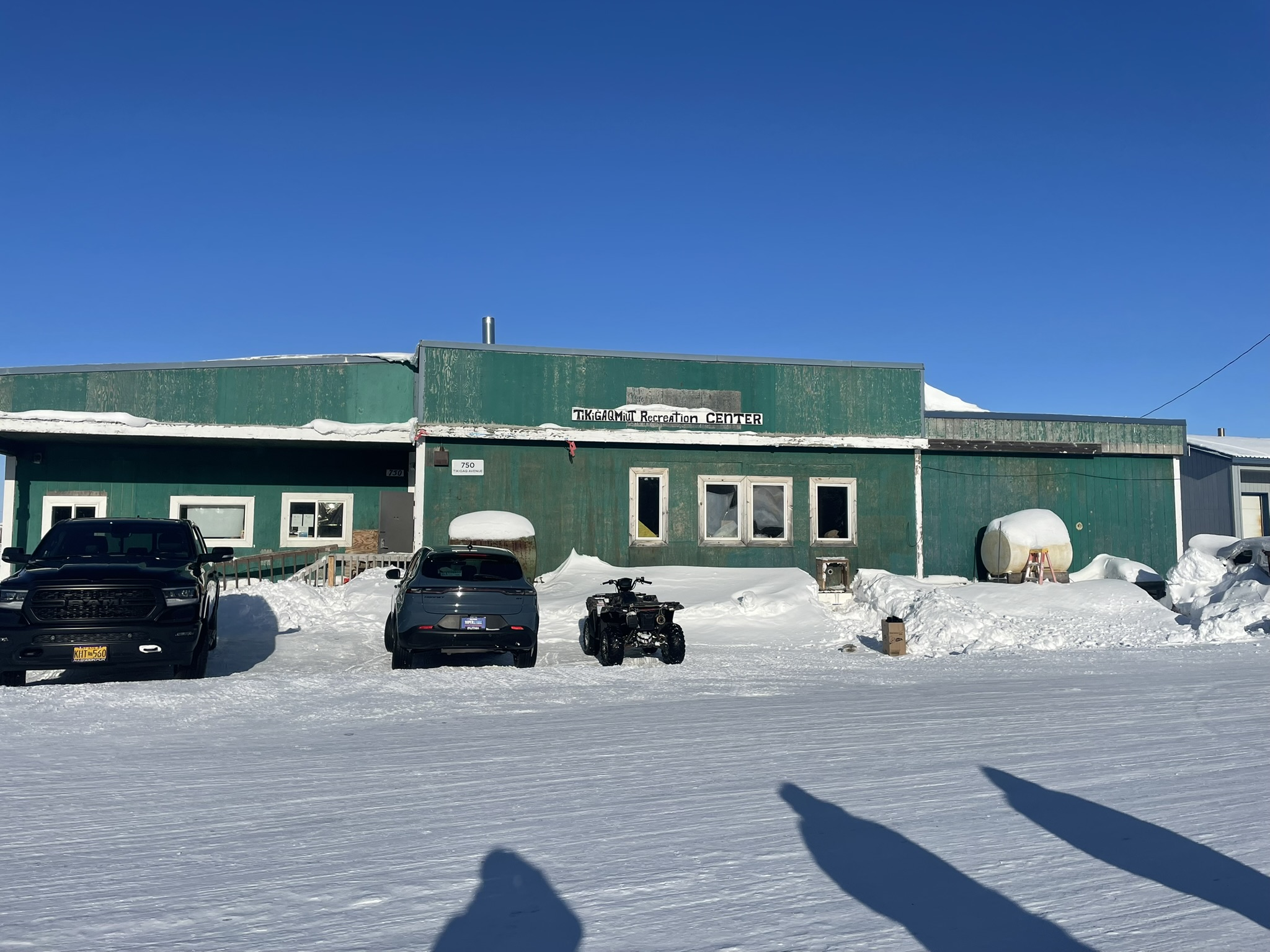
Tikigaqmiut Recreation Center, March 2025

== See also ==
- Point Hope (cape)
