= Rosson House =

Historic house in Arizona, United States

- Dr. Roland Lee Rosson House
- U.S. National Register of Historic Places
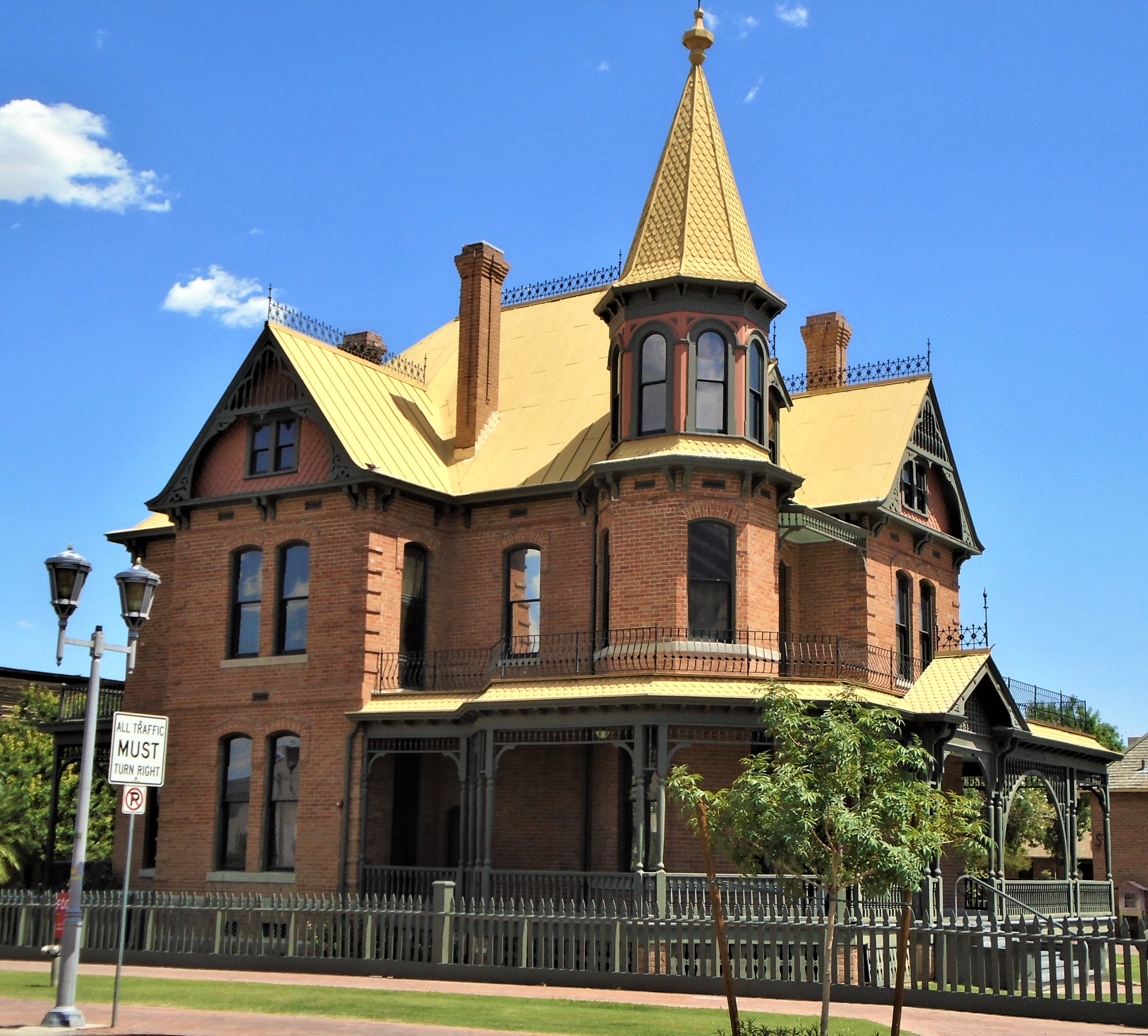
- (2021)

- Location within Arizona Location within the United States
- Interactive map showing the location of Rosson House
- Location: 113 North 6th Street, Phoenix, Arizona
- Coordinates: 33°27′0.72″N 112°3′57.6″W
- Built: 1895
- Architect: George Franklin Barber via A.P. Petit
- Architectural style: Stick-Eastlake Queen Anne Victorian
- NRHP reference No.: 71000112
- Added to NRHP: June 3, 1971

Rosson House, at 113 North 6th Street at the corner of Monroe Street in Downtown Phoenix, Arizona, is a historic house museum in Heritage Square. It was built between 1894 and 1895 in the Stick-Eastlake - Queen Anne Style of Victorian architecture and was designed by San Francisco architect A. P. Petit, his final design before his death. Named for Dr. Roland Lee Rosson and his wife Flora Murray Rosson, the house changed hands numerous times before being purchased by the City of Phoenix and restored to its original condition.

The house was added to the National Register of Historic Places in 1971.

== Architecture ==
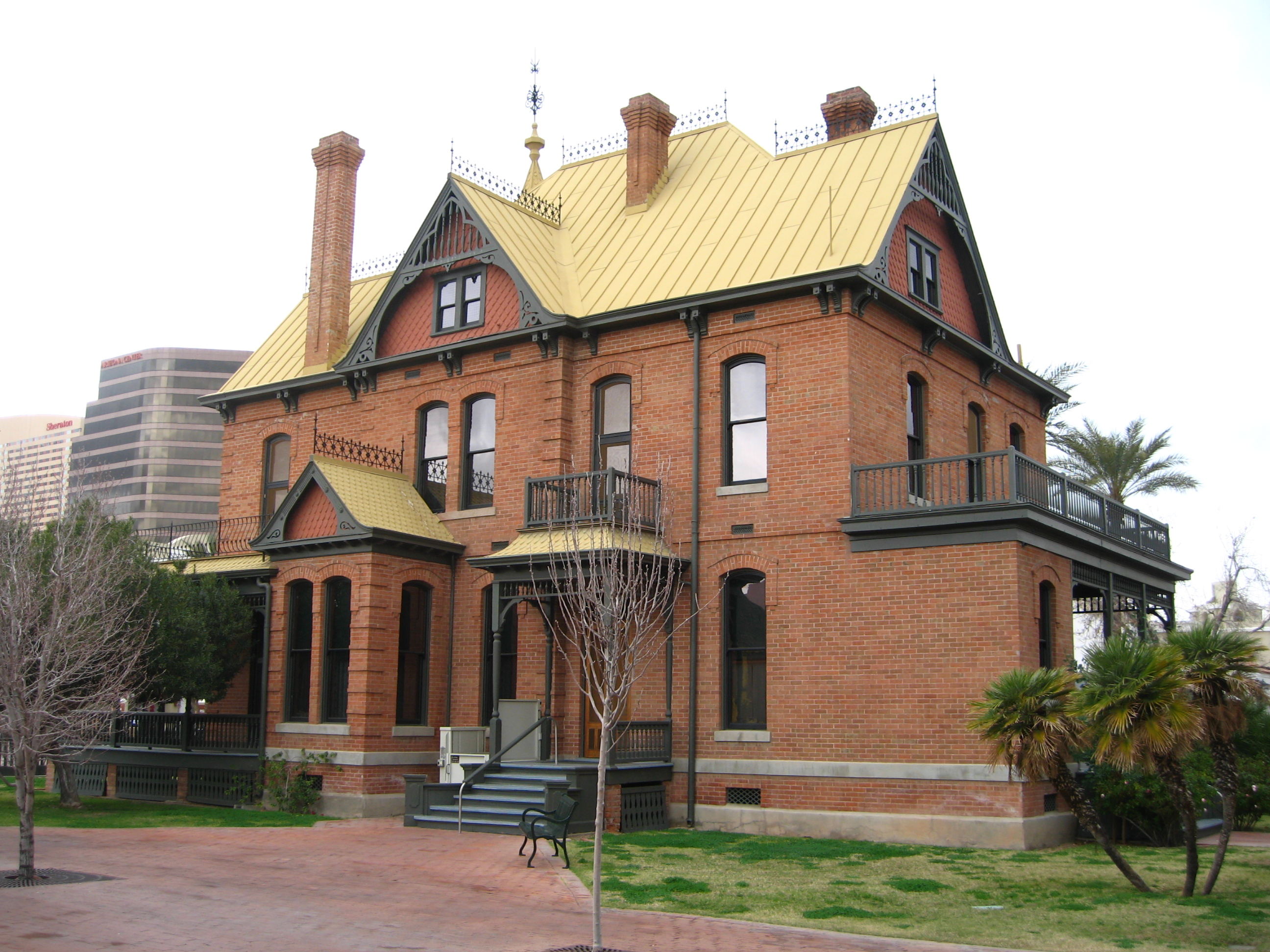
South elevation

This house is in the Stick-Eastlake Queen Anne Style of Victorian architecture. According to 19th century newspaper articles, it was designed by prominent San Francisco architect A. P. Petit. It would be his last house, as Petit died in the month of its completion. Controversy exists over the uniqueness of the design, since near exact plans for the house can be found in literature published prior, namely Design #1 as found in George Franklin Barber's Cottage Souvenir #2. The architecture displays numerous attributes contributed from different cultures, such as a Chinese moon gate, Italianate hooded windows, and a French octagonal turret.

== History ==
Dr. Roland Rosson came to Phoenix in 1879 where he established himself as a general physician and surgeon. Rosson practiced medicine on and off in Phoenix from 1879 until 1897. In addition to his career as a physician, Rosson was also involved in politics. In 1882 he was listed on the Democratic primary ticket. In 1884 he was elected Maricopa County coroner and public administrator. In 1890 he won the office of county treasurer. In 1892 he was elected for a second term and later unsuccessfully attempted to secure the Democratic nomination for sheriff. On May 7, 1895, Rosson was elected Mayor of Phoenix. He served as a Democrat in this unpaid position along with four Republican councilmen. Rosson's position as mayor was short lived. After difficulties with the city council, he resigned his office on April 6, 1896, before his term was over. Rosson appears to have stayed active in the political scene in Phoenix and his name appears in multiple issues of The Arizona Republic newspaper.

Roland Rosson married Flora B. Murray in Phoenix on August 11, 1880. The Rossons had a total of seven children – Irene, Vivien, Floy, Norma, and Clyde lived to adulthood. Their two other children died in infancy – their first son Roland Lloyd died at age five weeks, and an unnamed daughter died at birth.

In May 1882, Flora Rosson purchased Block 14 (now Heritage Square) in Phoenix, from Flora's half-sister, Margaret A. Richardson and her husband Mark P. Richardson for $1000. A newspaper article indicates that the Rossons spent $275 improving their residence in 1882, however the location of the residence is not noted. Prior to the construction of the Rosson House, it is likely that the Rossons lived on Block 14 in an adobe house. Sanborn maps indicate that the house was probably just south of the location of the new house.

In September 1894, several articles appeared in local papers requesting bids for a house designed by architect A. P. Petit for R.L. Rosson at the corner of Monroe and 6th Streets. Late in September, another article lists the bids on the house, including a bid of $7,525 from George E. Cisney who became the contractor for the house. By December a newspaper article indicates that the house was near completion.

In February 1895, an article in the Arizona Republic discussing the northeastern part of Phoenix notes that "The most expensive homes in the city – the Churchill, the Rosson, the Jacobs, the Murray and the Hine residences are in the immediate locality." March 16, 1895, is the first appearance of an ad for Dr. Rosson's office and residence listing the location as the corner of Monroe and Sixth streets.

The Rosson House was built with modern accommodations such as electric lights, hot and cold running water, an indoor upstairs bathroom, and a telephone. Other contemporary Victorian mansions on Monroe were similarly equipped – by 1892, Phoenix boasted electrical plants, a domestic water system, a gas system, and two competing telephone companies. The Phoenix street-car line ran down Monroe before turning north on Seventh Street, so the Rossons and other Monroe Street residents had only to walk out to board it.

The Rossons continued to own the home and the remainder of Block 14. However, during the winter of 1895-1896 and 1896–1897, the Rosson family rented their home to Whitelaw Reid, an influential Republican and head of the New York Tribune newspaper. No sources indicate where the Rosson family resided during that time. Reid had a lung condition and his doctors recommended he travel to Arizona for his health. The Reid family arrived at the Rosson House in November 1895, where he followed an open-air regimen. The Tribune was run from Phoenix by typed letters and telegraphs. Reid's letters are an excellent primary source about the early Rosson House and life in Phoenix at the time. He also wrote editorials for papers like the Los Angeles Herald in which he advertised the benefits of Arizona and Phoenix. In 1896, the Reids rented both the Rosson House and Jerry Millay's nearby house.

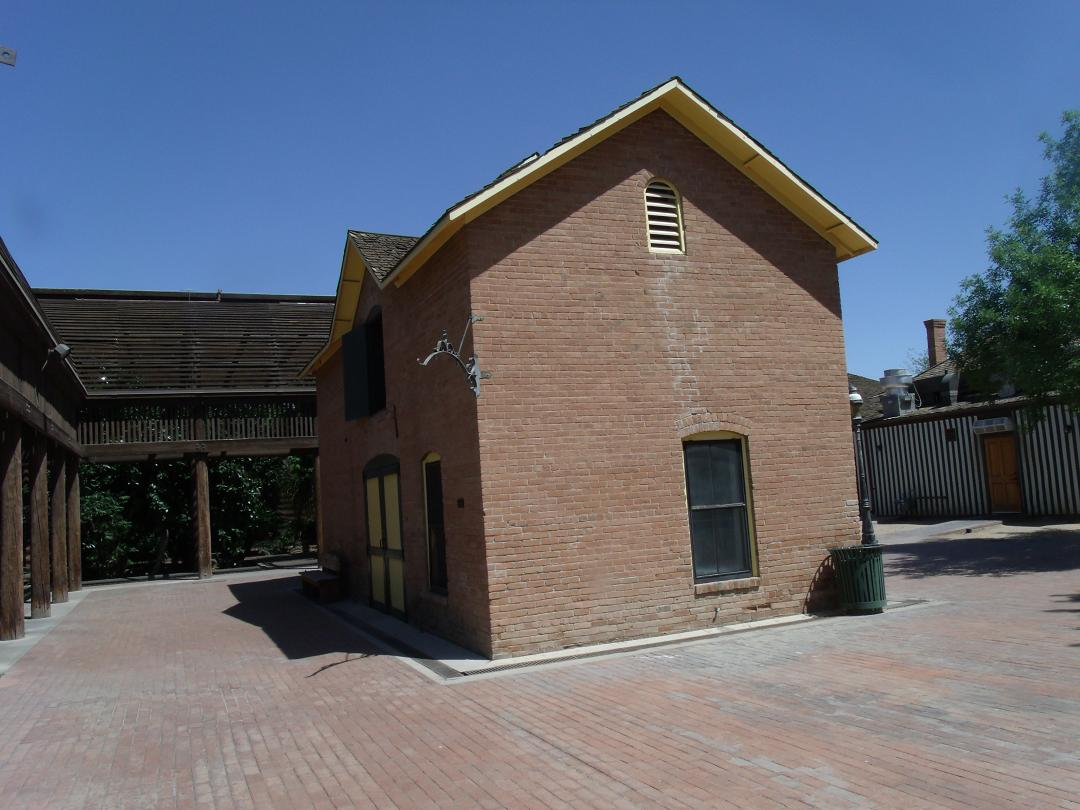
The Teeter Carriage House, built in 1899

In June 1897, the Rossons sold their house and the north half of Block 14. The family moved to Los Angeles, California by July 27, 1897. The exact reasons for their move are unknown. Newspaper accounts suggest that the Rossons may have had financial difficulties. According to delinquent tax records listed in the newspapers in 1896 and 1897, both Roland and Flora owed back taxes. Renting their newly constructed house to Whitelaw Reid also suggests that the Rossons needed additional income. The family may also have moved for other reasons. Rosson's obituary in 1898 states that "…he removed with his family to Los Angeles on account of the educational advantages."

Little is known about Dr. Rosson's brief time in Los Angeles. On May 12, 1898, after an illness of several weeks, Dr. Rosson died. Initially, his death was considered suspicious and possibly a suicide. Shortly before his death, Rosson had purchased life insurance from several different companies. An autopsy and subsequent coroner's jury in Los Angeles ruled the death to be a result of gastroenteritis. Little else is known of Flora's life. She died in Los Angeles from "tubercular laryngitis" at age fifty-two on September 9, 1911. Her death certificate listed her occupation as "household duties."

== Other owners ==
On June 3, 1897, Aaron Goldberg and his wife, Carrie, purchased the house and north half of Block 14 from the Rossons for $10,000. Aaron and Carrie Goldberg were a prominent Jewish couple in Phoenix. Aaron co-owned Goldberg's clothing store and was also engaged in political and civic activities. A member of the 19th and 20th Territorial Legislature, Goldberg wrote the bill that permanently located the capitol in Phoenix. He also served on the Phoenix City Council, the Board of Trade, and the Capitol Commission.The Goldberg children included Hazel, Selma and Chester (Chet), who, according to his obituary, was born in the Rosson House.

On September 7, 1904, the Goldbergs sold the house and property to "S. W." Higley. Steven W. Higley started out as a railroad builder, became a land owner and later was a partner in the Arizona Republic newspaper. Higley lived in the Rosson House with wife Jessie Freemont Howe, sons Thomas and James, as well as his daughter Jessie Jean. Later, both Thomas and James served in World War I. James died on the battlefield and Thomas returned home and went on to open Tom's Tavern in Phoenix. Jessie Jean went on to marry E. B. Lane. Much of the information known about the Higley family comes from several interviews conducted with daughter Jessie Jean Lane in the 1970s.

The Higleys sold the Rosson House and portions of the larger lot to the Gammel family on August 22, 1914. The Gammel family owned and lived in the Rosson House longer than any other family. Earlier, William Gammel had been a gambler in Jerome, Arizona. In 1904, he married Francis Christopher, a Hispanic woman from Tucson. The couple had 3 daughters – Annie (b. 1906), Wilma (b. 1908), and Atlanta Georgia (b.1909). Gammel was a co-owner of the Capitol Saloon at 28–30 E. Washington. Shortly after buying the Rosson House, Prohibition became law in Arizona and it hurt Gammel's business. In the 1916 Phoenix City Directory, his business was called the Capitol Buffet and sold soft drinks. In 1919, Gammel was listed as an orange grower, and two years later, the Phoenix City Directory said Mrs. Frankie Gammel had furnished rooms available (in the Rosson House).

The Gammel family lived in the Rosson House until 1948 and ran a rooming/boarding house. To make the house better for renters, the Gammels made drastic changes to the house including walling in porches, subdividing floors and adding multiple kitchens and bathrooms. After 1948, the Rosson House changed hands multiple times and continued to operate as a rooming house, eventually becoming a "flop house" and falling into disrepair.

At the urging of Mayor John D. Driggs, the City of Phoenix purchased the Rosson House and the remainder of Block 14 in 1974. The Rosson House was restored through a community effort involving the City of Phoenix, dozens of local institutions and hundreds of volunteers.

== Other brick landmarks ==
The Rosson House is an early example, though not the first, of a house in Phoenix constructed of fired brick and wood instead of adobe bricks. Brick was Petit's preferred building material. At least one local brick-making factory had previously been established, and some fine examples of early brick houses that predate the Rosson House include the mansion built in 1887 for John T. Dennis at 242 E. Monroe and its neighbor at 230 E. Monroe built for M. Jacobs. The John T. Dennis mansion was demolished in the 1950s. Additionally, there was the large house built for Columbus Gray in 1890, and the J.Y.T. Smith House at 5th St. and Adams reportedly dates from 1892. Almost all of the early hotels of Phoenix were made out of locally produced red bricks as well.

A number of smaller homes were built outside the city limits in the 1880s by J.J. Welty, and made out of poured concrete blocks made to look like hewn stone. There is also the mansion built by John T. Dennis' neighbor Clark Churchill which later became the first home of Phoenix Union High School.

== Access ==
Heritage Square Foundation and Guild operates the restored Rosson House as a historic house museum in the city of Phoenix Heritage and Science Park and offers public tours.

== See also ==
- Heritage Square, Phoenix
