= Western Savings and Loan =

Financial institution in Arizona (1929–1990)

- Type: Private
- Industry: Savings and loan association
- Founded: 1929; 97 years ago in Phoenix, Arizona
- Defunct: June 1, 1990; 36 years ago
- Fate: Insolvency
- Successor: Bank of America Arizona (and later Bank of America)
- Headquarters: Phoenix, Arizona, United States
- Area served: Arizona, Utah
- Key people: Junius Driggs, CEO; Douglas Driggs
- Revenue: 6 billion USD

Western Savings and Loan was an American financial institution founded by the Driggs family.

The Driggs family came to Arizona in 1921 after trading everything they owned—a bank, drugstore, hotel, and wheat farm in Driggs, Idaho—for a section of cotton land in Maricopa County. Their timing was unfortunate as cotton prices plummeted just as their crop came in and they were forced to take jobs selling building and loan certificates. In 1929, the Driggs family pooled $5,000 to found the Western Building and Loan Association, which became Western Savings.

== Success and eventual failure ==
Western Savings and Loan eventually became a $6 billion savings and loan institution. Western shared a position on the list of the nation's 100 largest savings and loans with other Arizona-based institutions – MeraBank was number 27 on the list, Western came in at 37th, Great American was 67th, and Pima was 82nd. But in 1989, Western Savings moved into second place – not for its size, but for the amount of its losses, with a $1.06 billion net deficit, following a substantial but smaller loss the previous year. Western Savings was taken over by the Resolution Trust Corporation, the federal depositor for the savings and loan crisis bailout in June 1989. In June 1990, Bank of America paid the Resolution Trust Corporation $81 million for Western Savings' $3.5 billion in deposits in 60 branches in Arizona and one branch in Salt Lake City, Utah, and converted the thrift into commercial bank called Bank of America Arizona. In 1995, President Gary Driggs pleaded guilty to two felony charges and was fined $10,000 and placed on probation for five years.

== Accomplishments and recognition ==
American Newcomen honored Western Savings and Loan Association in the year of the company's 40th anniversary. Since it was formed by the Driggs family in the spring of 1929, six months before the historic stock crash, Western Savings had grown by 1969 to become the largest savings and loan association in Arizona and among the 100 largest in the United States. The major objectives of the association were the encouragement of thrift and the promotion of home ownership. Over those years, more than 30,000 first mortgage loans had been made, totaling more than 390 million dollars, thus becoming a significant factor in the growth and development of Arizona.
