= John B. Driggs =

American physician (1852–1914)

John Beach Driggs (December 13, 1852 – September 21, 1914) was a medical doctor and teacher sent to work at the mission station of the Episcopal Church in Northwestern Alaska, at Tig-a-ra (Tikiġaq, in Point Hope, Alaska) in the summer of 1890. Driggs remained in Point Hope until at least 1910, and he recorded short stories depicting the nature, traditions and legends of the In-u-pash (Inupiat) natives, most likely the Tikiġaġmiut. These stories were published as Short Sketches of Oldest America in 1905.

John Beach Driggs, the youngest of four children, was born in the Caribbean to parents Samuel Butler Driggs and Mary Eysing. His father had been born in the West Indies and most likely had worked the principal part of his life as a planter. Samuel and his brother Joseph came to the United States about 1870 and settled in western Pennsylvania. Joseph soon returned to the West Indies, and Samuel moved to Delaware. He sent his children, including John, from Cuba to New Haven, Connecticut, with their mother, to be educated. He father sold his plantation in Cuba and then returned Delaware.

Driggs studied medicine at the University Medical College at the University of the City of New York (now known as New York University) and graduated in 1880, receiving the degree of M.D. He practiced medicine at 243 E. 58th St., from 1880 to 1883 and at 1062 Second Ave., from 1884 to 1888, according to Polk's Directory of Physicians and Surgeons. In 1890, his address was given as Dover, Kent County, Delaware. His latest address, as furnished by the university and Bellevue Hospital Medical College, is Point Hope, Alaska; but his name does not appear in Polk's Directory of physicians of Alaska for any year since 1890. Episcopal Missionary, Point Hope, Alaska from 1890 to 1910.
