= Tikiġaġmiut =

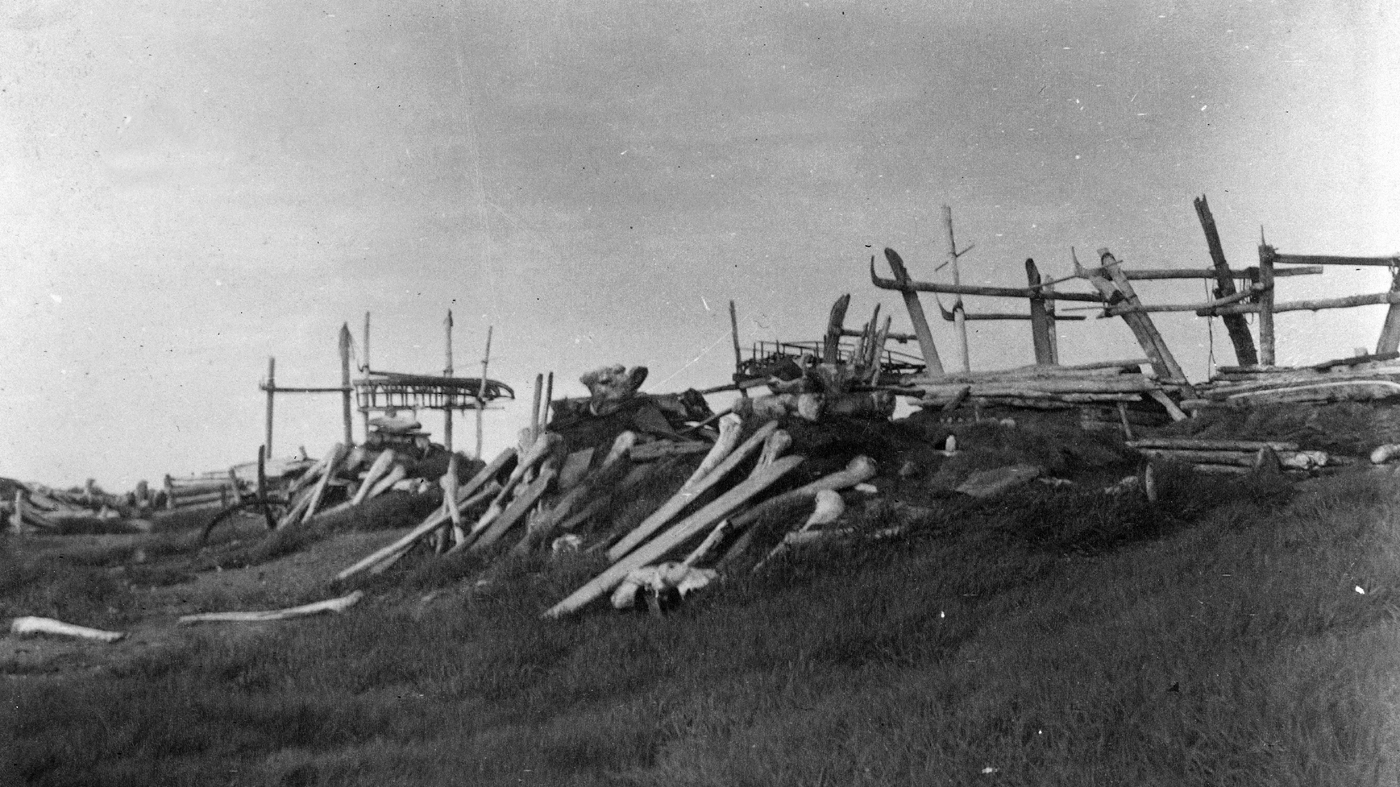
Semi-underground men's community house (Qargi) with bowhead whale bones, Point Hope, Alaska, 1885

The Tikiġaġmiut (Inupiaq: [tikeʁɑɴmiut]), an Iñupiat people, live two hundred miles north of the Arctic Circle, 330 mi (530 km) southwest of Utqiagvik, Alaska, in the village of Point Hope (Inupiaq: Tikiġaq). The Tikigaq are the oldest continuously settled Native American site on the continent. They are Native whale hunters with centuries of experience co-existing with the Chukchi Sea that surrounds the Point Hope cape on three sides. "Tikiġaq" means "resembles an index finger (point of land)" in the Iñupiaq language.

== History ==
About 1,500 years ago, when Tikiġaġmiut first settled the Point Hope area, they did not depend on whale hunting. Instead, early Tikiġaġmiut were notable for producing elaborate and beautiful art in an artstyle called Ipiutak, after the place where archaeologists first found the artwork. But the Tikagaq's past is a present-day mystery with no explanation for where the ideas for the art came from, nor how a large population was sustained during their earliest centuries without whale dependence.

The Tikigaq relied on berries and roots for food, local willows for house frames, and moss or grass for lamp wicks and insulation.

Today, distribution and movement of game, especially the beluga, bowhead whale, caribou, seal, walrus, fur-bearing animals, polar bear and grizzly bear, directly affect the lives of Tikigaq.

== Daily life ==
While ancillary health care is provided by the local volunteer fire department, the closest physician is in Kotzebue, Alaska, 180 mi (290 km) away.

About one in three Tikiġaġmiut homes lack running water or sewer connections.

== Culture ==
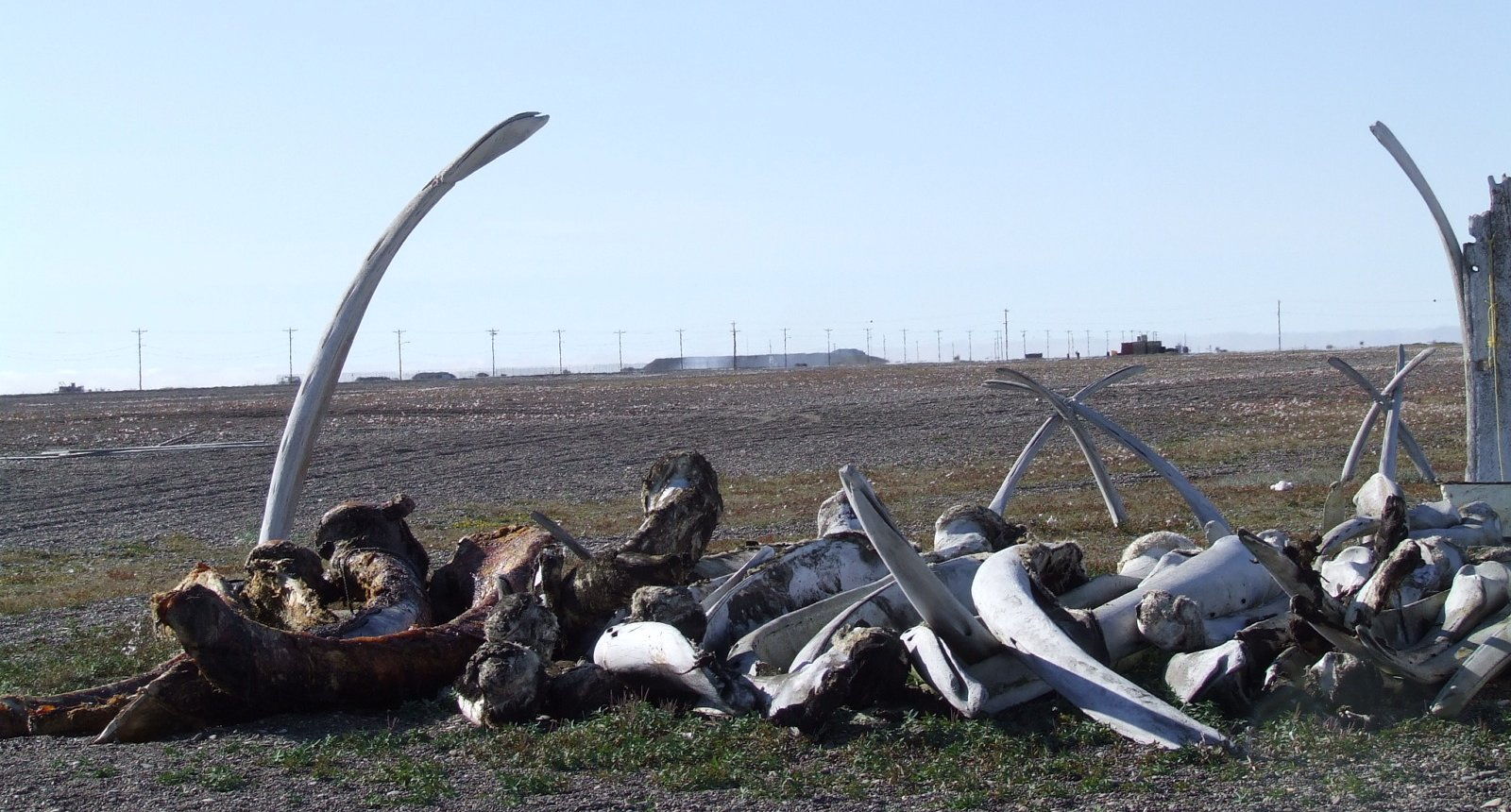
Whale bones at ceremonial site

Also known as Tikigaqmuit or Tikigaqmiut, the Tikiġaġmiut people used to live close together for half the year in underground whale-bone, driftwood, and dirt houses that were connected by tunnels. The men's unit was called the qargi. Tikigaqmiut today live in modern houses. Their connections include the spirits of ancestors, the sun, the moon, and animal worship. Tikiġaġmiut sustain myths about their homeland once being a great whale killed by a shaman's harpoon. Their year involves storytelling, rituals, dances, shamanic seances, puppet shows, divinations, spirit guests, encounters with animal souls, and lunar rites, culminating in the spring with the annual whale hunt.

Tikiġaġmiut people have complex kinship and alliance webs.

== Education ==
Tikigaq School, part of the North Slope Borough School District, is the second largest K-12 in Alaska, serving more than 250 children. Notable to the school's curriculum is a three-week whaling class where a small group of students learn specific whaling traditions and skills.
