= Point Hope (cape) =

Cape in northwest Alaska, United States

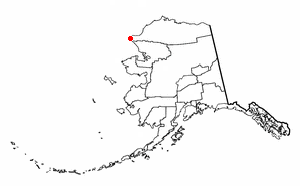

Point Hope (Iñupiaq: Tikiġaq) is a headland in the U.S. state of Alaska, located at the western tip of the Lisburne Peninsula. It lies on the Chukchi Sea coast, 40 miles southwest of Cape Lisburne, Arctic Slope at 68°20′27″N 166°50′00″W (68.347052, -166.762917). The city of Point Hope is located on the foreland.

The Inuit name for this cape was Tikarakh or Tikiġaq commonly spelled "Tiagara," meaning "forefinger".

The first recorded Europeans to sight this cape were Russian explorers Mikhail Vasiliev and Gleb Shishmaryov of the Imperial Russian Navy on the ships Otkrietie and Blagonamierennie. Vasiliev and Shishmaryov named the headland Mys Golovnina, after Vice Admiral Vasily Golovnin (1776–1831).

This cape was later renamed by Captain Frederick William Beechey of the Royal Navy, who wrote on August 2, 1826: "I named it Point Hope in compliment to Sir William Johnstone Hope". According to Archdeacon Stuck Sir William Hope hailed from a "well-known house long connected with the sea".
