= John D. Driggs =

American politician (1927–2014)

50th Mayor of Phoenix
- In office January 2, 1970 – January 2, 1974
- Preceded by: Milton H. Graham
- Succeeded by: Timothy A. Barrow

Personal details
- Born: June 16, 1927 Douglas, Arizona, U.S.
- Died: December 11, 2014 (aged 87) Phoenix, Arizona, U.S.
- Children: 5, including Adam
- Education: Stanford University (MBA)
- Occupation: Chairman, Western Savings and Loan

John Douglas Driggs (June 16, 1927 – December 11, 2014) was an American politician. He served as mayor of Phoenix, Arizona from 1970 to 1974.

== Biography ==
He was an alumnus of Stanford University, where he earned an MBA degree. He then worked for Western Savings. Driggs was married to Gail and had five sons, 19 grandchildren and seven great grandchildren.

== See also ==
- Driggs family
