= Chefornak Airport =

Airport in Alaska, United States

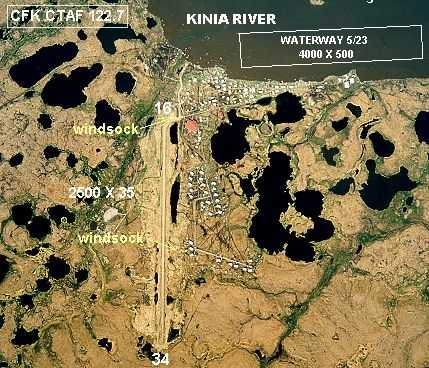
- IATA: CYF; ICAO: PACK; FAA LID: CFK

Summary
- Airport type: Public
- Owner: State of Alaska DOT&PF
- Serves: Chefornak, Alaska
- Elevation AMSL: 40 ft (12 m)
- Coordinates: 60°08′57″N 164°17′08″W

Map
- Location of airport in Alaska

Runways
Direction	Length		Surface
Direction	ft	m	Surface
16/34	3,230	985	Gravel

Statistics (2015)
- Aircraft operations: 4,150 (2012)
- Based aircraft: 0
- Passengers: 9,013
- Freight: 983,000 lbs
- Source: Federal Aviation Administration

Chefornak Airport (IATA: CYF, ICAO: PACK, FAA LID: CFK) is a state-owned public-use airport in Chefornak, a city in the Bethel Census Area of the U.S. state of Alaska. The airport is on the Kinia River.

Most U.S. airports use the same three-letter location identifier for the FAA and IATA, but this airport is assigned CFK by the FAA and CYF by the IATA. The airport's ICAO identifier is PACK.

== Facilities ==
Chefornak Airport has one runway designated 16/34 with a gravel and dirt surface measuring 2,500 by 28 feet (762 x 9 m).

A new airstrip has been built further out from the village due to concerns with the current airstrip being near the school and pedestrian traffic but however, the runway must settle for several years before it is ready to be used.

== Airlines and destinations ==
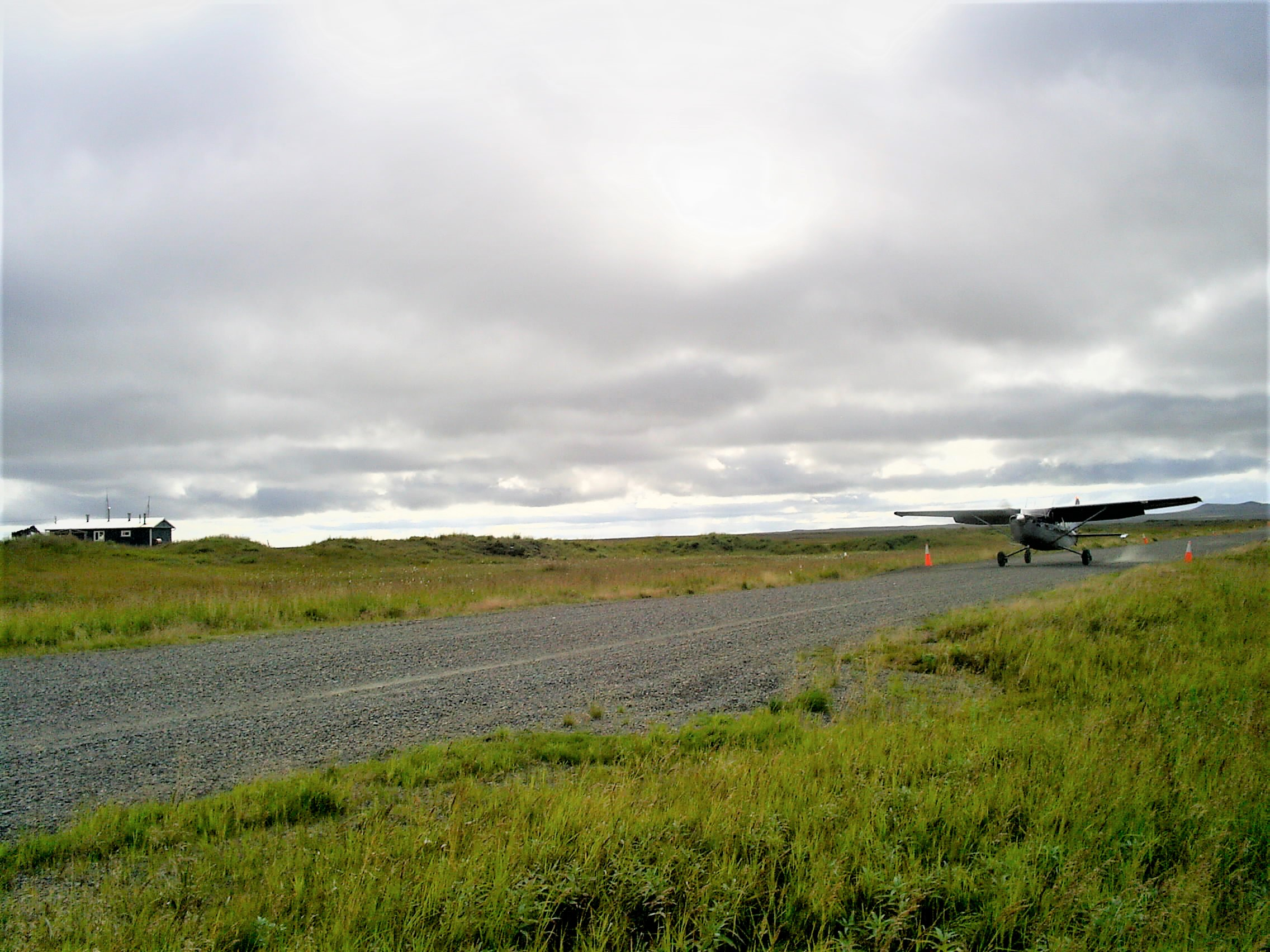
Plane landing at CYF

Airlines	Destinations
Grant Aviation	Bethel
Yute Commuter Service	Bethel, Kipnuk

=== Statistics ===
Carrier shares: January – December 2015
Carrier	Passengers (arriving and departing)
Hageland	5,320(55.45%)
Yute Air	2,950(30.74%)
Grant	1,330(13.81%)

Top domestic destinations: January – December 2015
Rank	City	Airport	Passengers
1	(Alaska) Bethel, AK	Bethel Airport	3,190
2	(Alaska) Toksook Bay, AK	Toksook Bay Airport	670
3	(Alaska) Kipnuk, AK	Kipnuk Airport	260
4	(Alaska) Nightmute, AK	Nightmute Airport	260
5	(Alaska) Tununak, AK	Tununak Airport	100
6	(Alaska) Kwigillingok, AK	Kwigillingok Airport	100
7	(Alaska) Tuntutuliak, AK	Tuntutuliak Airport	70
8	(Alaska) Newtok, AK	Newtok Airport	60
9	(Alaska) Kongiganak, AK	Kongiganak Airport	20
10	(Alaska) Nunapitchuk, AK	Nunapitchuk Airport	20

== See also ==
- List of airports in Alaska
