= Atmautluak Airport =

Atmautluak Airport (Also known as "Thomas M. Cook Atmautluak International Airport)
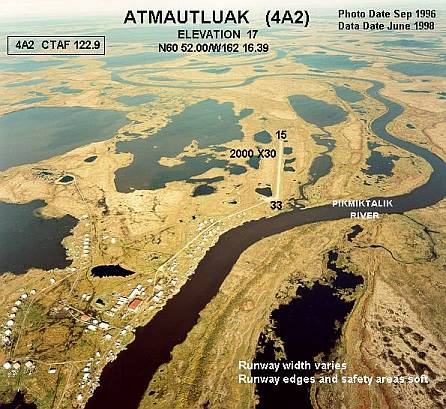
- IATA: ATT; ICAO: PAAB; FAA LID: 4A2

Summary
- Airport type: Public
- Owner: Alaska DOT&PF - Central Region
- Serves: Atmautluak, Alaska
- Elevation AMSL: 17 ft (5.2 m)
- Coordinates: 60°52′00″N 162°16′23″W

Map
- Location of airport in Alaska

Runways
Direction	Length		Surface
Direction	ft	m	Surface
15/33	3,000	914	Gravel

Statistics (2015)
- Aircraft operations: 0 (2014)
- Based aircraft: 0
- Passengers: 4,763
- Freight: 463,000 lbs
- Source: FAA

Atmautluak Airport (IATA: ATT, ICAO: PAAB, FAA LID: 4A2) is a state-owned public-use airport located in Atmautluak, in the Bethel Census Area of the U.S. state of Alaska.

As per Federal Aviation Administration records, this airport had 2,613 passenger boardings (enplanements) in calendar year 2007, an increase of 29% from the 2,018 enplanements in 2006.

== Facilities ==
Atmautluak Airport has one runway designated 15/33 with a 3,000 by 75 ft (914 x 23 m) gravel surface. The runway was previously 2,000 by 30 ft until it was expanded by the state.

== Airlines and destinations ==
Airlines	Destinations
Grant Aviation	Bethel, Nunapitchuk, Kasigluk
Ryan Air	Marshall, St. Mary's
Yute Commuter Service	Bethel, Kasigluk, Nunapitchuk

=== Statistics ===
Carrier shares: November 2022 - October 2023
Carrier	Passengers (arriving and departing)
Grant	2,090(54.95%)
Paklook	1,710(44.97%)
Ryan Air Services	3(0.08%)

Top domestic destinations: November 2022 - October 2023
Rank	City	Airport	Passengers
1	Bethel	Bethel Airport (BET)	1,760
2	Kasigluk	Kasigluk Airport (KUK)	120
3	Nunapitchuk	Nunapitchuk (NUP)	120
4	Napakiak	Napakiak Airport (WNA)	10
5	Pilot Station	Pilot Station Airport (PQS)	<10
6	St. Mary's	St. Mary's Airport (KSM)	<10
7	Napaskiak	Napaskiak Airport (PKA)	<10
8	Kwethluk	Kwethluk Airport (KWT)	<10

== See also ==
- List of airports in Alaska
