= Flight Alaska =

Alaskan airline (1956–2017)

Yute Air
| IATA | ICAO | Call sign |
|---|---|---|
| 4Y | TUD | TUNDRA |
- Founded: 1956; 70 years ago as Bob Harris Flying Services
- Ceased operations: 2017; 9 years ago (assets assumed by Ravn Alaska)
- Hubs: Bethel, Alaska, United States
- Fleet size: 14
- Destinations: 22
- Parent company: Flight Alaska Inc.
- Headquarters: Anchorage, Alaska
- Key people: Tim Votis
- Website: http://www.yuteair.net/

Flight Alaska (d/b/a Yute Air) was an American airline based in Bethel, Alaska, United States. It operated scheduled services to over 22 villages in Alaska and also provided charter services throughout Alaska. Its main base was Bethel Airport. The air carrier announced abruptly that it was ceasing operations on March 5, 2017, effective immediately, with Ravn Alaska purchasing the tangible owned assets of Yute Air and replacing Yute Air on its former routes. The company slogan was Wings of the People.

== History ==
The airline, established by Phillip and Demptha Bingman, began flying from Dillingham, Alaska in 1956 as Bob Harris Flying Services. It was renamed in 1974 as Yute Air Alaska, translating to "the people" in Yupik. Yute Air was sold to William Johnson in 1988. After 11 years, in 1999 he filed for bankruptcy. The company and operating certificate were then acquired by the Flight International Group in April 2000 and shortly thereafter renamed "Flight Alaska". Under the Flight Alaska name, it operated with a multitude of aircraft in addition to the original Cessna 207 aircraft, including a Lear 35, King Air 200, and four CASA 212-200's. Operations included bypass mail, scheduled passenger and freight service, lodge and private charters, and government smokejumping contracts. Yute Air was then acquired by Tim Vottis, in 2004. The airline was downsized to only hub out of Bethel Airport, AK and only serve the surrounding area. The name reverted to Yute Air, which it used until going out of business in 2017.

The company was succeeded by Yute Commuter Service in 2017.

== Destinations ==
Yute Air operated services to the following domestic scheduled destinations (at June 2012): Bethel, Chefornak, Eek, Goodnews Bay, Kipnuk, Kongiganak, Kwigillingok, Newtok, Nightmute, Platinum, Quinhagak, Toksook Bay, Tuntutuliak and Tununak, Atmautluak, Nunapitchuk, Kasigluk, Kwethluk, Akiachak, Akiak, Tuluksak, Kalskag and others.

== Fleet ==
At the time of closure, Yute Air's fleet consisted of two Cessna 172 and twelve Cessna 207 aircraft, all sold to Ravn Alaska upon closure.

== See also ==
- List of defunct airlines of the United States
