= Chevak Airport =

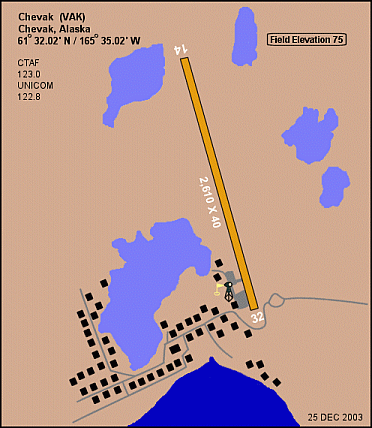
- IATA: VAK; ICAO: PAVA; FAA LID: VAK

Summary
- Airport type: Public
- Owner: State of Alaska DOT&PF - Central Region
- Location: Chevak, Alaska
- Elevation AMSL: 75 ft (23 m)
- Coordinates: 61°32′27″N 165°36′03″W

Map
- Location of airport in Alaska

Runways
Direction	Length		Surface
Direction	ft	m	Surface
2/20	3,220	981	Gravel

Statistics (2015)
- Based aircraft: 0
- Passengers: 12,115
- Freight: 1,912,000 lbs
- Source: Federal Aviation Administration

Chevak Airport (IATA: VAK, ICAO: PAVA, FAA LID: VAK) is a publicly owned airport located one mile (1.6 km) north of the central business district of Chevak, a city in the Kusilvak Census Area of the U.S. state of Alaska. The airport is owned by the state.

== Facilities ==
Chevak Airport has one runway and one seaplane landing area:

- Runway 14/32: 2,680 x 50 ft. (817 x 15 m), surface: gravel
- Runway 18W/36W: 2,000 x 400 ft. (610 x 122 m), surface: water

Dimension:	3200 x 75 ft / 975.4 x 22.9 m
Surface:	GRVL, Fair Condition RY USED AS ROAD. FIRST 200 FT OF RY02 ROUGH.
Edge Lights:	Medium

	Runway 02	Runway 20
Longitude:	165-36-21.2000W	165-35-45.2212W
Latitude:	61-32-13.8312N	61-32-40.2536N
Elevation:	35.00 ft	47.00 ft
Alignment:	33	127
Traffic Pattern:	Left	Left
Crossing Height:	25.00 ft	25.00 ft
VASI:	4-light PAPI on left side	4-light PAPI on left side
Visual Glide Angle:	3.00°	3.00°
Runway End Identifier:	Yes	Yes

=== Runway 18W/36W ===
Dimension:	2000 x 400 ft / 609.6 x 121.9 m
Surface:	WATER, RY USED AS ROAD. FIRST 200 FT OF RY02 ROUGH.

	Runway 18W	Runway 36W
Traffic Pattern:	Left	Left

== Radio Navigation Aids ==
ID	Type	Name	Ch	Freq	Var	Dist
CZF	NDB/DME	Cape Romanzof	114Y	275.00	13E	18.3 nm
HPB	VOR/DME	Hooper Bay	099X	115.20	13E	15.4 nm

== Airlines and destinations ==
Airlines	Destinations
Grant Aviation	Bethel
Ryan Air	Bethel, Hooper Bay, Scammon Bay

=== Statistics ===
Carrier shares: January – December 2015
Carrier	Passengers (arriving and departing)
Hageland	8,140(67.22%)
Grant	3,970(32.78%)

Top domestic destinations: January – December 2015 === Top destinations ===
Rank	City	Airport	Passengers	Carriers
1	(Alaska) Bethel, AK	Bethel Airport	4,870	Grant, Hageland
2	(Alaska) Hooper Bay, AK	Hooper Bay Airport	780	Grant
3	(Alaska) Scammon Bay, AK	Scammon Bay Airport	190	
4	(Alaska) Newtok, AK	Newtok Airport	70	
5	(Alaska) St. Mary's, AK	St. Mary's Airport	50	
6	(Alaska) Chefornak, AK	Chefornak Airport	10	
	(Alaska) Platinum, AK	Platinum Airport	10	
	(Alaska) Emmonak, AK	Emmonak Airport	10	
	(Alaska) Unalakleet, AK	Unalakleet Airport	10	
	(Alaska) Eek, AK	Eek Airport	10	

== See also ==
- List of airports in Alaska
