= Eek Airport =

Airport in Alaska, United States

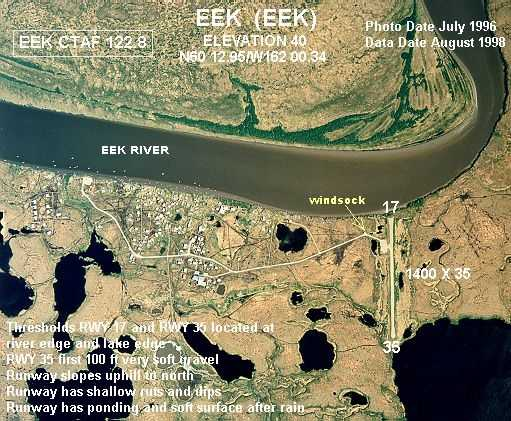
- IATA: EEK; ICAO: PAEE; FAA LID: EEK

Summary
- Airport type: Public
- Owner: State of Alaska DOT&PF - Central Region
- Serves: Eek, Alaska
- Elevation AMSL: 15 ft (4.6 m)
- Coordinates: 60°12′49″N 162°02′38″W

Map
- Location of airport in Alaska

Runways
Direction	Length		Surface
Direction	ft	m	Surface
17/35	3,242	988	Gravel

Statistics (2016)
- Aircraft operations (2012): 300
- Based aircraft (2017): 0
- Passengers: 6,461
- Freight: 820,000 lbs
- Source: Federal Aviation Administration; Source: Bureau of Transportation

Eek Airport (IATA: EEK, ICAO: PAEE, FAA LID: EEK) is a state-owned public-use airport serving the city of Eek in the Bethel Census Area of the U.S. state of Alaska.

As per Federal Aviation Administration records, this airport had 3,759 passenger boardings (enplanements) in calendar year 2007, an increase of 16% from the 3,241 enplanements in 2006.

== Facilities ==
Eek Airport has one runway designated 17/35 with a 3,243 x 60 ft (988 x 18 m) gravel surface.

A federally funded project relocated the airport to a new location about two miles west of Eek. The former airport had a 1,400 by 35 ft runway and was located east of Eek at coordinates 60°12.95′N 162°00.35′W.

== Airlines and destinations ==
Airlines	Destinations
Grant Aviation	Bethel, Quinhagak
Yute Commuter Service	Bethel, Quinhagak

=== Statistics ===
Carrier shares: January – December 2016
Carrier	Passengers (arriving and departing)
Hageland	3,520(54.50%)
Yute	2,760(42.67%)
Grant	180(2.77%)

Top domestic destinations: January – December 2016
Rank	City	Airport	Passengers	Carriers
1	(Alaska) Bethel, AK	Bethel Airport	2,440	Yute, Grant, Hageland
2	(Alaska) Quinhagak, AK	Quinhagak Airport	630	Grant, Hageland
3	(Alaska) Tuntutuliak, AK	Tuntutuliak Airport	70	Grant

== See also ==
- List of airports in Alaska
