= Lena Atti =

- Kayuungiar
- Born: 1926; Kipnuk, Territory of Alaska, US
- Died: April 27, 2020 (aged 93–94); Kwigillingok, Alaska, US
- Known for: Traditional grass weaving

Lena Atti (1926–2020) was an Alaskan artist from Kwigillingok. She was an expert in the traditional craft of grass weaving to make garments and other objects. Her Yup'ik name was Kayuungiar. She was born in Kipnuk, Alaska and at the age of 14 began studying grass weaving under the tutelage of her mother. In turn she taught her daughter, Gladys Atti, and the community how to weave.

Grass weaving is mostly associated with basket weaving, but "in Atti's region, grass once was used for all manner of handy everyday items, including bags, backpacks, storage mats and sleeping pallets. Grass socks were worn mainly by men, the bulk of whose work was done in the snow." To make a pair of grass socks would take Atti five to six hours of work a day for about a week.

Her work is included in the National Museum of the American Indian and the Anchorage Museum.
