= Goodnews Airport =

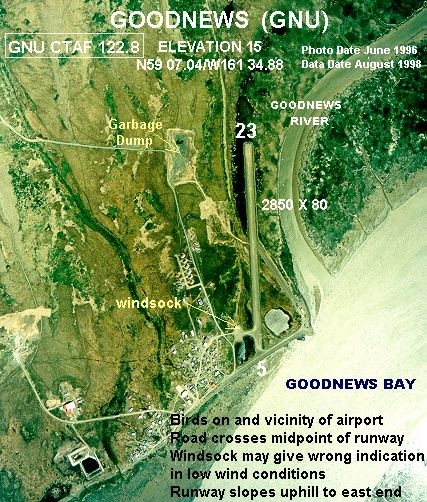
- IATA: GNU; ICAO: none; FAA LID: GNU

Summary
- Airport type: Public
- Owner: State of Alaska DOT&PF - Central Region
- Serves: Goodnews, Alaska
- Elevation AMSL: 15 ft (4.6 m)
- Coordinates: 59°07′03″N 161°34′39″W

Map
- Location of airport in Alaska

Runways
Direction	Length		Surface
Direction	ft	m	Surface
5/23	2,835	864	Gravel

Statistics
- Aircraft operations (2006): 3,200
- Enplanements (2008): 1,532
- Source: Federal Aviation Administration

Goodnews Airport (IATA: GNU, FAA LID: GNU) is a state-owned public-use airport located at Goodnews Bay in the Bethel Census Area of the U.S. state of Alaska.

As per Federal Aviation Administration records, this airport had 1,532 commercial passenger boardings (enplanements) in calendar year 2008, a decrease of 2.2% from the 1,567 enplanements in 2007. Goodnews Airport is included in the FAA's National Plan of Integrated Airport Systems (2009–2013), which categorizes it as a general aviation facility.

== Facilities and aircraft ==
Goodnews Airport has one runway designated 5/23 with a gravel surface measuring 2,835 by 80 feet (864 x 24 m). For the 12-month period ending July 31, 2006, the airport had 3,200 aircraft operations, an average of 266 per month: 62.5% general aviation and 37.5% air taxi. This airport has been surveyed by the National Geodetic Survey.

== Airlines and destinations ==
Airlines	Destinations
Yute Commuter Service	Bethel, Platinum

== See also ==
- List of airports in Alaska
