= CYF =

CYF may refer to:

- Chow Yun-fat (born 1955), Hong Kong actor
- Cyf., a suffix for a private company limited by shares in Wales, short for Cyfyngedig
- Chefornak Airport (IATA: CYF), an airport in Chefornak, Alaska
- Child, Youth and Family (New Zealand), a New Zealand social agency
- Ciencia ficción y fantasía (as CYF or CyF), Spanish for "science fiction and fantasy" as a supergenre designation
