= GGV =

GGV may refer to:

- Gargrave railway station, in England
- Gandang Gabi Vice, a Filipino comedy talk show
- GGV Capital, an American venture capital firm
- Guru Ghasidas Vishwavidyalaya, a university in Chhattisgarh, India
- Kwigillingok Airport, in Alaska (FAA location identifier 'GGV')
