= IIK =

IIK or Iik may fer to:

- IIK, the FAA LID code for Kipnuk Airport
- Islingby IK, a Swedish football club
- Iik, a city in Alaska, United States
