= EWU =

EWU may refer to:

- Ewu, a town in Nigeria
- East West University, a private university in Dhaka, Bangladesh
- East–West University, a private university in Chicago, Illinois, United States
- Eastern Washington University, a public university in Cheney, Washington, United States
- Edward Waters University a HBCU in Jacksonville, Florida
- Newtok Airport, in Alaska
- European Wrestling Union, defunct professional wrestling association, original sponsors of the European Heavyweight Championship
