= Toksook Bay Airport =

Airport in Alaska, United States

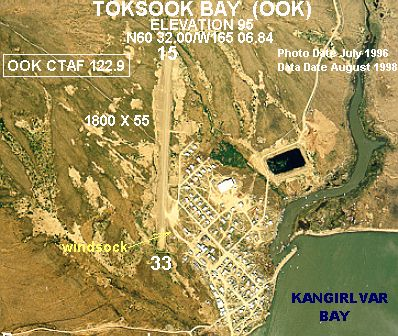
- IATA: OOK; ICAO: PAOO; FAA LID: OOK

Summary
- Airport type: Public
- Owner: State of Alaska DOT&PF - Central Region
- Serves: Toksook Bay, Alaska
- Elevation AMSL: 59 ft (18 m)
- Coordinates: 60°32′29″N 165°05′14″W

Map
- Location of airport in Alaska

Runways
Direction	Length		Surface
Direction	ft	m	Surface
16/34	3,218	981	Gravel

Statistics
- Enplanements (2007): 4,875
- Source: Federal Aviation Administration

Toksook Bay Airport (IATA: OOK, ICAO: PAOO, FAA LID: OOK) is a state-owned public-use airport located one nautical mile (1.8 km) east of the central business district of Toksook Bay, a city in the Bethel Census Area of the U.S. state of Alaska.

As per Federal Aviation Administration records, this airport had 4,875 passenger boardings (enplanements) in calendar year 2007, an increase of 6% from the 4,583 enplanements in 2006.

== Facilities ==
Toksook Bay Airport covers an area of 82 acres (33 ha) at an elevation of 59 feet (18 m) above mean sea level. It has one runway designated 16/34 with a gravel surface measuring 3,218 by 60 feet (981 × 18 m).

== Airlines and destinations ==
Airlines	Destinations
Grant Aviation	Bethel, Mekoryuk
Ryan Air	Bethel, Tununak, Mekoryuk

== See also ==
- List of airports in Alaska
