= Kasigluk Airport =

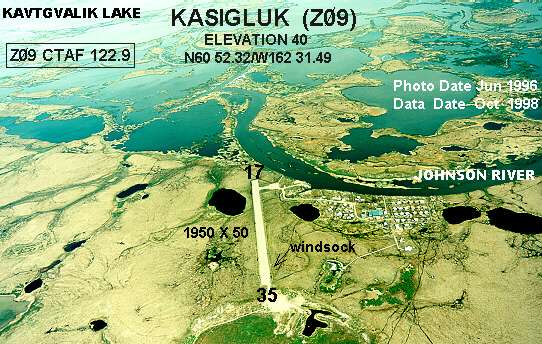
- Aerial photo showing runway prior to expansion
- IATA: KUK; ICAO: PFKA; FAA LID: Z09

Summary
- Airport type: Public
- Owner: State of Alaska DOT&PF - Central Region
- Serves: Kasigluk, Alaska
- Elevation AMSL: 40 ft (12 m)
- Coordinates: 60°52′24″N 162°31′28″W

Map
- Location of airport in Alaska

Runways
Direction	Length		Surface
Direction	ft	m	Surface
17/35	3,000	914	Gravel

Statistics
- Enplanements (2007): 4,001
- Source: Federal Aviation Administration

Kasigluk Airport (IATA: KUK, ICAO: PFKA, FAA LID: Z09) is a state-owned public-use airport located two nautical miles (4 km) south of the central business district of Kasigluk, in the Bethel Census Area of the U.S. state of Alaska.

As per Federal Aviation Administration records, this airport had 4,001 passenger boardings (enplanements) in calendar year 2007, a decrease of 5% from the 4,218 enplanements in 2006.

== Facilities ==
Kasigluk Airport has one runway designated 17/35 with a gravel surface measuring 3,000 by 60 feet (914 x 18 m). The runway was previously 1,950 by 50 feet.

== Airlines and destinations ==
Airlines	Destinations
Grant Aviation	Bethel, Nunapitchuk

=== Top destinations ===
Busiest domestic routes out of KUK (July 2010 - June 2011)
Rank	City	Passengers	Carriers
1	(Alaska) Bethel, AK	3,000	Grant, Hageland

== See also ==
- List of airports in Alaska
