= Scammon Bay Airport =

- IATA: SCM; ICAO: PACM; FAA LID: SCM

Summary
- Airport type: Public
- Owner: Alaska DOT&PF - Central Region
- Serves: Scammon Bay, Alaska
- Elevation AMSL: 14 ft / 4 m
- Coordinates: 61°50′43″N 165°34′17″W

Map
- Location of airport in Alaska

Runways
Direction	Length		Surface
Direction	ft	m	Surface
10/28	3,000	914	Gravel
4W/22W	10,000	3,048	Water
- Source: Federal Aviation Administration

Scammon Bay Airport (IATA: SCM, ICAO: PACM, FAA LID: SCM) is a state-owned public-use airport located in Scammon Bay, a city in the Kusilvak Census Area of the U.S. state of Alaska.

== Facilities ==
Scammon Bay Airport covers an area of 103 acres (42 ha) at an elevation of 14 feet (4 m) above mean sea level. It has one runways designated 10/28 with a 3,000 by 75 feet (914 x 23 m) gravel surface, and one seaplane landing area designated 4W/22W which measures 10,000 by 500 feet (3,048 x 152 m).

== Airlines and destinations ==
Airlines	Destinations
Grant Aviation	Bethel, Chevak, Hooper Bay

== See also ==
- List of airports in Alaska
