= Kwigillingok Airport =

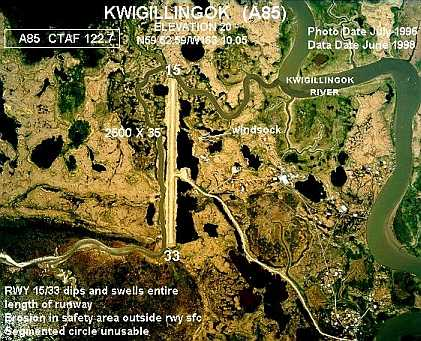

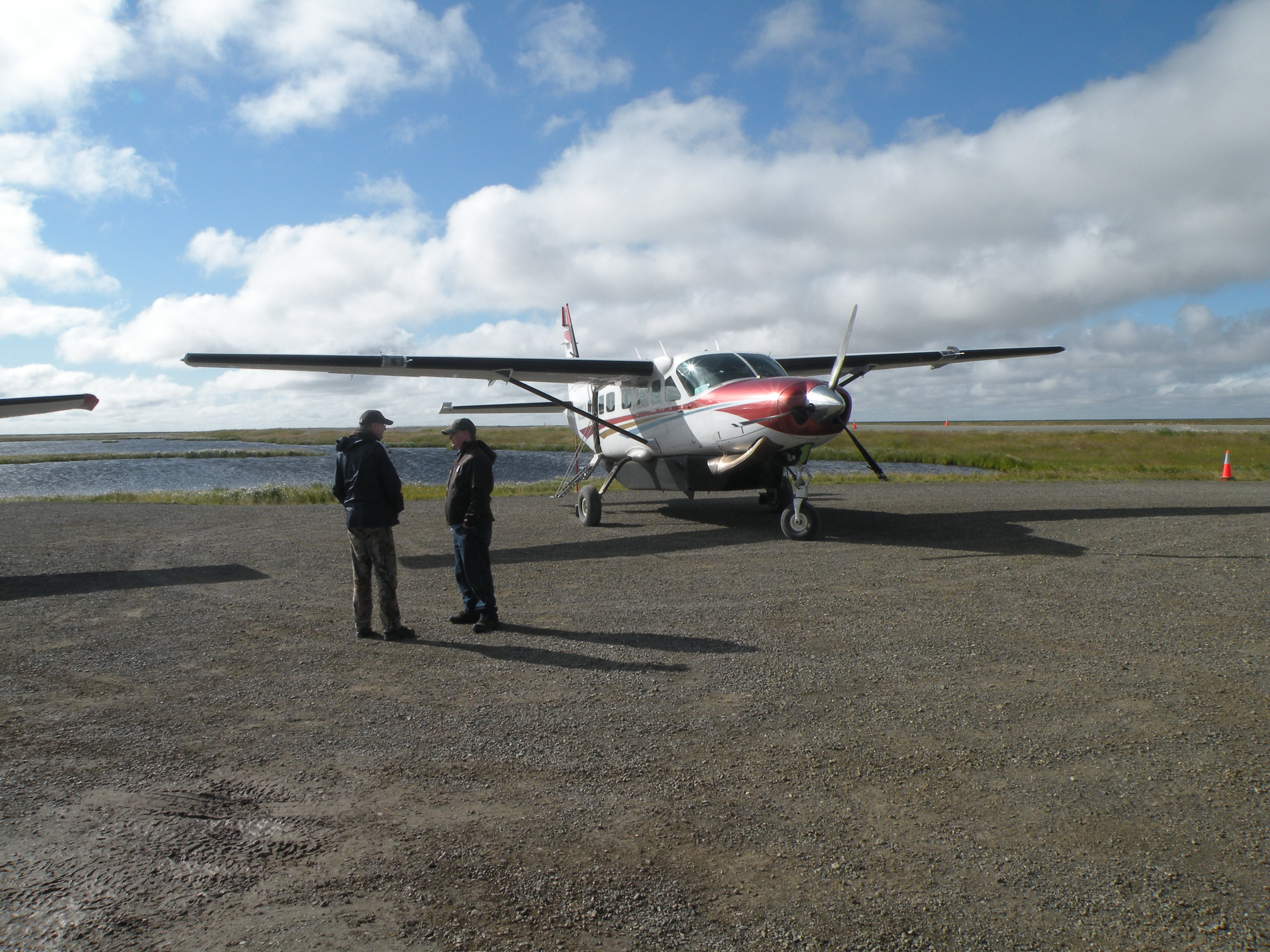
- Airstrip at Kwigillingok
- IATA: KWK; ICAO: PAGG; FAA LID: GGV

Summary
- Airport type: Public
- Owner: Native Village of Kwigillingok
- Location: Kwigillingok, Alaska
- Elevation AMSL: 18 ft / 5 m
- Coordinates: 59°52′35″N 163°10′07″W

Map
- Location of airport in Alaska

Runways
Direction	Length		Surface
Direction	ft	m	Surface
15/33	1,835	559	Gravel
- Source: Federal Aviation Administration

Kwigillingok Airport (IATA: KWK, ICAO: PAGG, FAA LID: GGV, formerly A85) is owned by the Native Village of Kwigillingok and is a public-use airport located one mile (two kilometres) northwest of the central business district of Kwigillingok, in the Bethel Census Area of the U.S. state of Alaska. There is also a nearby seaplane landing area known as Kwigillingok Seaplane Base (FAA LID: KWK).

Although most U.S. airports use the same three-letter location identifier for the Federal Aviation Administration and International Air Transport Association, the airport is assigned GGV by the FAA and KWK by the IATA.

== Facilities ==
The airport has one gravel runway (15/33) measuring 1,835 x 40 ft. (559 x 12 m).

== Airlines and destinations ==
Airlines	Destinations
Grant Aviation	Bethel, Tuntutuliak
Ryan Air	Bethel, Kongiganak

Kwigillingok Airport was the most dangerous airport that Alaskan commuter airline Ravn Alaska served, with its sole runway boasting an incredibly narrow width of just over 40 feet. The runway is, essentially, on an island among the numerous creeks, rivers, and other water bodies that are common to the geographical region, as it spans a stretch of land roughly two thousand feet long and one hundred feet wide that connects to the mainland with sparsely placed, thin strips of land. The apron, and the short taxiway to the apron, are both located on one of these thin strips of land, making the taxiing of an aircraft extremely dangerous, as all parts of the airport have bodies of water that present a considerable hazard to aircraft on at least two (2) sides.

== See also ==
- List of airports in Alaska
