= Bethel Airport =

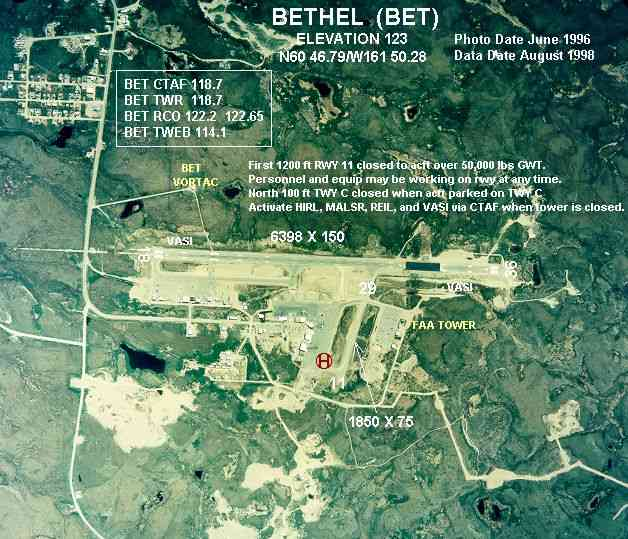
- IATA: BET; ICAO: PABE; FAA LID: BET

Summary
- Airport type: Public
- Owner: State of Alaska DOT&PF - Central Region
- Serves: Bethel, Alaska
- Hub for: Grant Aviation; Ryan Air; Yute Commuter Service
- Elevation AMSL: 129 ft (39 m)
- Coordinates: 60°46′43″N 161°50′14″W

Map
- Location of airport in Alaska

Runways
| Direction | Length | | Surface |
| Direction | ft | m | Surface |
|---|---|---|---|
| 1L/19R | 6,400 | 1,951 | Asphalt |
| 1R/19L | 4,000 | 1,219 | Asphalt |
| 12/30 | 1,858 | 566 | Asphalt/gravel |

Statistics (2018)
- Aircraft operations: 122,000
- Based aircraft: 112
- Passengers: 290,000
- Freight: 63,815,000 lbs
- Source: Federal Aviation Administration

Bethel Airport (IATA: BET, ICAO: PABE, FAA LID: BET) is a state-owned public-use airport located three nautical miles (6 km) southwest of the central business district of Bethel, a city in the Bethel Census Area of the U.S. state of Alaska.

As per Federal Aviation Administration records, the airport had 140,291 passenger boardings (enplanements) in calendar year 2008, 134,848 enplanements in 2009, and 144,353 in 2010. It is included in the National Plan of Integrated Airport Systems for 2011–2015, which categorized it as a primary commercial service airport (more than 10,000 enplanements per year).

== History ==
Construction began September 21, 1941, and the airfield was activated July 4, 1942; it was known as Bethel Air Base. It was used by Air Transport Command as auxiliary airfield for Lend-Lease aircraft being flown to Siberia. The facility was transferred to Eleventh Air Force, then to Alaskan Air Command in 1945; it became the joint-use Bethel Airport. It was used for construction of AC&W Bethel Air Force Station in the mid-1950s. Full jurisdiction was turned over to Alaska Government in 1958.

== Facilities and aircraft ==
Bethel Airport covers an area of 1,056 acres (427 ha) at an elevation of 129 feet (39 m) above mean sea level. It has three runways: 1L/19R is 6,400 by 150 feet (1,951 by 46 m) with an asphalt surface; 1R/19L is 4,000 by 75 feet (1,219 by 23 m) with an asphalt surface; 12/30 is 1,858 by 75 feet (566 by 23 m) with an asphalt/gravel surface.

For the 12-month period ending March 31, 2018, the airport had 122,000 aircraft operations, an average of 334 per day: 54% air taxi, 41% general aviation, 4% scheduled commercial, and 1% military. At that time there were 112 aircraft based at this airport: 86% single-engine, 6% multi-engine, 6% helicopter, and 2% military.

== Airlines and destinations ==
The following airlines offer scheduled passenger service:

| Airlines | Destinations |
|---|---|
| Alaska Airlines | Anchorage |
| Grant Aviation | Alakanuk, Atmautluak, Chefornak, Chevak, Dillingham, Eek, Emmonak, Hooper Bay, Kasigluk, Kipnuk, Kongiganak, Kotlik, Kwigillingok, Marshall, Mekoryuk, Mountain Village, Newtok, Nightmute, Nunam Iqua, Nunapitchuk, Pilot Station, Quinhagak, Scammon Bay, St. Mary's, Toksook Bay, Tuntutuliak, Tununak |
| Ryan Air | Aniak, Atmautluak, Chevak, Hooper Bay, Marshall, Mekoryuk, Scammon Bay, St. Mary's, Toksook Bay, Tununak |
| Yute Commuter Service | Akiachak, Akiak, Atmautluak, Chefornak, Eek, Goodnews Bay, Kasigluk, Kipnuk, Kongiganak, Kwethluk, Kwigillingok, Marshall, Mountain Village, Napakiak, Napaskiak, Newtok, Nightmute, Nunapitchuk, Pilot Station, Platinum, Quinhagak, Russian Mission, St. Mary's, Toksook Bay, Tuluksak, Tuntutuliak, Tununak |

== Statistics ==
=== Statistics ===
Top airlines at BET (November 2021 - October 2022)
| Rank | Airline | Passengers | Percent of market share |
|---|---|---|---|
| 1 | Alaska Airlines | 144,000 | 52.95% |
| 2 | Grant Aviation | 91,150 | 33.65% |
| 3 | Yute Commuter Service | 34,680 | 12.75% |
| 4 | Ryan Air | 1,740 | 0.64% |
| 5 | Northern Airlines | 20 | 0.01% |

Top domestic destinations (November 2021 - October 2022) === Top destinations ===
| Rank | City | Airport | Passengers | Carriers |
|---|---|---|---|---|
| 1 | Anchorage, AK | Ted Stevens Anchorage International Airport | 72,000 | Alaska |
| 2 | Emmonak, AK | Emmonak Airport | 4,720 | Grant |
| 3 | Quinhagak, AK | Quinhagak Airport | 4,120 | Grant, Yute |
| 4 | Chevak, AK | Chevak Airport | 4,100 | Grant, Ryan |
| 5 | Kipnuk, AK | Kipnuk Airport | 3,660 | Grant, Yute |
| 6 | Hooper Bay, AK | Hooper Bay Airport | 3,510 | Grant, Ryan |
| 7 | Toksook Bay, AK | Toksook Bay Airport | 2,830 | Grant, Ryan, Yute |
| 8 | Scammon Bay, AK | Scammon Bay Airport | 2,680 | Grant, Ryan |
| 9 | Chefornak, AK | Chefornak Airport | 2,520 | Grant, Yute |
| 10 | Kasigluk, AK | Kasigluk Airport | 2,290 | Grant, Yute |

== Cargo airlines ==
| Airline | Destination |
|---|---|
| Alaska Central Express | Anchorage |
| Everts Air Cargo | Anchorage |
| Lynden Air Cargo | Anchorage |
| Northern Air Cargo | Anchorage |

== See also ==
- List of airports in Alaska
