= Hooper Bay Airport =

- IATA: HPB; ICAO: PAHP; FAA LID: HPB

Summary
- Airport type: Public
- Owner: State of Alaska DOT&PF - Central Region
- Location: Hooper Bay, Alaska
- Elevation AMSL: 13 ft (4.0 m)
- Coordinates: 61°31′26″N 166°08′48″W

Map
- Location of airport in Alaska

Runways
Direction	Length		Surface
Direction	ft	m	Surface
14/32	3,300	1,006	Asphalt/gravel
- Source: Federal Aviation Administration

Hooper Bay Airport (IATA: HPB, ICAO: PAHP, FAA LID: HPB) is a state-owned public-use airport two miles (3 km) southwest of Hooper Bay, Alaska, United States.

== Facilities ==
Hooper Bay Airport covers an area of 395 acres (160 ha). It has one runway (14/32) with an asphalt and gravel surface measuring 3,300 x 75 ft (1,006 x 23 m).

== Airlines and destinations ==
Airlines	Destinations
Grant Aviation	Bethel, Scammon Bay, Chevak
Ryan Air	Bethel, Scammon Bay

=== Top destinations ===
Busiest domestic routes out of HPB (July 2010 - June 2011)
Rank	City	Passengers	Carriers
1	(Alaska) Bethel, AK	4,000	Grant, Hageland

== See also ==
- List of airports in Alaska
