= Lower Kuskokwim School District =

School district in Alaska, United States

Address
- 1004 Ron Edwards Memorial Drive Bethel, Alaska, 99559; United States

District information
- Type: Public
- Grades: PreK–12
- NCES District ID: 0200001

Students and staff
- Students: 3,823
- Teachers: 255.29
- Staff: 406.62
- Student–teacher ratio: 14.98

Other information
- Website: www.lksd.org

Lower Kuskokwim School District (LKSD), or Bethel Public Schools, is a school district headquartered in Bethel, Alaska. As of 2017, it was the largest rural school district in the state, with 4,300 students.

== Employment and teacher demographics ==
In 2017, it had about 300 certified teachers, with about 20% being Alaska Natives, the highest percentage of any Alaskan school district.

The district, as of 2017, pays for the education of prospective teachers, sending them to University of Alaska Fairbanks (UAF); the district pays all of a student's costs if they go to UAF; the LKSD board also offers scholarships for students attending other universities. The stipulation is that students who get the scholarships are obligated to teach at LKSD, with one year of teaching per year of scholarship. In 2013 LKSD began requiring teachers without university degrees to work towards getting them, and in 2017 it set a ten-year deadline for doing so. Most of its non-certified teachers taught in rural schools. According to Alaska state law a person without a university degree may still become a full-time teacher if he/she has fluency in a native language of Alaska. The district prioritizes hiring teachers with Yupik language skills and has a preference for local teachers.

In the period 2007-2012, it had an annual teacher turnover rate of 15%, or 60-70 teaching jobs, lower than many rural school districts though higher than urban ones.

== Schools ==
=== Bethel schools ===
Regular:

- Bethel Regional High School
- Gladys Jung Elementary School
  - Jung, previously known as the Kilbuck School, serves grades 3–6. As of 2018 its enrollment was about 345.
- Mekelnguut Elitnauriviat School
  - Nicknamed the "M.E. School," it serves grades kindergarten through 2. As of 2018 it had 260 students and 18 teachers.
- Ayaprun Elitnaurvik School
  - It is a K-6 Yup’ik-English bilingual program that originated from a total immersion language program established in 1995. As of 2002 the school had 197 students. The school occupies space in Mekelnguut Elitnauriviat and Gladys Jung schools; as of 2002, kindergarten and first grade are in Mekelnguut Elitnauriviat and the remaining grades are in Gladys Jung.

Other:

- Kuskokwim Learning Academy (KLA) - Bethel

=== Rural PreK-12 schools ===
- Joann A. Alexie Memorial School - Atmautluak
  - As of 2018 it had about 118 students.
- Chaputnguak School & Amaqigciq School - Chefornak
  - "Chaputnguak," an old name for Chefornak, is a Yup'ik word referring to an object or thing obstructing a pathway, while the latter is named after the first inhabitant of Chefornak, Alexie Amaqigciq.
- Eek School
  - As of 2018 it had 120 students. It is a bilingual school.
- Rocky Mountain School - Goodnews Bay
  - As of 2018 it had one of the lowest enrollments in LKSD as it has 54 students.
- Kasigluk-Akula Elitnaurvik School - Kasigluk
  - It is a bilingual English-Yugtun school. As of 2018 it had about 120 students.
- Kasigluk Akiuk Memorial School - Kasigluk
  - As of 2018 it had about 100 students.
- Chief Paul Memorial School - Kipnuk
  - As of 2018 it had 190 students.
- Ayagina’ar Elitnaurvik School - Kongiganak
  - As of 2018 it served 174 students.
- Ket’acik & Apaalluk Memorial School - Kwethluk
  - As of 2018 it had about 250 students and 15 teachers.
- Kwigillingok School - Kwigillingok
  - As of 2018 it had about 119 students, 12 teachers, and 10 other employees.
- Nuniwarmiut School - Mekoryuk
  - In 1984 the building was constructed.
- William N. Miller Memorial School - Napakiak
  - As of 2018 it had 96 students.
- Zacharias John Williams Memorial School - Napaskiak
  - As of 2018 it had 155 students, with 90% classified as learners of English as a second language, 85% are on free or reduced lunch programs, and the majority are of Central Yupik Eskimo origins; that year only two students were not Yupik. That year the school had 34 employees, with four of them being native Alaskans; the employees included 16 teachers. The current building opened in October 2016, and the original building opened in 1982.
- Ayaprun School - Newtok (moving to Mertarvik)
  - As of 2018 the school had 128 students, 12 teachers, and 27 other employees. Mertarvik Pioneer School is the continuation, as people from Newtok are moving to Mertarvik due to erosion of the former. As of 2020 it uses temporary facilities in the Mertarvik Education Center (MEC) before a permanent school is to be constructed. The school has teachers using English and Yugtun as mediums of instruction. The Mertarvik school's initial enrollment was 10 and it began operations on October 14, 2019. It initially had four teachers with half using each language as a medium.
- Negtemiut Elitnaurviat School - Nightmute
- Anna Tobeluk Memorial School - Nunapitchuk
  - As of 2018 the school had 203 students, 15 certified teachers, and 16 classified employees. English is the sole language of instruction at Tobeluk.
- Qugcuun Memorial School - Oscarville
  - As of 2018 the school had 13 students. It is a bilingual English-Yup'ik school.
- Arviq School - Platinum
  - Due to a decline in student enrollment it closed in Spring 2001, but it reopened in October 2007. As of 2018 the school had 20 students.
- Kuinerrarmiut Elitnaurviat School - Quinhagak
- Nelson Island School - Toksook Bay
- Lewis Angapak Memorial School - Tuntutuliak
  - As of 2018 the students were Yupik people.
- Paul T. Albert Memorial School (PTAMS) - Tununak
  - It is a bilingual English-Yugtun school. As of 2018 there were about 108 students at the school, all Alaska Natives. In 2003 it was the building of the largest size in Tununak. Kimberly C. Price, who formerly taught at the school, stated that students are in mainly Yupik speaking houses and generally retain fluency of the language.
