= Mekoryuk Airport =

- IATA: MYU; ICAO: PAMY; FAA LID: MYU

Summary
- Airport type: Public
- Owner: Alaska DOT&PF - Central Region
- Serves: Mekoryuk, Alaska
- Elevation AMSL: 48 ft / 15 m
- Coordinates: 60°22′17″N 166°16′14″W

Map
- Location of airport in Alaska MYU (the United States)

Runways
| Direction | Length | | Surface |
| Direction | ft | m | Surface |
|---|---|---|---|
| 5/23 | 3,070 | 936 | Gravel |
- Source: Federal Aviation Administration

Mekoryuk Airport (IATA: MYU, ICAO: PAMY, FAA LID: MYU) is a state-owned public-use airport located three nautical miles (5.5 km) west of the central business district of Mekoryuk, a city in the Bethel Census Area, on Nunivak Island, of the U.S. state of Alaska. Airport operations began in October 1960.

== Facilities ==
Mekoryuk Airport covers an area of 575 acres (233 ha) at an elevation of 48 feet (15 m) above mean sea level. It has one runway designated 5/23 with a gravel surface measuring 3,070 by 75 feet (936 x 23 m). It has no control tower.

== Airlines and destinations ==
| Airlines | Destinations |
|---|---|
| Grant Aviation | Bethel, St. Mary's |

== See also ==
- List of airports in Alaska
