= Tununak, Alaska =

Tununak Tununeq
- CDP
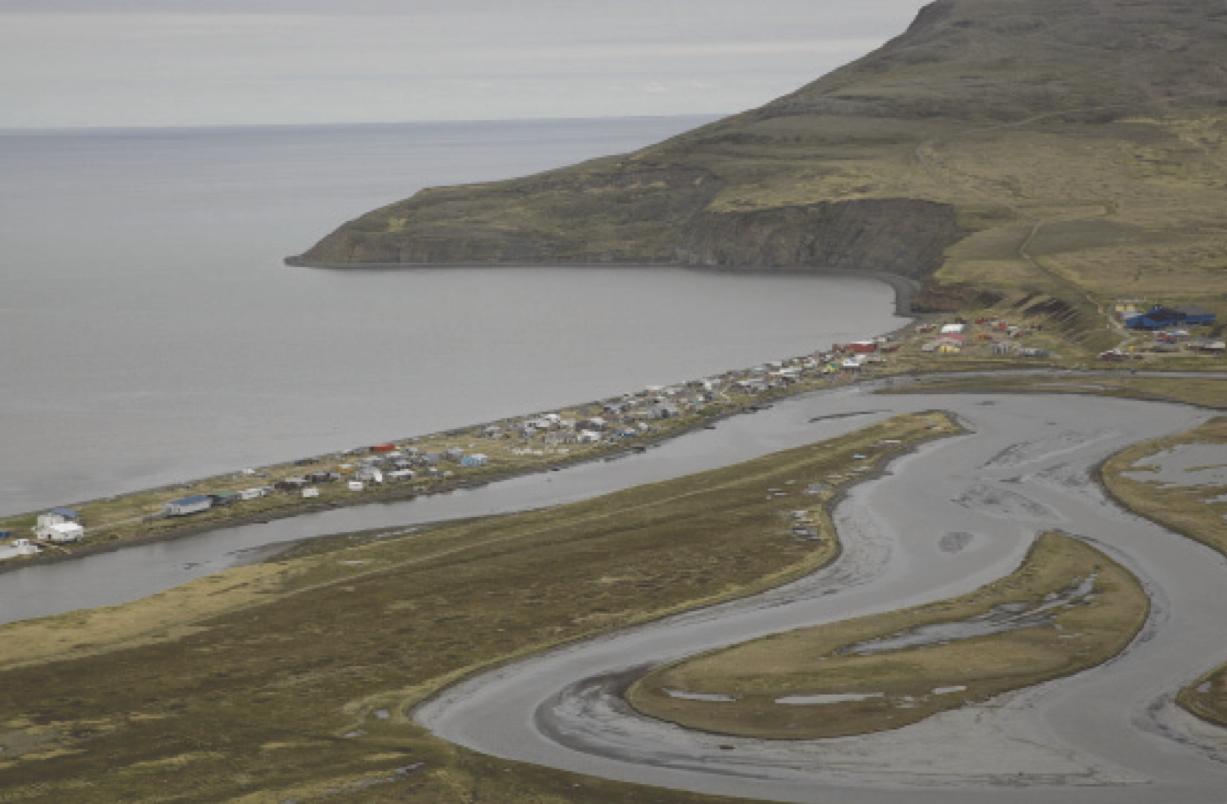
- Aerial view of Tununak

- Location within the state of Alaska
- Coordinates: 60°34′50″N 165°15′34″W
- Country: United States
- State: Alaska
- Census Area: Bethel

Government
  - State senator: Lyman Hoffman (D)
  - State rep.: Conrad McCormick (D)

Area
  - Total: 60.95 sq mi (157.85 km^{2})
  - Land: 60.71 sq mi (157.23 km^{2})
  - Water: 0.24 sq mi (0.62 km^{2})

Population (2020)
  - Total: 411
  - Density: 6.8/sq mi (2.61/km^{2})
- Time zone: UTC-9 (Alaska (AKST))
  - Summer (DST): UTC-8 (AKDT)
- ZIP code: 99681
- Area code: 907
- FIPS code: 02-79230

Tununak (Too-new-nak) (Central Yupik: Tununeq) is a census-designated place (CDP) in Bethel Census Area, Alaska, United States. At the 2020 census, the population was 411.

== Geography ==
Tununak is located at 60°34′50″N 165°15′34″W (60.580477, -165.259486).

It is located on the northwest side of Nelson Island in the Bering Sea. It is approximately 5 miles (8.0 km) from the closest village Toksook Bay and a year-round trail exists between the two villages.

According to the United States Census Bureau, the CDP has a total area of 60.7 square miles (157 km^{2}), of which, 60.5 square miles (157 km^{2}) of it is land and 0.2 square miles (0.52 km^{2}) of it (0.33%) is water.

== Demographics ==
Historical population
| Census | Pop. | Note | %± |
|---|---|---|---|
| 1880 | 8 | | — |
| 1890 | 48 | | 500.0% |
| 1940 | 65 | | — |
| 1950 | 112 | | 72.3% |
| 1960 | 183 | | 63.4% |
| 1970 | 274 | | 49.7% |
| 1980 | 298 | | 8.8% |
| 1990 | 316 | | 6.0% |
| 2000 | 325 | | 2.8% |
| 2010 | 327 | | 0.6% |
| 2020 | 411 | | 25.7% |
U.S. Decennial Census

Tununak was visited by Edward Nelson in December 1878, where he reported 6 people living there. Two years later, it first appeared on the 1880 U.S. Census as "Tanunak", an unincorporated village of 8 residents, all Inuit. It appeared on the 1890 census as the village of "Dununuk." A Roman Catholic mission was later established in 1891. In 1940, it appeared again as "Tanunak" until it was incorporated as Tununak in 1975. It was disincorporated in 1997 and made a census-designated place (CDP) effective with the 2000 census.

As of the census of 2000, there were 325 people, 82 households, and 59 families residing in the CDP. The population density was 5.4 people per square mile (2.1 people/km^{2}). There were 93 housing units at an average density of 1.5 per square mile (0.58/km^{2}). The racial makeup of the CDP was 94.77% Central Yupik, 3.08% White, and 2.15% from two or more races.

There were 82 households, out of which 47.6% had children under the age of 18 living with them, 50.0% were married couples living together, 7.3% had a female householder with no husband present, and 28.0% were non-families. 23.2% of all households were made up of individuals, and 1.2% had someone living alone who was 65 years of age or older. The average household size was 3.96 and the average family size was 5.00.

In the CDP, the population was spread out, with 42.5% under the age of 18, 10.8% from 18 to 24, 26.8% from 25 to 44, 12.9% from 45 to 64, and 7.1% who were 65 years of age or older. The median age was 23 years. For every 100 females, there were 139.0 males. For every 100 females age 18 and over, there were 159.7 males.

The median income for a household in the CDP was $25,000, and the median income for a family was $26,500. Males had a median income of $18,125 versus $0 for females. The per capita income for the CDP was $7,653. About 29.6% of families and 30.8% of the population were below the poverty line, including 37.9% of those under age 18 and 50.0% of those age 65 or over.

The naturalist Edward Nelson, who visited the island in 1878, noted 6 people living on Nelson Island: 5 Yupik and one non-Yupik trader.

== Composition ==
In 2003 there were seventy houses. There were also two shops and a video/DVD rental business.

== Government and infrastructure ==
In 2003 the community had a post office.

In 2003 "honey buckets" for human waste and wells for drinking water were used due to a lack of sewage and water systems.

== Education ==
Lower Kuskokwim School District operates Paul T. Albert Memorial School, K-12. It is a bilingual English-Yugtun school. As of 2018 there were about 108 students at the school, all Alaska Natives. In 2003 it was the building of the largest size in Tununak. Kimberly C. Price, who formerly taught at the school, stated that students are in mainly Yupik speaking houses and generally retain fluency of the language.

The Bureau of Indian Affairs (BIA) formerly operated a school in Tununak. It was converted into school district employee housing.

== Transportation ==
- Tununak Airport

There was a single main road.

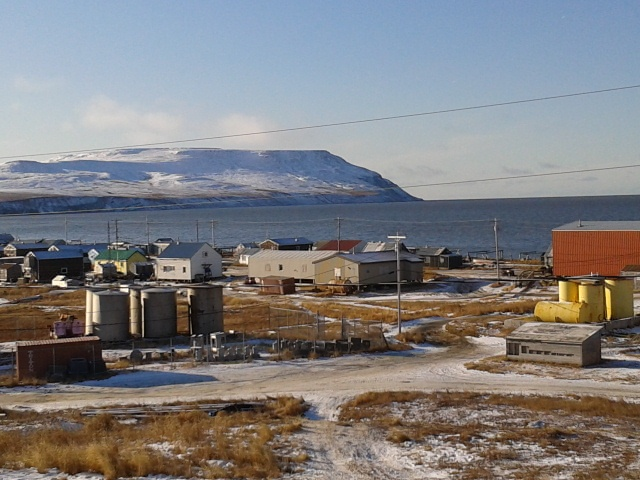
Tununak

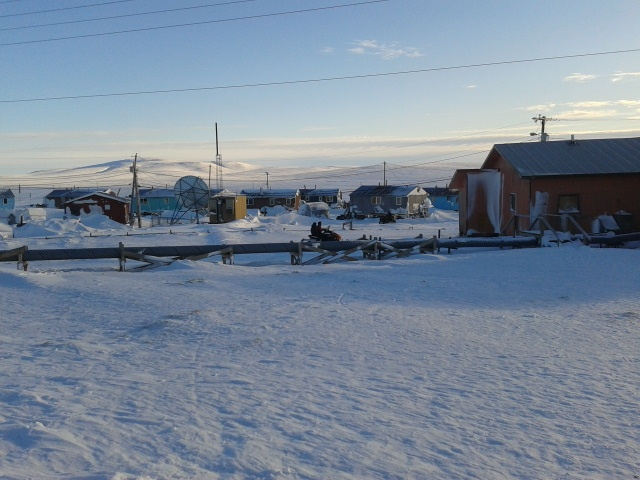
Tununak in the winter

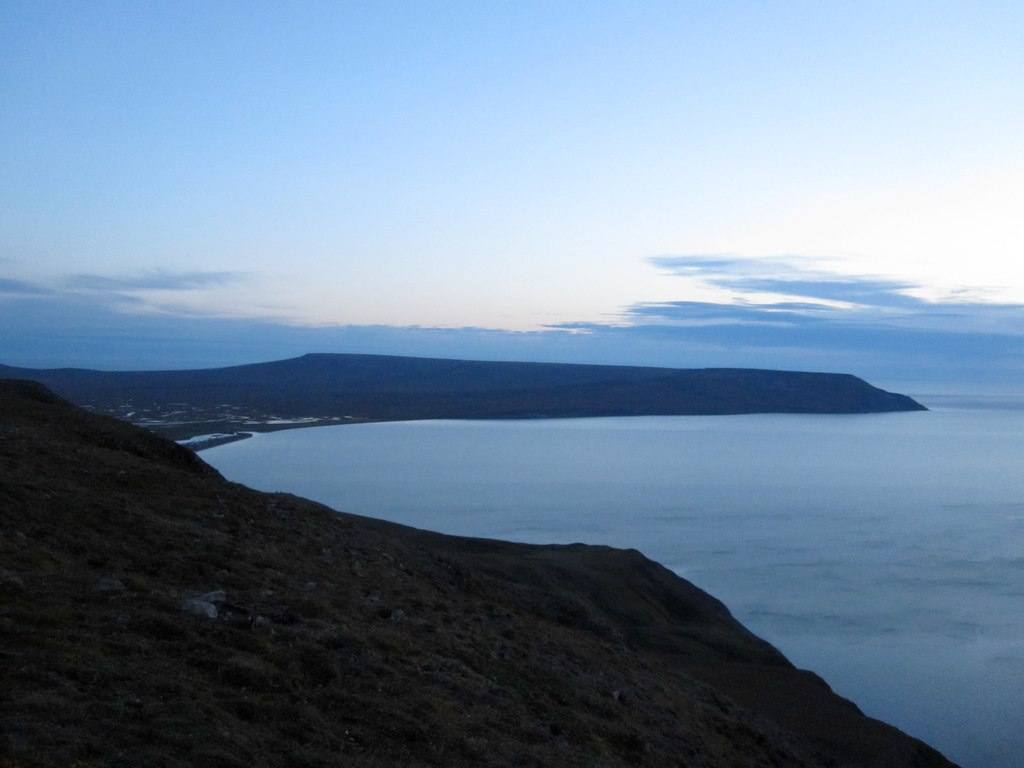
View towards Tununak from the north

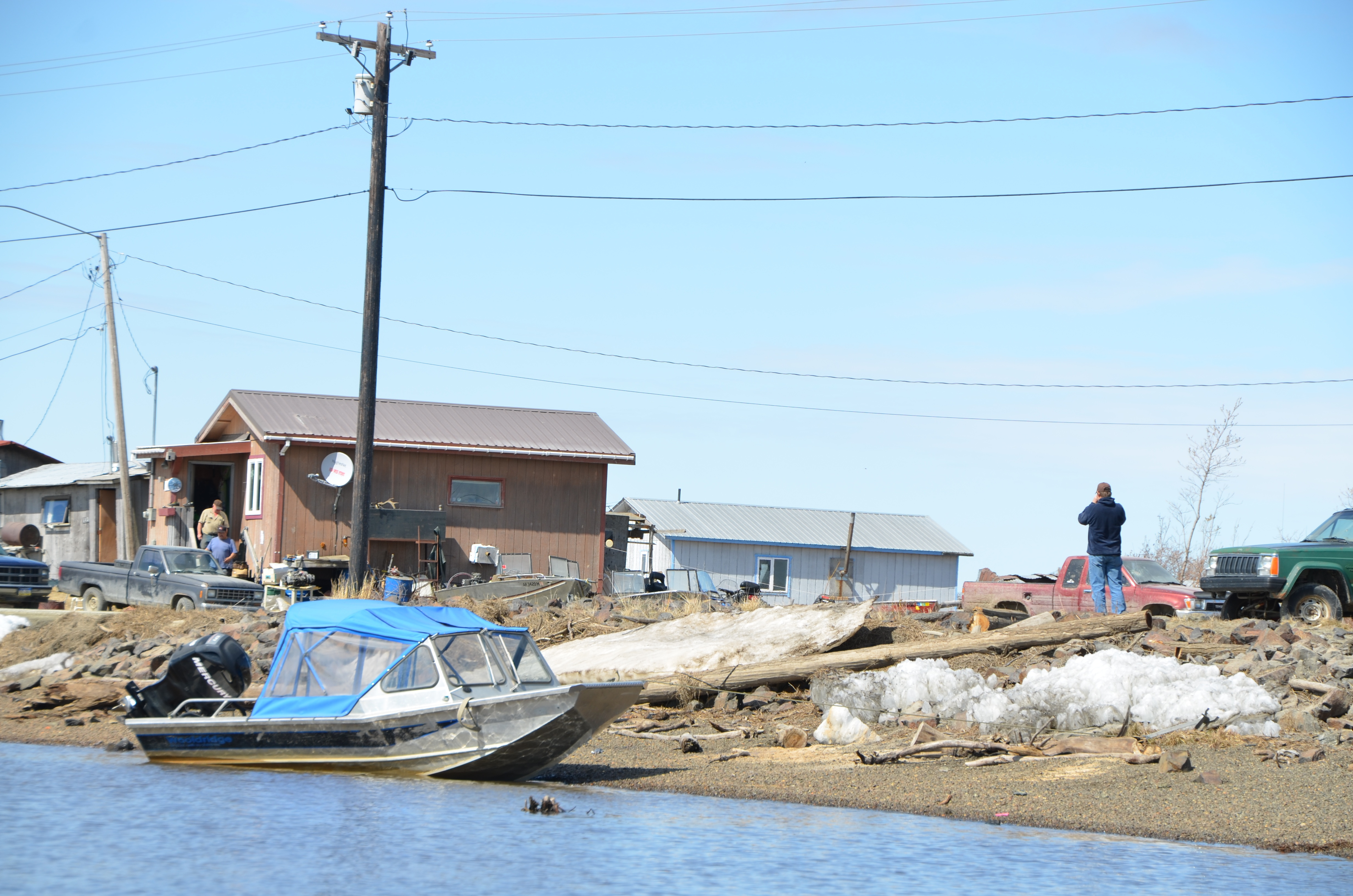
Houses in Tununak
