= Marshall Don Hunter Sr. Airport =

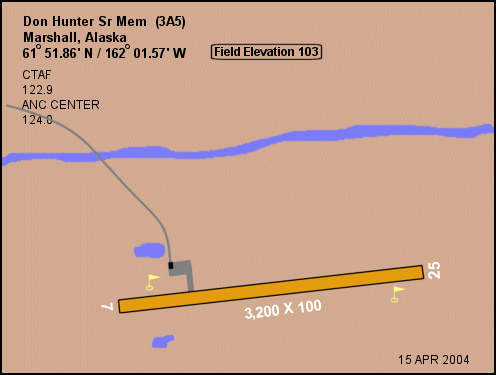
- IATA: MLL; ICAO: PADM; FAA LID: MDM

Summary
- Airport type: Public
- Owner: State of Alaska DOT&PF - Northern Region
- Location: Marshall, Alaska
- Elevation AMSL: 103 ft / 31 m
- Coordinates: 61°51′51″N 162°01′34″W

Map
- Location of airport in Alaska

Runways
Direction	Length		Surface
Direction	ft	m	Surface
7/25	3,201	976	Gravel
- Source: Federal Aviation Administration

Marshall Don Hunter Sr. Airport (IATA: MLL, ICAO: PADM, FAA LID: MDM, formerly 3A5) is a state-owned public-use airport located two nautical miles (3.7 km) southeast of the central business district of Marshall, a city in the Kusilvak Census Area of the U.S. state of Alaska.

Although most U.S. airports use the same three-letter location identifier for the FAA and IATA, Marshall Don Hunter Sr. Airport is assigned MDM by the FAA and MLL by the IATA (which assigned MDM to Munduku, Papua New Guinea).

== Facilities ==
Marshall Don Hunter Sr. Airport covers an area of 400 acres (160 ha) which contains one runway designated 7/25 with a 3,201 ft × 100 ft (976 m × 30 m) gravel surface.

== Airlines and destinations ==
Airlines	Destinations
Grant Aviation	Bethel, Pilot Station
Ryan Air	Bethel, St. Mary's

== See also ==
- List of airports in Alaska
