= Nightmute Airport =

- IATA: NME; ICAO: PAGT; FAA LID: IGT

Summary
- Airport type: Public
- Owner: Alaska DOT&PF - Central Region
- Serves: Nightmute, Alaska
- Elevation AMSL: 4 ft / 1 m
- Coordinates: 60°28′16″N 164°42′03″W

Map
- Location of airport in Alaska

Runways
Direction	Length		Surface
Direction	ft	m	Surface
3/21	1,600	488	Gravel
- Source: Federal Aviation Administration

Nightmute Airport (IATA: NME, ICAO: PAGT, FAA LID: IGT) is a state-owned public-use airport located southeast of the central business district of Nightmute, a village in the Bethel Census Area of the U.S. state of Alaska.

Although most U.S. airports use the same three-letter location identifier for the FAA and IATA, this airport is assigned IGT by the FAA and NME by the IATA.

== Facilities ==
Nightmute Airport has one runway designated 3/21 with a gravel surface measuring 1,600 by 50 feet (488 x 15 m).

== Airlines and destinations ==
Airlines	Destinations
Grant Aviation	Bethel

== See also ==
- List of airports in Alaska
