= Kongiganak, Alaska =

Kongiganak Kangirnaq
- CDP
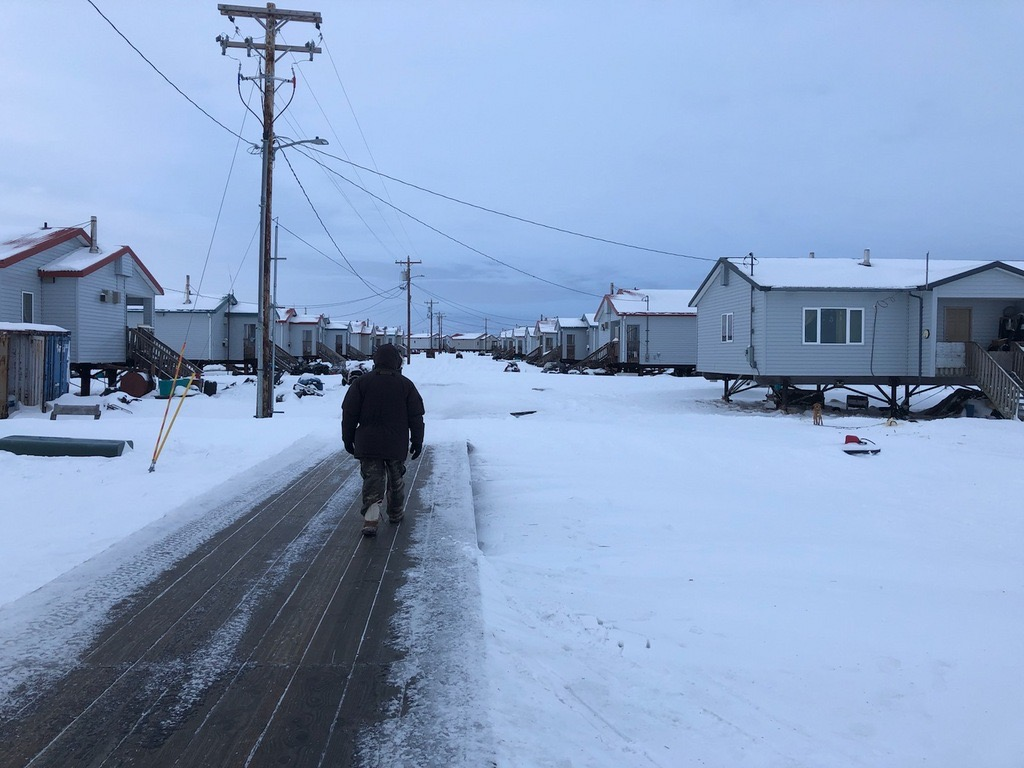
- Many residents live in the newer "housing" section of town

- Location within the state of Alaska
- Coordinates: 59°57′14″N 162°53′43″W
- Country: United States
- State: Alaska
- Census Area: Bethel

Government
  - State senator: Lyman Hoffman (D)
  - State rep.: Conrad McCormick (D)

Area
  - Total: 13.38 sq mi (34.65 km^{2})
  - Land: 13.27 sq mi (34.36 km^{2})
  - Water: 0.11 sq mi (0.29 km^{2})

Population (2020)
  - Total: 486
  - Density: 36.6/sq mi (14.14/km^{2})
- Time zone: UTC-9 (Alaska (AKST))
  - Summer (DST): UTC-8 (AKDT)
- ZIP code: 99545
- Area code: 907
- FIPS code: 02-41610

Kongiganak (Central Yupik: Kangirnaq), also known colloquially as Kong, is a census-designated place (CDP) in Bethel Census Area, Alaska, United States, and primarily sits on the eastern shore of the Kongiganak River. As of the 2020 census, the population was 486, up from 439 in 2010.

== Geography ==
Kongiganak is located at 59°57′14″N 162°53′43″W (59.953896, -162.895199).

According to the United States Census Bureau, the CDP has a total area of 1.9 square miles (4.9 km^{2}), of which 1.7 square miles (4.4 km^{2}) are land and 0.2-square-mile (0.52 km^{2}) (9.14%) is water.

== History ==
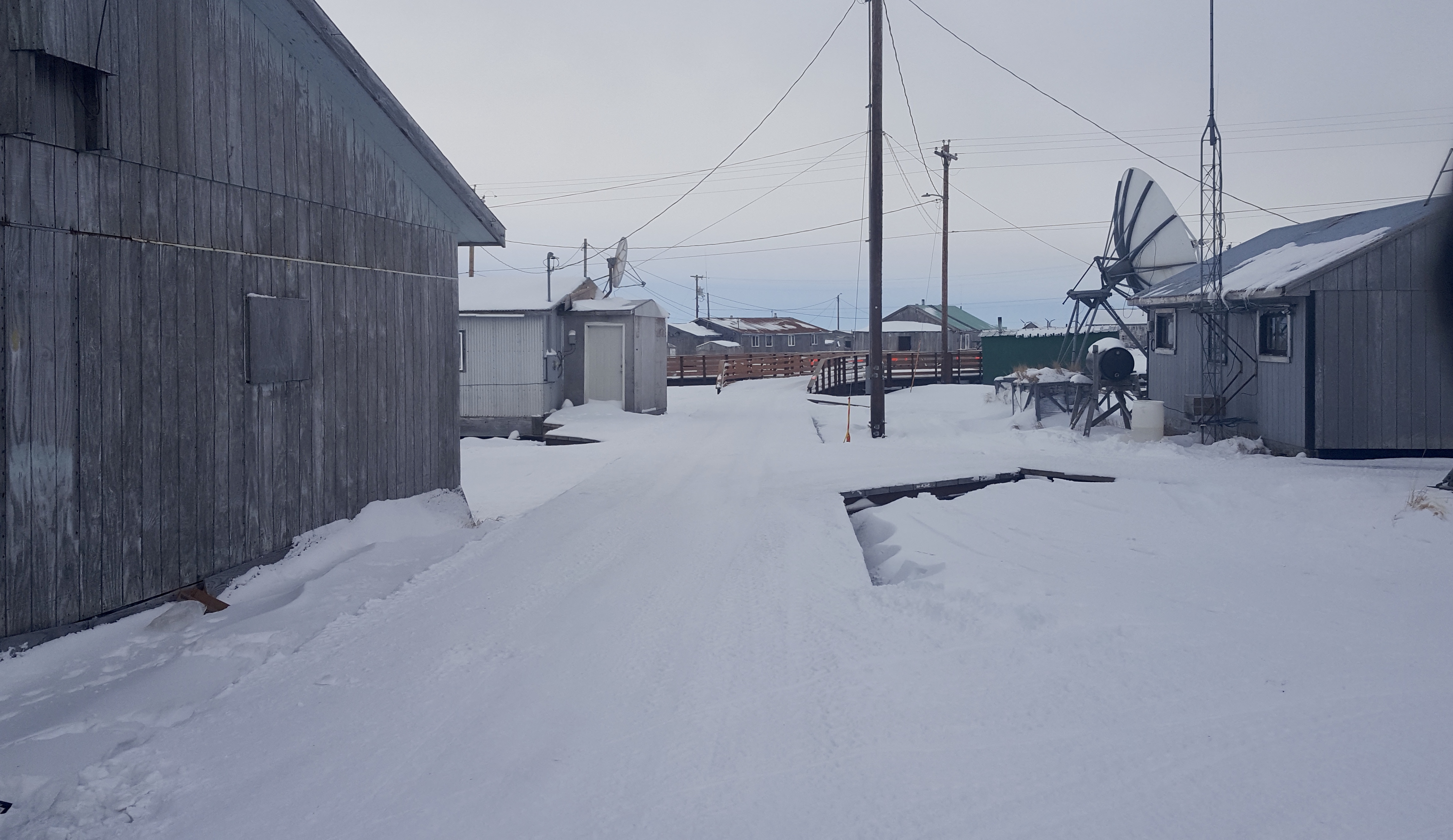
The older "downtown" section of Kong contains most businesses and public buildings in the town

The original Kongiganak was settled in the 19th century and was located on a small creek just above Kuskokwim Bay. In 1880, it was called "Kongiganagamute" and had a population of 175 Inuit. The site was later abandoned. It is located a few miles east of present-day Kwigillingok and about 9 miles southeast of the current Kongiganak.

The current Kongiganak was permanently settled in the 1960s when former residents of Kwigillingok sought higher ground in search of relief from floods.

It is served by Kongiganak Airport.

In 2021, 2 no longer needed U.S. National Guard buildings in the village were transferred to Qemirtalek Coast Corporation, which planned to hand over the former armories to the tribal government for repurposing into health services buildings.

As of 2023, Kongiganak residents cite clean water, sanitation and thawing permafrost, which is negatively affecting its infrastructure, as major issues.

== Demographics ==
Historical population
Census	Pop.	Note	%±
1970	190		—
1980	239		25.8%
1990	294		23.0%
2000	359		22.1%
2010	439		22.3%
2020	486		10.7%
U.S. Decennial Census

The current settlement of Kongiganak first appeared on the 1970 U.S. Census as an unincorporated village. In 1980, it was reclassified as a census-designated place (CDP).

As of the census of 2020, there were 486 people, 53 households, and 47 families residing in the CDP. The population density was 36.6 inhabitants per square mile (14.1/km^{2}). There were 62 housing units at an average density of 4.63 per square mile (1.79/km^{2}). The racial makeup of the CDP was 2.6% White, 94.7% Native American, and 7.2% from two or more races. 0.2% of the population were Hispanic or Latino of any race.

There were 53 households, out of which 39.9% had children under the age of 18 living with them, 47.2% were married couples living together, 41.5% had a male householder with no spouse present, 5.7% had a female householder with no spouse present. The average family size was 6.55.

In the CDP, the population was spread out, with 39.9% under the age of 18, 4% from 18 to 24, 17.2% from 25 to 44, 10.7% from 45 to 64, and 4.4% who were 65 years of age or older. The median age was 27 years.

The median income for a household in the CDP was $64,583, and the median income for a family was $67,917. The per capita income for the CDP was $13,104. About 20.6% of persons were below the poverty line, 21% who were under 18, and 0% who were over 65.

== Education ==
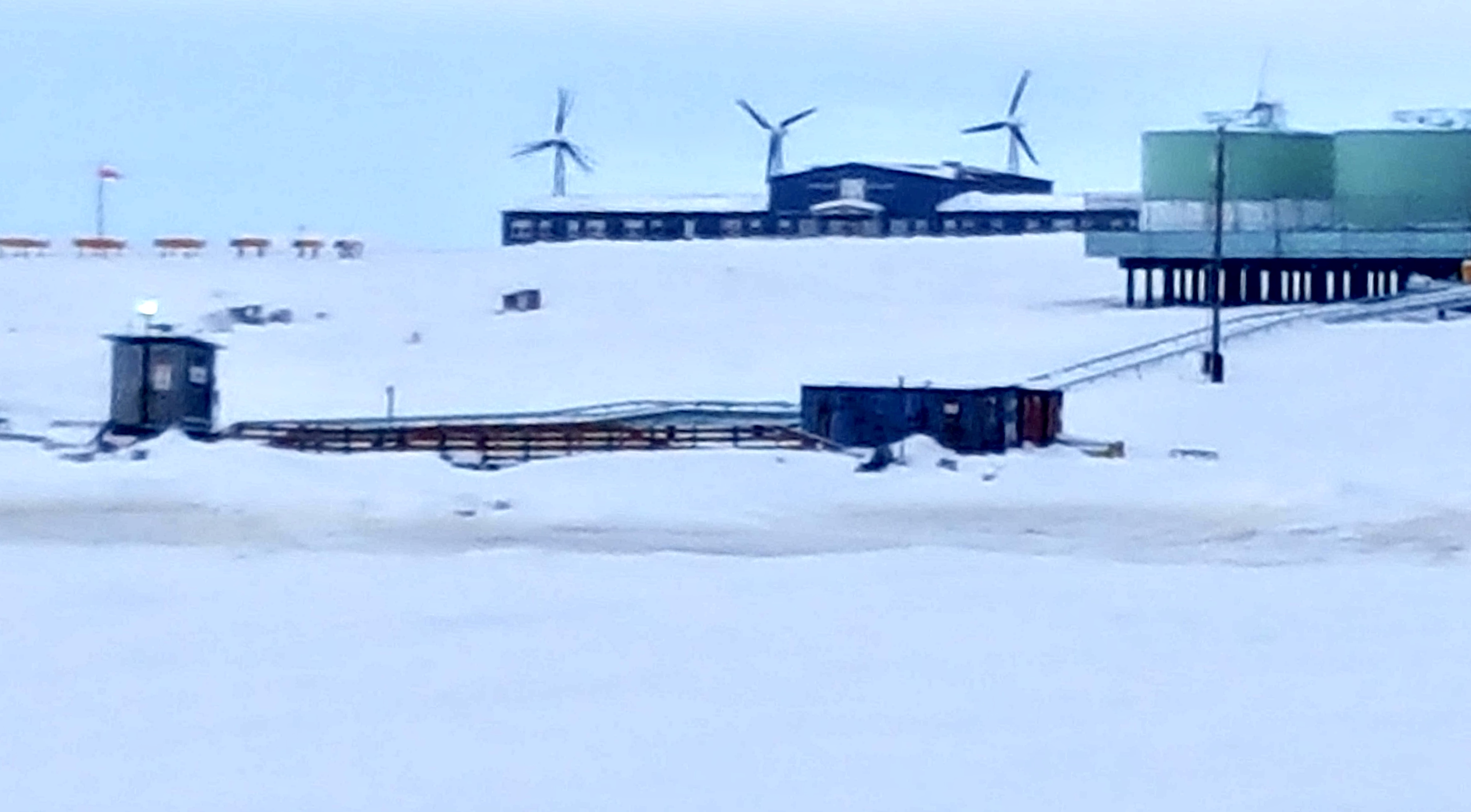
The large blue building is the Kongiganak school, portions of wind and tank farms also visible

Kongiganak is served by one school in the Lower Kuskokwim School District, Ayagina'ar Elitnaurvik. For the 2023-2024 school year, there were 177 students in pre-kindergarten through 12th grade, and 6 teachers. In 2018, it served 174 students, and in 2014 the student count was 177. The Wolverines are the school mascot.

The school is named after one of the elders in the village, who also previously had a hand in starting the village's first school.

Students in grades 6-12 can participate in cross country, NYO (Native Youth Olympics) and basketball. Some classes of 8th graders have gone on summer trips to North Dakota and Minnesota.

== Health ==
Sale, importation and possession of alcohol are banned in the village.
