= Kasigluk, Alaska =

Kasigluk Kassigluq
- Census-designated place
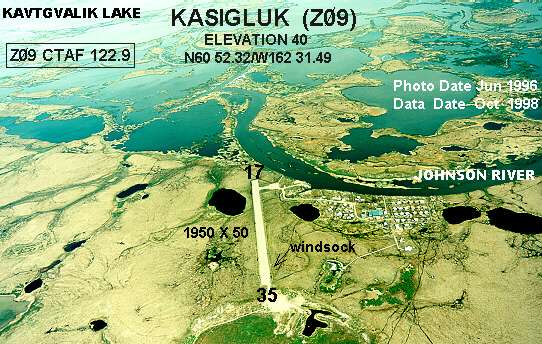
- Aerial photograph of Kasigluk

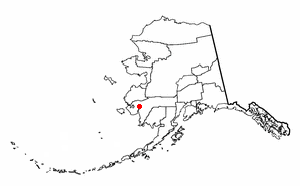
- Location of Kasigluk, Alaska
- Coordinates: 60°53′31″N 162°32′9″W
- Country: United States
- State: Alaska
- Census area: Bethel

Government
  - State senator: Lyman Hoffman (D)
  - State rep.: Conrad McCormick (D)

Area
  - Total: 12.87 sq mi (33.33 km^{2})
  - Land: 11.81 sq mi (30.58 km^{2})
  - Water: 1.06 sq mi (2.75 km^{2})

Population (2020)
  - Total: 623
  - Density: 52.8/sq mi (20.37/km^{2})
- Time zone: UTC-9 (Alaska (AKST))
  - Summer (DST): UTC-8 (AKDT)
- ZIP code: 99609
- Area code: 907
- FIPS code: 02-37975

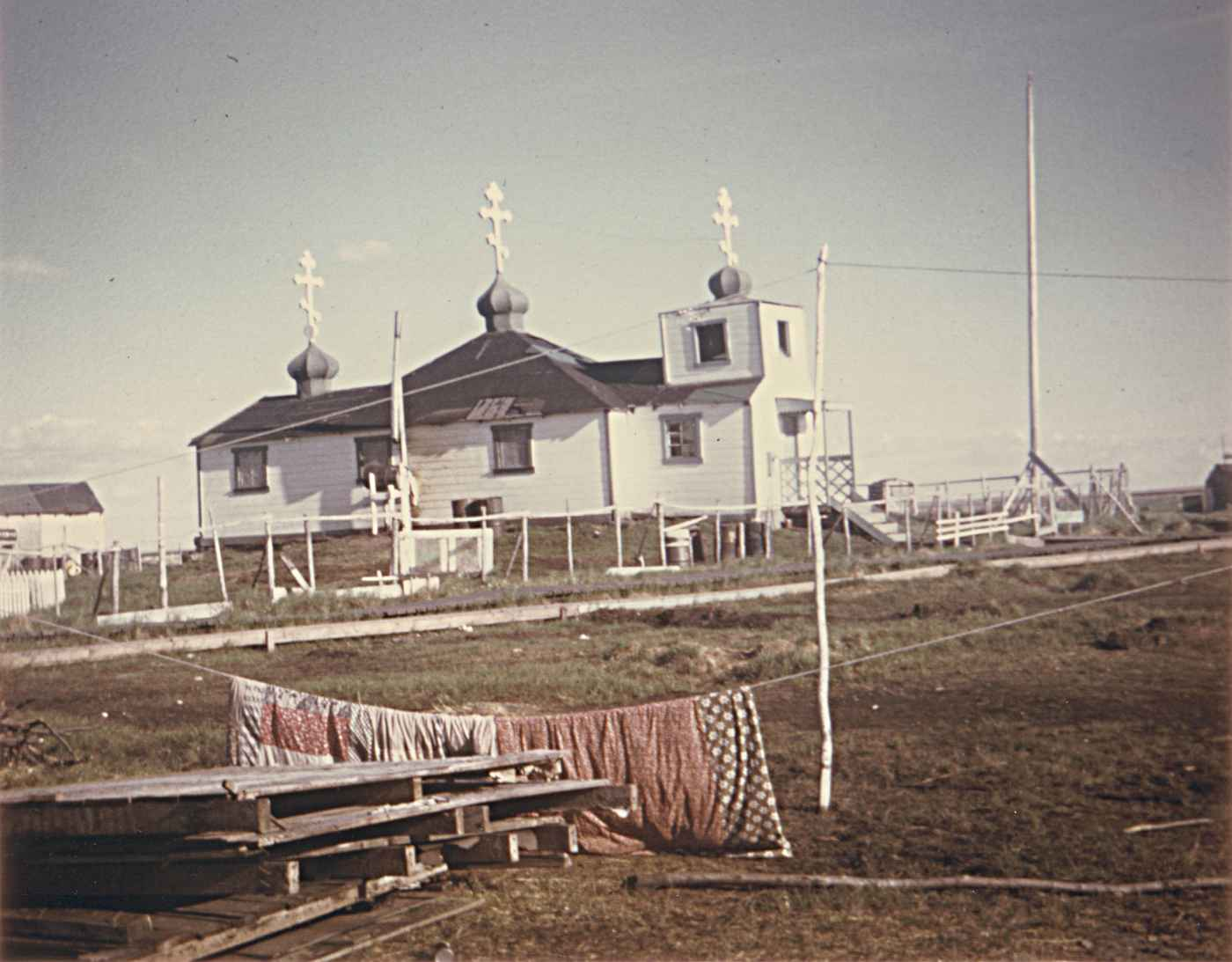
Holy Trinity Russian Orthodox Church

Kasigluk /kəˈsɪɡlʊk/ (Central Yupik: Kassigluq) is a census-designated place (CDP) in the Bethel Census Area in the U.S. state of Alaska. As of the 2020 census, Kasigluk had a population of 623. Kasigluk consists of two smaller villages, called Akiuk and Akula.

== Geography ==
Kasigluk is located at 60°53′31″N 162°32′9″W (60.892005, -162.535805) along the Johnson River in the Yukon–Kuskokwim Delta of western Alaska. It is approximately 20 miles (32 km) northwest of Bethel.

According to the United States Census Bureau, the CDP has a total area of 13.1 square miles (34.0 km^{2}), of which 12.1 square miles (31.3 km^{2}) is land and 1.0 square mile (2.7 km^{2}), or 7.94%, is water.

The village is served by the Kasigluk Airport.

== Demographics ==
Historical population
Census	Pop.	Note	%±
1940	66		—
1950	111		68.2%
1960	244		119.8%
1990	425		—
2000	543		27.8%
2010	569		4.8%
2020	623		9.5%
U.S. Decennial Census

Kasigluk was first mentioned as one of the "Tundra Villages" in the 1939 U.S. Census, with a population of 66. Kasigluk later appeared on the 1940 U.S. Census as an unincorporated native village named "Kaseglok." In 1950 and 1960, it appeared as "Kasiglook." In 1969, Kasigluk and a nearby village of Nunapitchuk merged to form the city of Akolmiut. The combined population in 1970 was 526 and in 1980 was 641. In 1982, both communities decided to dissolve Akolmiut and become separate cities again. 1990 was the first census where Kasigluk appeared with its present spelling. In 1996, Kasigluk disincorporated and was made a census-designated place effective with the 2000 census.

As of the census of 2000, there were 543 people, 101 households, and 91 families residing in the CDP. The population density was 44.5 inhabitants per square mile (17.2/km^{2}). There were 110 housing units at an average density of 9.0 per square mile (3.5/km^{2}). The racial makeup of the CDP was 3.31% White, 96.50% Native American, and 0.18% from two or more races. 0.37% of the population were Hispanic or Latino of any race.

There were 101 households, out of which 72.3% had children under the age of 18 living with them, 67.3% were married couples living together, 15.8% had a female householder with no husband present, and 9.9% were non-families. 9.9% of all households were made up of individuals, and 1.0% had someone living alone who was 65 years of age or older. The average household size was 5.38 and the average family size was 5.81.

In the CDP, the population was spread out, with 46.6% under the age of 18, 9.6% from 18 to 24, 26.3% from 25 to 44, 11.8% from 45 to 64, and 5.7% who were 65 years of age or older. The median age was 21 years. For every 100 females, there were 98.9 males. For every 100 females age 18 and over, there were 98.6 males.

The median income for a household in the CDP was $31,500, and the median income for a family was $33,750. Males had a median income of $16,667 versus $18,750 for females. The per capita income for the CDP was $7,194. About 18.9% of families and 22.8% of the population were below the poverty line, including 26.7% of those under age 18 and none of those age 65 or over.

== Wind power ==
Rural Alaska villages have traditionally relied upon diesel generators for their electrical needs. Kasigluk is one of several rural Alaska villages implementing wind power; they have three turbines, each with a capacity of 100 kilowatts. With fuel costs rising as high as $6 per gallon in mid-2005, wind power is being pursued not only for ecological reasons, but also to reduce the cost of living in impoverished communities such as Kasigluk.

== Education ==
The village has two schools operated by the Lower Kuskokwim School District:

- Kasigluk-Akula Elitnaurvik School
  - The school covers PreK-12 and is a bilingual English-Yugtun school. As of 2018 it has about 120 students.
- Kasigluk Akiuk Memorial School
  - The school covers PreK-12. As of 2018 it has about 100 students.
