= Kongiganak Airport =

Airport in Alaska

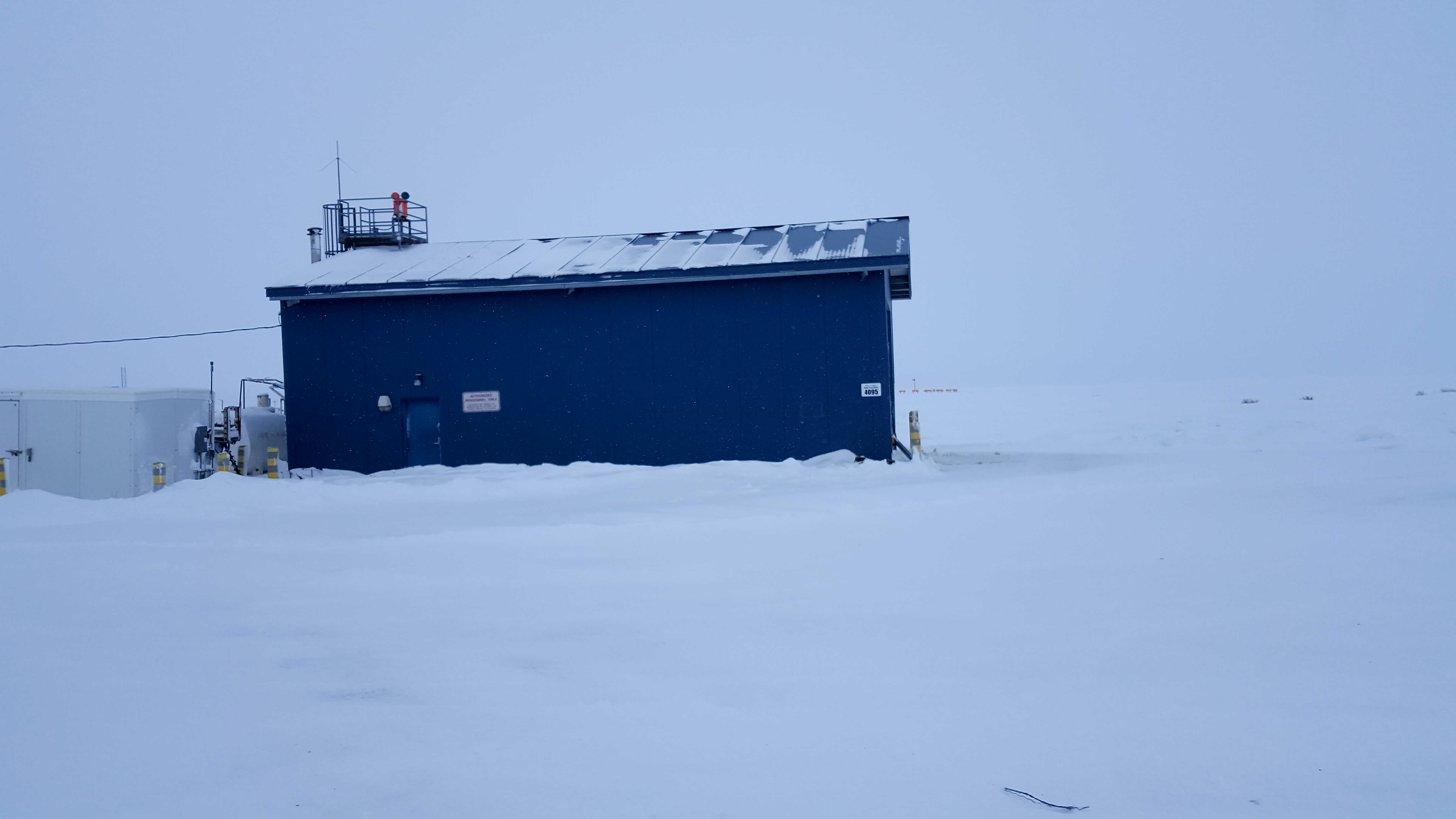
- IATA: KKH; ICAO: PADY; FAA LID: DUY

Summary
- Airport type: Public
- Owner: Alaska DOT&PF - Central Region
- Serves: Kongiganak, Alaska
- Elevation AMSL: 30 ft (9.1 m)
- Coordinates: 59°57′39″N 162°52′52″W

Map
- Location of airport in Alaska

Runways
Direction	Length		Surface
Direction	ft	m	Surface
18/36	1,885	575	Gravel

Statistics (2005)
- Aircraft operations: 1,200
- Source: Federal Aviation Administration

Kongiganak Airport (IATA: KKH, ICAO: PADY, FAA LID: DUY) is a state-owned public-use airport located adjacent to the village of Kongiganak, in the Bethel Census Area of the U.S. state of Alaska.

Although most U.S. airports use the same three-letter location identifier for the FAA and IATA, this airport is assigned DUY by the FAA and KKH by the IATA. The airport's ICAO identifier is PADY.

== Facilities and aircraft ==
Kongiganak Airport has one runway designated 18/36 with a gravel surface measuring 1,885 by 35 feet (575 x 11 m). For the 12-month period ending August 26, 2005, the airport had 1,200 general aviation aircraft operations, an average of 100 per month.

== Airlines and destinations ==
Airlines	Destinations
Grant Aviation	Bethel, Tuntutuliak

== See also ==
- List of airports in Alaska
