= Mountain Village Airport =

- IATA: MOU; ICAO: PAMO; FAA LID: MOU

Summary
- Airport type: Public
- Owner: Alaska DOT&PF - Northern Region
- Serves: Mountain Village, Alaska
- Elevation AMSL: 337 ft (103 m)
- Coordinates: 62°05′43″N 163°40′55″W

Map
- Location of airport in Alaska

Runways
Direction	Length		Surface
Direction	ft	m	Surface
2/20	3,500	1,067	Gravel
- Source: Federal Aviation Administration

Mountain Village Airport (IATA: MOU, ICAO: PAMO, FAA LID: MOU) is a public-use airport located in Mountain Village, a city in the Kusilvak Census Area of the U.S. state of Alaska. The airport is owned by the State of Alaska Department of Transportation and Public Facilities (DOT&PF) - Northern Region.

== Facilities ==
Mountain Village Airport has one runway designated 2/20 with a 3,500 x 75 ft (1,067 x 23 m) gravel surface.

== Airlines and destinations ==
Airlines	Destinations
Grant Aviation	Bethel, St. Mary's
Ryan Air	St. Mary's

=== Top destinations ===
Top ten busiest domestic routes out of MOU (July 2010 - June 2011)
Rank	City	Passengers	Carriers
1	(Alaska) Bethel, AK	3,000	Hageland
2	St. Mary's, Alaska	1,000	Hageland

== See also ==
- List of airports in Alaska
