= Platinum Airport =

- IATA: PTU; ICAO: PAPM; FAA LID: PTU

Summary
- Airport type: Public
- Owner: Alaska DOT&PF - Central Region
- Serves: Platinum, Alaska
- Elevation AMSL: 18 ft / 5 m
- Coordinates: 59°00′41″N 161°49′10″W

Map
- Location of airport in Alaska

Runways
Direction	Length		Surface
Direction	ft	m	Surface
14/32	3,300	1,006	Gravel

Statistics
- Enplanements (2008): 1,020
- Sources: Federal Aviation Administration

Platinum Airport (IATA: PTU, ICAO: PAPM, FAA LID: PTU) is a state-owned public-use airport located in Platinum, in the Bethel Census Area of the U.S. state of Alaska.

As per Federal Aviation Administration records, the airport had 1,020 passenger boardings (enplanements) in calendar year 2008, an increase of 60.9% from the 634 enplanements in 2007. This airport is included in the FAA's National Plan of Integrated Airport Systems for 2009–2013, which categorizes it as a general aviation facility.

== Facilities ==
Platinum Airport has one runway designated 14/32 with a gravel surface measuring 3,300 by 75 feet (1,006 x 23 m).

== Airlines and destinations ==
Airlines	Destinations
Tucker Aviation	Dillingham
Yute Commuter Service	Bethel

== See also ==
- List of airports in Alaska
