= Kipnuk Airport =

- IATA: KPN; ICAO: PAKI; FAA LID: IIK

Summary
- Airport type: Public
- Owner: Alaska DOT&PF - Central Region
- Serves: Kipnuk, Alaska
- Elevation AMSL: 11 ft (3.4 m)
- Coordinates: 59°55′59″N 164°01′50″W

Map
- Location of airport in Alaska

Runways
Direction	Length		Surface
Direction	ft	m	Surface
15/33	2,120	646	Gravel
- Source: Federal Aviation Administration

Kipnuk Airport (IATA: KPN, ICAO: PAKI, FAA LID: IIK) is a state-owned public-use airport serving Kipnuk, in the Bethel Census Area of the U.S. state of Alaska.

Although most U.S. airports use the same three-letter location identifier for the FAA and IATA, this airport is assigned IIK by the FAA and KPN by the IATA. The airport's ICAO identifier is PAKI.

== Facilities ==
Kipnuk Airport has one runway designated 15/33 with a gravel surface measuring 2,120 by 35 feet (646 x 11 m).

== Airlines and destinations ==
Airlines	Destinations
Grant Aviation	Bethel

=== Top destinations ===
Busiest domestic routes out of KPN (July 2010 - June 2011)
Rank	City	Passengers	Carriers
1	(Alaska) Bethel, AK	4,000	Grant, Hageland

== See also ==
- List of airports in Alaska
