= Kwigillingok, Alaska =

Kwigillingok Kuigilnguq
- CDP
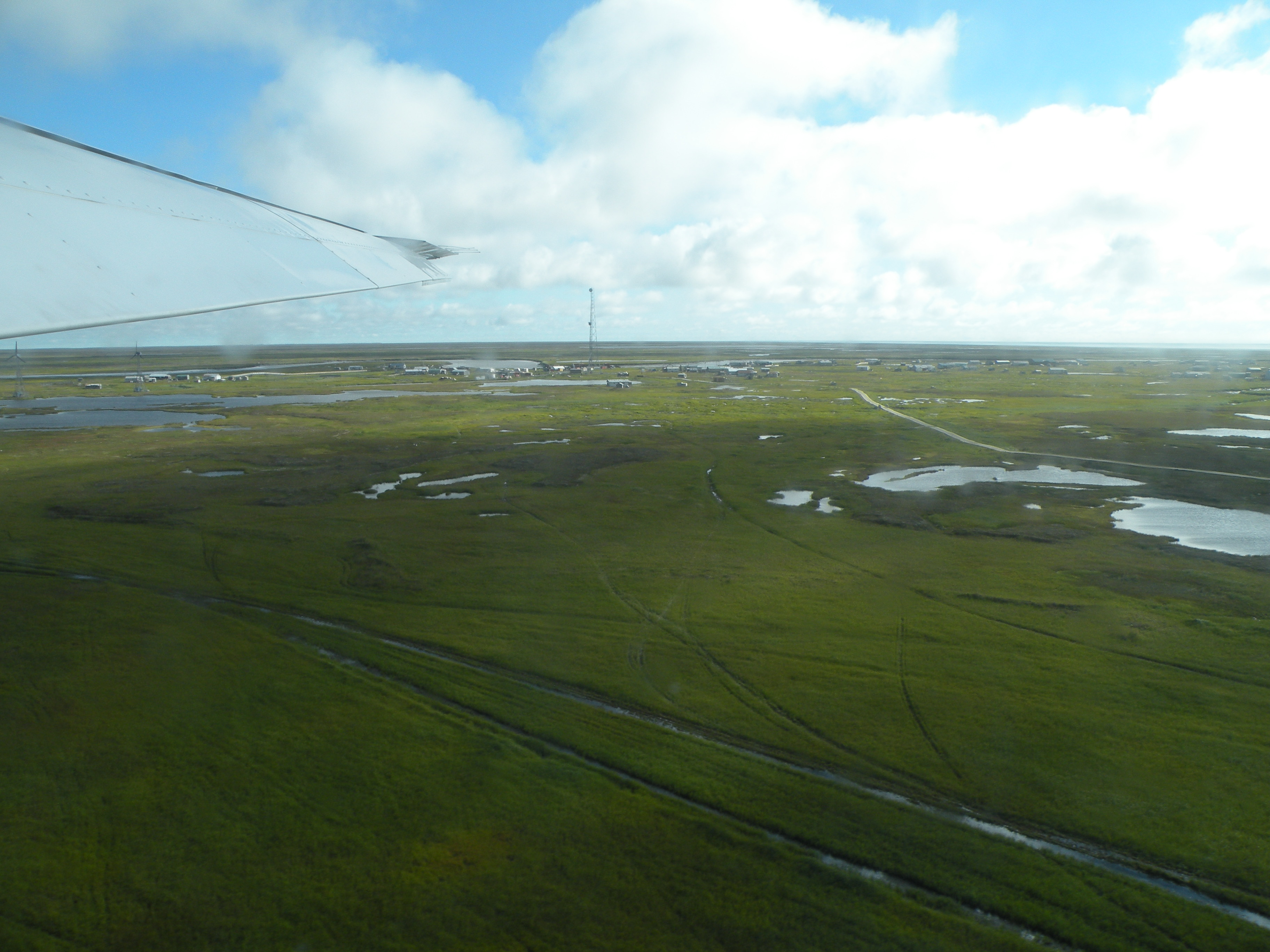
- Aerial view of Kwigillingok

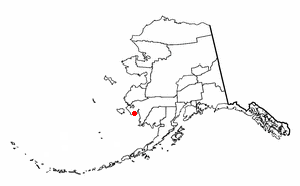
- Location of Kwigillingok, Alaska
- Coordinates: 59°52′20″N 163°9′58″W
- Country: United States
- State: Alaska
- Census Area: Bethel

Government
  - State senator: Lyman Hoffman (D)
  - State rep.: Conrad McCormick (D)

Area
  - Total: 23.83 sq mi (61.71 km^{2})
  - Land: 23.79 sq mi (61.62 km^{2})
  - Water: 0.035 sq mi (0.09 km^{2})

Population (2020)
  - Total: 380
  - Density: 16.0/sq mi (6.17/km^{2})
- Time zone: UTC-9 (Alaska (AKST))
  - Summer (DST): UTC-8 (AKDT)
- ZIP codes: 99622
- Area code: 907
- FIPS code: 02-42490

Kwigillingok (Central Yupik: Kuigilnguq) is a census-designated place (CDP) in Bethel Census Area, Alaska, United States. As of the 2020 census, Kwigillingok had a population of 380.

In 2025, remnants of Typhoon Halong, which originally made landfall in Japan, veered backwards and brought hurricane-force winds and flooding to Kwigillingok and nearby western Alaska. Many homes floated away in the flooding, at least 18 people were rescued and several people remained missing as of October 13.

== Geography ==
Kwigillingok is located at 59°52′20″N 163°09′58″W.

According to the United States Census Bureau, the CDP has a total area of 20.2 square miles (52 km^{2}), of which, 20.1 square miles (52 km^{2}) of it is land and 0.1 square miles (0.26 km^{2}) of it (0.35%) is water.

== Demographics ==
Historical population
Census	Pop.	Note	%±
1920	104		—
1940	146		—
1950	245		67.8%
1960	344		40.4%
1970	148		−57.0%
1980	354		139.2%
1990	278		−21.5%
2000	338		21.6%
2010	321		−5.0%
2020	380		18.4%
U.S. Decennial Census

Kwigillingok first appeared on the 1920 U.S. Census as Quigillingok, an unincorporated native village. It did not appear on the 1930 census, but was returned as "Quigilinook" in 1940. In 1950, the name was changed to the present spelling of Kwigillingok. It was made a census-designated place in 1980.

As of the census of 2000, there were 388 people, 96 households, and 89 families residing in the CDP. The population density was 16.8 inhabitants per square mile (6.5/km^{2}). There were 78 housing units at an average density of 3.9 per square mile (1.5/km^{2}). The racial makeup of the CDP was 97.63% Native American, 2.07% White and 0.30% from two or more races.

There were 96 households, out of which 60.3% had children under the age of 18 living with them, 74.0% were married couples living together, 8.2% had a female householder with no husband present, and 9.6% were non-families. 6.8% of all households were made up of individuals, and none had someone living alone who was 65 years of age or older. The average household size was 4.63 and the average family size was 4.89.

In the CDP, the population was spread out, with 39.9% under the age of 18, 8.9% from 18 to 24, 29.9% from 25 to 44, 14.2% from 45 to 64, and 7.1% who were 65 years of age or older. The median age was 26 years. For every 100 females, there were 131.5 males. For every 100 females age 18 and over, there were 128.1 males.

The median income for a household in the CDP was $36,250, and the median income for a family was $33,250. Males had a median income of $23,125 versus $50,625 for females. The per capita income for the CDP was $7,577. About 28.8% of families and 34.7% of the population were below the poverty line, including 46.8% of those under age 18 and none of those age 65 or over.

== Transportation ==
The Kwigillingok Airport is the only connection to the outside world, as there are no roads leading to the town. The Alaska Department of Transportation and Public Facilities was set to begin construction on the airport in the summer of 2025 to improve safety and usability.

== Education ==
It is served by the K-12 Kwigillingok School, operated by the Lower Kuskokwim School District. As of 2021, it had about 144 students.
