= St. Mary's Airport (Alaska) =

- IATA: KSM; ICAO: PASM; FAA LID: KSM

Summary
- Airport type: Public
- Operator: Alaska DOT&PF
- Location: St. Mary's, Alaska
- Elevation AMSL: 314 ft / 96 m
- Coordinates: 62°03′39″N 163°18′07″W

Map

Runways
Direction	Length		Surface
Direction	ft	m	Surface
17/35	6,008	1,831	Gravel
6/24	1,520	463	Gravel
- Source: Federal Aviation Administration

St. Mary's Airport (IATA: KSM, ICAO: PASM, FAA LID: KSM) is a public airport located four miles (6 km) west of the central business district of St. Mary's, in the Kusilvak Census Area of the U.S. state of Alaska. This airport is publicly owned by the State of Alaska Department of Transportation and Public Facilities (DOT&PF) Northern Region.

== Facilities ==
St. Mary's Airport covers an area of 3,600 acres (1,500 ha) and contains two gravel surfaced runways: 17/35 measuring 6,008 x 150 feet (1,831 x 46 m) and 6/24 measuring 1,520 x 60 feet (463 x 18 m).

== Airlines and destinations ==
Airlines	Destinations
Aleutian Airways	Anchorage
Grant Aviation	Bethel, Mountain Village
Ryan Air	Bethel, Marshall, Mountain Village, Pilot Station

=== Top destinations ===
Busiest domestic routes out of KSM (April 2024 – March 2025)
Rank	City	Passengers	Carriers
1	Bethel, AK	1,640	Grant, Ryan
2	Anchorage, AK	1,320	Ravn Alaska
3	Pilot Station, AK	90	Ryan
4	Mountain Village, AK	90	Ryan

== Accidents ==
- On November 29, 2013, a Cessna 208 Caravan operated by Era Alaska crashed 1 mile SE of the airport because of nighttime weather conditions, pilot error, and loss of situational awareness. The pilot and 3 passengers were killed out of 10 on board.

== See also ==
- List of airports in Alaska
