= Nunapitchuk Airport =

- IATA: NUP; ICAO: PPIT; FAA LID: 16A

Summary
- Airport type: Public
- Owner: State of Alaska DOT&PF
- Serves: Nunapitchuk, Alaska
- Elevation AMSL: 12 ft / 4 m
- Coordinates: 60°54′21″N 162°26′21″W

Map
- Location of airport in Alaska

Runways
Direction	Length		Surface
Direction	ft	m	Surface
18/36	2,040	622	Gravel
NE/SW	3,000	914	Water
- Source: Federal Aviation Administration

Nunapitchuk Airport (IATA: NUP, ICAO: PPIT, FAA LID: 16A) is a state-owned public-use airport located in Nunapitchuk, a city in the Bethel Census Area of the U.S. state of Alaska.

== Facilities ==
Nunapitchuk Airport has one runway designated 18/36 with a 2,040 x 60 ft (622 x 18 m) gravel surface. It also has one seaplane landing area designated NE/SW which measures 3,000 x 300 ft (914 x 91 m).

== Airlines and destinations ==
Airlines	Destinations
Grant Aviation	Bethel

== See also ==
- List of airports in Alaska
