= Yute Commuter Service =

American airline

IATA	ICAO	Call sign
K2	TUD	TUNDRA
- Founded: 2017
- AOC #: T72A272I
- Hubs: Bethel Airport
- Headquarters: Bethel, Alaska, US
- Website: YuteBethel.com

Yute Commuter Service is an American airline operating in Alaska under FAA Part 135, with their hub located at Bethel Airport. The airline, established in 2017, is the corporate successor to Flight Alaska that did business under the name Yute Air. The airline flies passengers and freight to throughout the Yukon-Kuskokwim delta.

== History ==
In November 2024 former assistant manager Nathan McCabe plead guilty to felony theft for stealing funds from the company. Yute Commuter Service also sued McCabe for more than $200,000 in damages, accusing him of running a scheme to defraud the company.

In October 2025 they helped deliver passengers and aid to Western Alaska during Typhoon Halong.

== Destinations ==
From Yute Commuter Services regularly serves the following destinations as well as more than 40 others.

- Bethel Airport
- Aniak Airport
- Saint Mary's Airport
- Russian Mission Airport
- Pilot Station Airport
- Kalskag Airport
- Mountain Village Airport

== Fleet ==
Yute Commuter Service operates a fleet of aircraft including:

- Cessna C207 Stationair
- Piper PA32R Lance
- Piper PA32 Cherokee Six
- Cessna 172 Skyhawk

== Incidents ==
On 6 February 2020, a Yute Commuter Service Piper PA-32R, flying under instrument meteorological conditions, crashed about 12 miles out of Tuntutuliak, taking the lives of the pilot and four passengers.

In November 2021, a Yute Cessna 207 caught fire on a runway at Bethel Airport.

On 15 September 2024 a Yute Commuter Service flight crashed near the city of St. Mary's, leading to the death of the pilot and three passengers.

== See also ==
- List of airlines of Alaska
