= Tununak Airport =

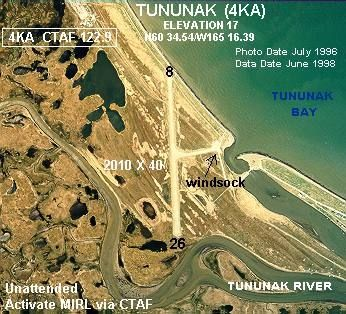
- IATA: TNK; ICAO: none; FAA LID: 4KA

Summary
- Airport type: Public
- Owner: State of Alaska DOT&PF - Central Region
- Serves: Tununak, Alaska
- Elevation AMSL: 14 ft (4.3 m)
- Coordinates: 60°34′32″N 165°16′18″W

Map
- Location of airport in Alaska

Runways
Direction	Length		Surface
Direction	ft	m	Surface
8/26	1,778	542	Gravel

Statistics
- Enplanements (2008): 1,809
- Source: Federal Aviation Administration

Tununak Airport (IATA: TNK, FAA LID: 4KA) is a state-owned, public-use airport located one nautical mile (1.85 km) southwest of the central business district of Tununak, in the Bethel Census Area of the U.S. state of Alaska.

As per Federal Aviation Administration records, this airport had 1,809 commercial passenger boardings (enplanements) in 2008, a decrease of 9.6% from the 2,001 enplanements in 2007. Tununak Airport is included in the FAA's National Plan of Integrated Airport Systems (2009–2013), which categorizes it as a general aviation facility.

In 2017, the Alaska Department of Transportation & Public Facilities issued a temporary closure of the airport due to damage to the runway.

Although most U.S. airports use the same three-letter location identifier for the FAA and IATA, this airport is assigned 4KA by the FAA and TNK by the IATA.

== Facilities ==
Tununak Airport has one runway designated 8/26 with a gravel surface measuring 1,778 by 30 feet (542 x 9 m). The airport is unattended.

Remarks:

- Surface has dips, soft spots, rocks 4-8 inches length of runway.
- 08/26 reflective markers on runway edge.
- Activate MIRL runway 08/26 - CTAF.
- Caution: runway condition not monitored; recommend visual inspection prior to using.
- Road 600' long used for landings and takeoff during strong crosswinds.
- Pilots are requested to self-announce on CTAF prior to taxiing on runway for departure; leaving the runway and within 10 NM of the airport when approaching to land.
- Windsock unreliable.

== Airlines and destinations ==
Airlines	Destinations
Grant Aviation	Bethel
Ryan Air	Bethel

== See also ==
- List of airports in Alaska
