= Nunapitchuk, Alaska =

Nunapitchuk Nunapicuar
- City
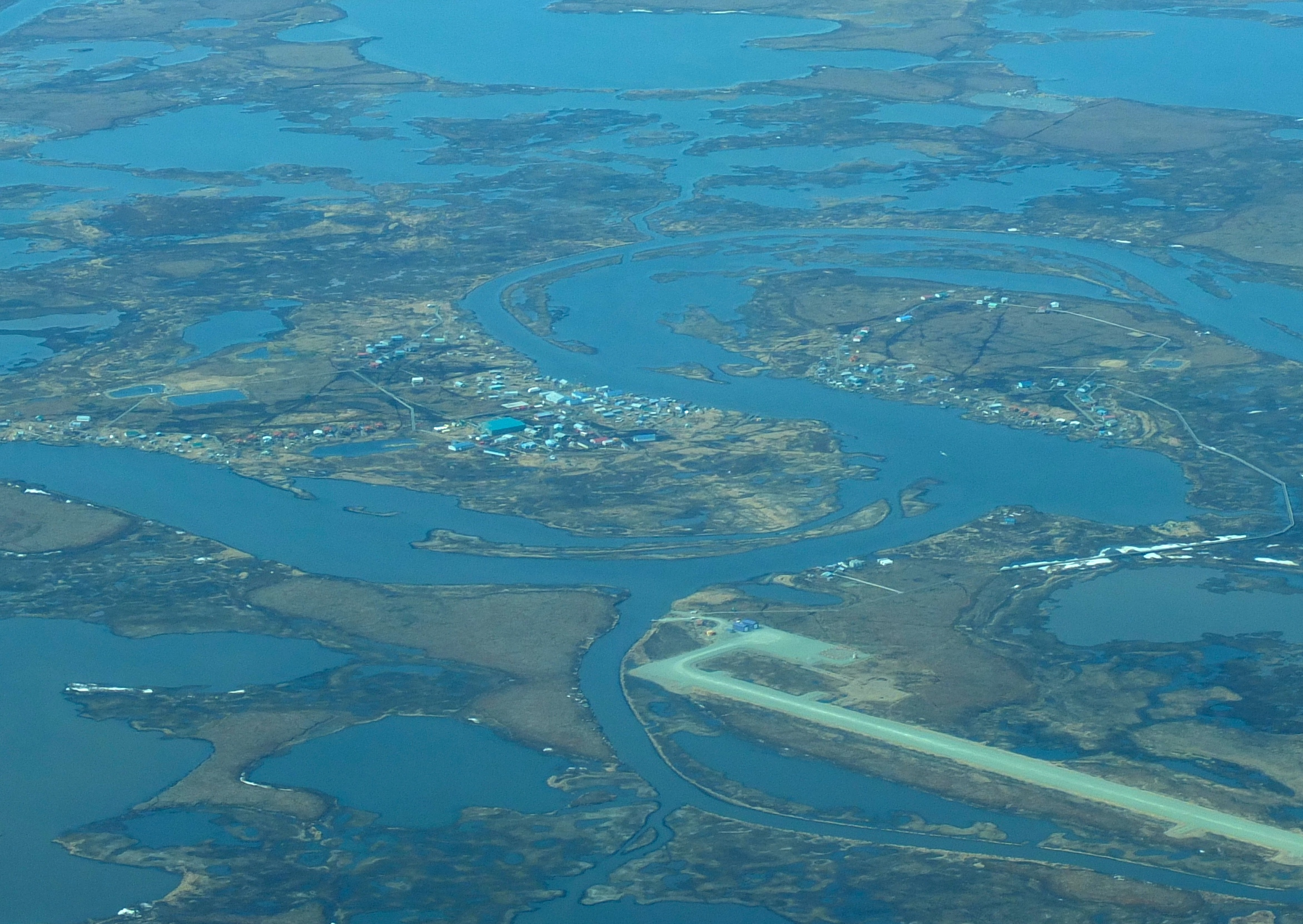
- Aerial view of Nunapitchuk in May 2014

- Location in Alaska
- Coordinates: 60°53′47″N 162°27′16″W
- Country: United States
- State: Alaska
- Census Area: Bethel
- Incorporated: August 26, 1969

Government
  - Mayor: Noah Wise
  - State senator: Lyman Hoffman (D)
  - State rep.: Conrad McCormick (D)

Area
  - Total: 7.96 sq mi (20.61 km^{2})
  - Land: 6.99 sq mi (18.11 km^{2})
  - Water: 0.97 sq mi (2.50 km^{2})
- Elevation: 9.8 ft (3 m)

Population (2020)
  - Total: 594
  - Density: 85.0/sq mi (32.81/km^{2})
- Time zone: UTC-9 (Alaska (AKST))
  - Summer (DST): UTC-8 (AKDT)
- ZIP codes: 99641
- Area code: 907
- FIPS code: 02-56680
- GNIS feature ID: 1407339

Nunapitchuk /nuːˈnɑːpɪtʃək/ (Central Yupik: Nunapicuar) is a city in Bethel Census Area, Alaska, United States. As of the 2020 census, Nunapitchuk had a population of 594.

== Geography ==
Nunapitchuk is located at 60°53′47″N 162°27′16″W (60.896352, -162.454383).

According to the United States Census Bureau, the city has a total area of 8.6 square miles (22 km^{2}), of which, 7.9 square miles (20 km^{2}) of it is land and 0.7 square miles (1.8 km^{2}) of it (8.07%) is water.

== Demographics ==
Historical population
Census	Pop.	Note	%±
1940	121		—
1950	125		3.3%
1960	327		161.6%
1990	378		—
2000	466		23.3%
2010	496		6.4%
2020	594		19.8%
U.S. Decennial Census

Nunapitchuk first appeared on the 1940 U.S. Census as the unincorporated native village of "Nunatpichuk" (apparently erroneously spelled). It was returned as Nunapitchuk in 1950 and 1960. In 1969, Nunapitchuk and the neighboring village of Kasigluk were merged to form the city of Akolmiut. (See City of Akolmiut below) In 1982, both communities decided to dissolve Akolmiut and become separate cities again. Nunapitchuk returned again beginning on the 1990 census and in every successive census to date (2010).

=== 2020 census ===
As of the 2020 census, Nunapitchuk had a population of 594. The median age was 22.9 years. 40.6% of residents were under the age of 18 and 6.9% of residents were 65 years of age or older. For every 100 females there were 109.9 males, and for every 100 females age 18 and over there were 108.9 males age 18 and over.

0.0% of residents lived in urban areas, while 100.0% lived in rural areas.

There were 131 households in Nunapitchuk, of which 58.8% had children under the age of 18 living in them. Of all households, 40.5% were married-couple households, 25.2% were households with a male householder and no spouse or partner present, and 26.0% were households with a female householder and no spouse or partner present. About 19.9% of all households were made up of individuals and 8.4% had someone living alone who was 65 years of age or older.

There were 144 housing units, of which 9.0% were vacant. The homeowner vacancy rate was 0.0% and the rental vacancy rate was 10.8%.

Racial composition as of the 2020 census
Race	Number	Percent
White	13	2.2%
Black or African American	0	0.0%
American Indian and Alaska Native	581	97.8%
Asian	0	0.0%
Native Hawaiian and Other Pacific Islander	0	0.0%
Some other race	0	0.0%
Two or more races	0	0.0%
Hispanic or Latino (of any race)	0	0.0%

=== 2000 census ===
As of the census of 2000, there were 466 people, 105 households, and 91 families residing in the city. The population density was 59.3 inhabitants per square mile (22.9/km^{2}). There were 120 housing units at an average density of 15.3 units per square mile (5.9 units/km^{2}). The racial makeup of the city was 3.43% White, 95.49% Native American, 0.43% Asian, 0.21% from other races, and 0.43% from two or more races.

There were 105 households, out of which 67.6% had children under the age of 18 living with them, 67.6% were married couples living together, 11.4% had a female householder with no husband present, and 12.4% were non-families. 10.5% of all households were made up of individuals, and 1.9% had someone living alone who was 65 years of age or older. The average household size was 4.44 and the average family size was 4.88.

In the city, the age distribution of the population shows 41.8% under the age of 18, 10.3% from 18 to 24, 27.7% from 25 to 44, 15.7% from 45 to 64, and 4.5% who were 65 years of age or older. The median age was 23 years. For every 100 females, there were 109.9 males. For every 100 females age 18 and over, there were 115.1 males.

The median income for a household in the city was $29,286, and the median income for a family was $30,313. Males had a median income of $16,250 versus $36,250 for females. The per capita income for the city was $8,364. About 14.6% of families and 20.7% of the population were below the poverty line, including 29.9% of those under age 18 and none of those age 65 or over.

== City of Akolmiut (1969-1982) ==
Historical population
Census	Pop.	Note	%±
1970	526		—
1980	641		21.9%
U.S. Decennial Census

The former city of Akolmiut was the result of the consolidation of neighboring villages of Nunapitchuk and Kasigluk incorporating into a city in 1969. After appearing on the 1970 and 1980 censuses, the communities decided to separate themselves back into two independent cities again in 1982, resuming their former names.

== Life in Nunapitchuk ==
Nunapitchuk is part of the Yukon-Kuskokwim Delta, and as such sits on swampy tundra. There are no roads to or within Nunapitchuk; buildings are connected by a network of boardwalks. The village is accessible by small aircraft, boats, and hovercraft, as weather permits.

The village's grocery and fuel needs are served by a single general store, owned and operated by the local Alaska Native Corporation, Nunapitchuk, Limited. Many locals also practice subsistence fishing and hunting.

The city regularly experiences flooding. In May 2020, historic flooding caused significant damage.

Sale, importation and possession of alcohol are banned in the village.

== Education ==
Lower Kuskokwim School District operates the Anna Tobeluk Memorial School, K-12. As of 2018 the school had 203 students, 15 certified teachers, and 16 classified employees. English is the sole language of instruction at Tobeluk.
