= Newtok Airport =

Public-use airport in Newtok, Alaska

Newtok Airport and Seaplane Base
- IATA: WWT; ICAO: PAEW; FAA LID: EWU

Summary
- Airport type: Public
- Owner: Alaska DOT&PF - Central Region
- Serves: Newtok, Alaska
- Elevation AMSL: 25 ft / 8 m
- Coordinates: 60°55′42″N 164°39′37″W

Map
- Location of airport in Alaska

Runways
Direction	Length		Surface
Direction	ft	m	Surface
15/33	2,202	671	Gravel, Partially submerged in shallow water
- Source: Federal Aviation Administration

Newtok Airport (IATA: WWT, ICAO: PAEW, FAA LID: EWU) is a state-owned public-use airport located one nautical mile (1.85 km) west of the central business district of Newtok, a village in the Bethel Census Area of the U.S. state of Alaska. There is also a nearby seaplane landing area known as Newtok Seaplane Base (FAA LID: WWT), located at 60°55′25″N 164°39′22″W on the Ninglick River.

Approximately 10 miles southeast across the water is the village of Mertarvik, AK, which is serviced by the Mertarvik Airport (FAA Code: EWU, ICAO Code: PAEW). Mertarvik Airport is a gravel runway airport approximately one mile inland from the water's edge, with a runway configuration of 12/30. The runway has a length and width of 3300x75 ft. Due to their proximity, Mertarvik (EWU) and Newtok (WWT) are often confused in online publication, but clearly delineated in the US Chart Supplements, colloquially known as the "Salmon Book" which is updated and published every 56 days. It is likely that since neither airport has a published instrument approach procedure (IAP), aircraft that land at Mertarvik Airport (EWU) will also service Newtok Airport (WWT) through visual flight rule (VFR) operations. Both Newtok Seaplane Base and Mertarvik Airport are commonly serviced by Grant Aviation who operate a fleet of Cessna Caravan C208's and fly under the verbal callsign "HOOT" and the flight plan three-letter identifier of "GUN." Both airports rarely see Instrument Flight Rule (IFR) service due to their lack of IFR approaches.

Although most U.S. airports use the same three-letter location identifier for the FAA and IATA, this airport is assigned EWU by the FAA and WWT by the IATA.

== Facilities ==
Newtok Airport has one runway designated 15/33 with a gravel surface measuring is 2,202 by 35 feet (671 x 11 m).

== Airlines and destinations ==
Airlines	Destinations
Grant Aviation	Bethel

== See also ==
- List of airports in Alaska
