= Tuntutuliak, Alaska =

Tuntutuliak Tuntutuliaq
- CDP
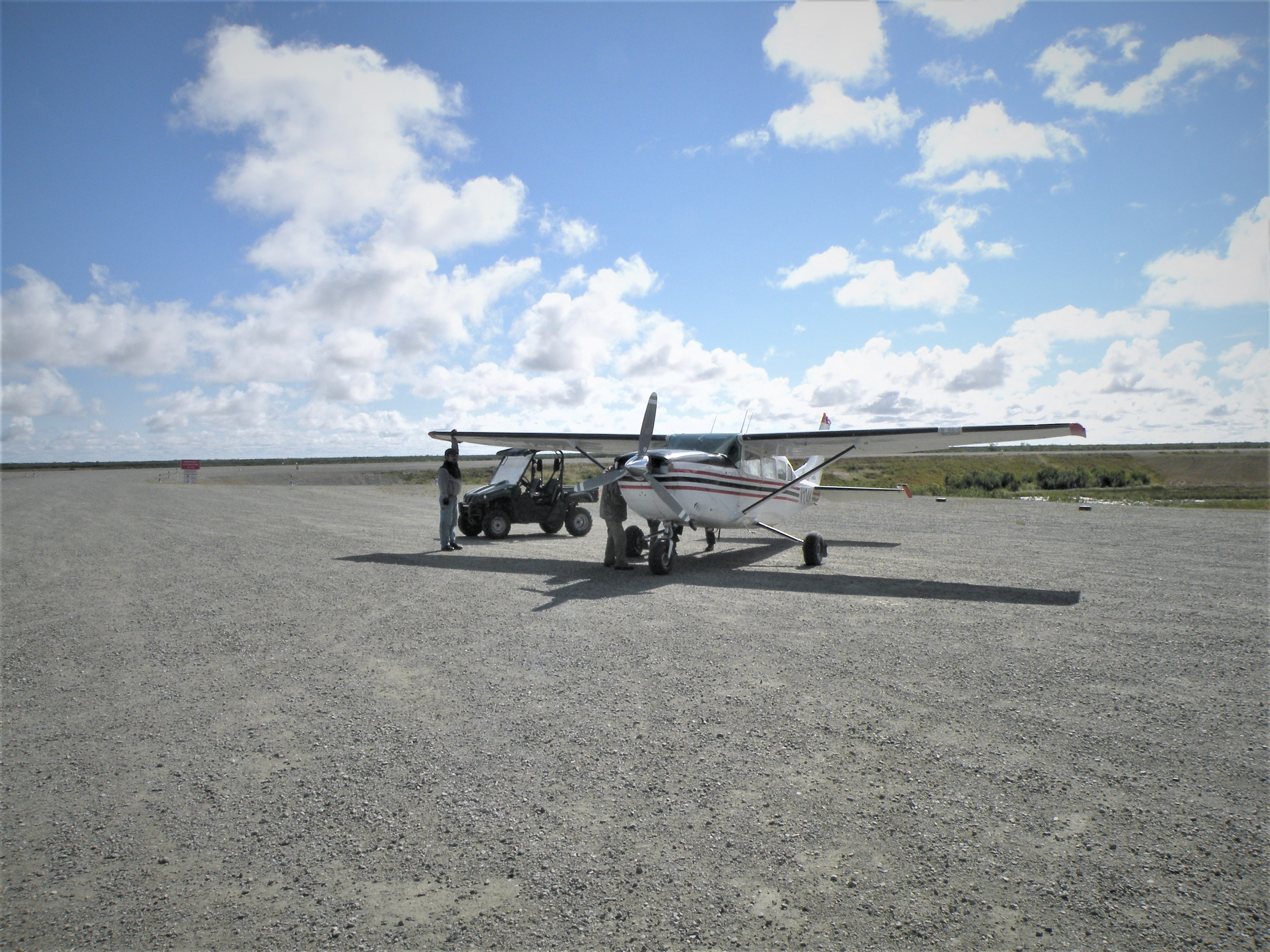
- Tuntutuliak Airport

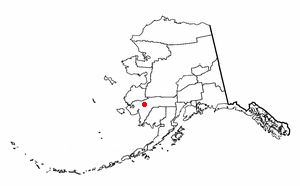
- Location of Tuntutuliak, Alaska
- Coordinates: 60°20′34″N 162°40′22″W
- Country: United States
- State: Alaska
- Census Area: Bethel

Government
  - State senator: Lyman Hoffman (D)
  - State rep.: Conrad McCormick (D)

Area
  - Total: 116.17 sq mi (300.88 km^{2})
  - Land: 115.89 sq mi (300.16 km^{2})
  - Water: 0.28 sq mi (0.72 km^{2})

Population (2020)
  - Total: 469
  - Density: 4.0/sq mi (1.56/km^{2})
- Time zone: UTC-9 (Alaska (AKST))
  - Summer (DST): UTC-8 (AKDT)
- ZIP code: 99680
- Area code: 907
- FIPS code: 02-79120

Tuntutuliak (Central Yupik: Tuntutuliaq) is a census-designated place (CDP) in Bethel Census Area, Alaska, United States. As of the 2020 census, Tuntutuliak had a population of 469.

== Geography ==
Tuntutuliak is located at 60°20′34″N 162°40′22″W (60.342643, -162.672666).

According to the United States Census Bureau, the CDP has a total area of 119.4 square miles (309 km^{2}), of which, 119.2 square miles (309 km^{2}) of it is land and 0.2 square miles (0.52 km^{2}) of it (0.13%) is water.

== Demographics ==
Historical population
Census	Pop.	Note	%±
1950	68		—
1960	144		111.8%
1970	158		9.7%
1980	216		36.7%
1990	300		38.9%
2000	370		23.3%
2010	408		10.3%
2020	469		15.0%
U.S. Decennial Census

Tuntutuliak first appeared on the 1950 U.S. Census as the unincorporated village of "Tuntatuliag." The spelling was changed to the present Tuntutuliak effective with the 1970 census. It was made a census-designated place (CDP) in 1980.

As of the census of 2000, there were 370 people, 84 households, and 74 families residing in the CDP. The population density was 3.1 people per square mile (1.2 people/km^{2}). There were 97 housing units at an average density of 0.8 units per square mile (0.31 units/km^{2}). The racial makeup of the CDP was 0.81% White, 98.92% Native American, and 0.27% from two or more races. 0.81% of the population were Hispanic or Latino of any race.

There were 84 households, out of which 54.8% had children under the age of 18 living with them, 57.1% were married couples living together, 16.7% had a female householder with no husband present, and 11.9% were non-families. 10.7% of all households were made up of individuals, and 1.2% had someone living alone who was 65 years of age or older. The average household size was 4.40 and the average family size was 4.74.

In the CDP, the population was spread out, with 42.7% under the age of 18, 11.1% from 18 to 24, 25.4% from 25 to 44, 15.4% from 45 to 64, and 5.4% who were 65 years of age or older. The median age was 23 years. For every 100 females, there were 110.2 males. For every 100 females age 18 and over, there were 109.9 males.

The median income for a household in the CDP was $25,500, and the median income for a family was $26,000. Males had a median income of $38,750 versus $18,750 for females. The per capita income for the CDP was $7,918. About 27.3% of families and 23.0% of the population were below the poverty line, including 29.1% of those under age 18 and none of those age 65 or over.

The main language spoken in the village is Yup'ik (translated to Yupiaq which means "genuine" or "real" people). This is the first language which the children are exposed to. That would make English their second language which is learned in the local school (Lewis Angapak Memorial School).

The name Tuntutuliak in the Yup'ik language means "the land of many caribou." The first settlers of the village moved to Tuntutuliak from an old village site called Qinaq. What is left of the old village is nothing but graves, and maybe a bear home at the end of the river called "Avcuamciq" which divided Qinaq in half.

The governing body of the village is called the Tuntutuliak Tribal Council. The council is also divided into several other smaller companies. Those companies are the Environmental Protection Agency, the local police department(VPOs-Village Police Officers, VPSOs-Village Public Safety Officers), and the health clinic.

== Education ==
Lower Kuskokwim School District operates Lewis Angapak Memorial School, K-12. As of 2018 the students are Yupik people.
