= Pilot Station Airport =

- IATA: none; ICAO: PAAC; FAA LID: 0AK

Summary
- Airport type: Public
- Owner: State of Alaska DOT&PF - Northern Region
- Serves: Pilot Station, Alaska
- Elevation AMSL: 473 ft (144 m)
- Coordinates: 61°57′41″N 162°56′32″W

Map
- Location of airport in Alaska

Runways
Direction	Length		Surface
Direction	ft	m	Surface
4/22	4,000	1,219	Gravel
- Source: Federal Aviation Administration

Pilot Station Airport (ICAO: PAAC, FAA LID: 0AK) is a state-owned public-use airport located three nautical mile (4.8 km) northwest of the central business district of Pilot Station, a city in the Kusilvak Census Area of the U.S. state of Alaska.

== Facilities and aircraft ==
Pilot Station Airport, at an elevation of 473 feet (144 m) above mean sea level, has one runway designated 04/22 with a 4,000 x 75 ft (1,219 x 23 m) gravel surface.

== Airlines and non-stop destinations ==
=== Passenger ===
Airlines	Destinations
Grant Aviation	Bethel, Marshall

== See also ==
- List of airports in Alaska
