= Tuntutuliak Airport =

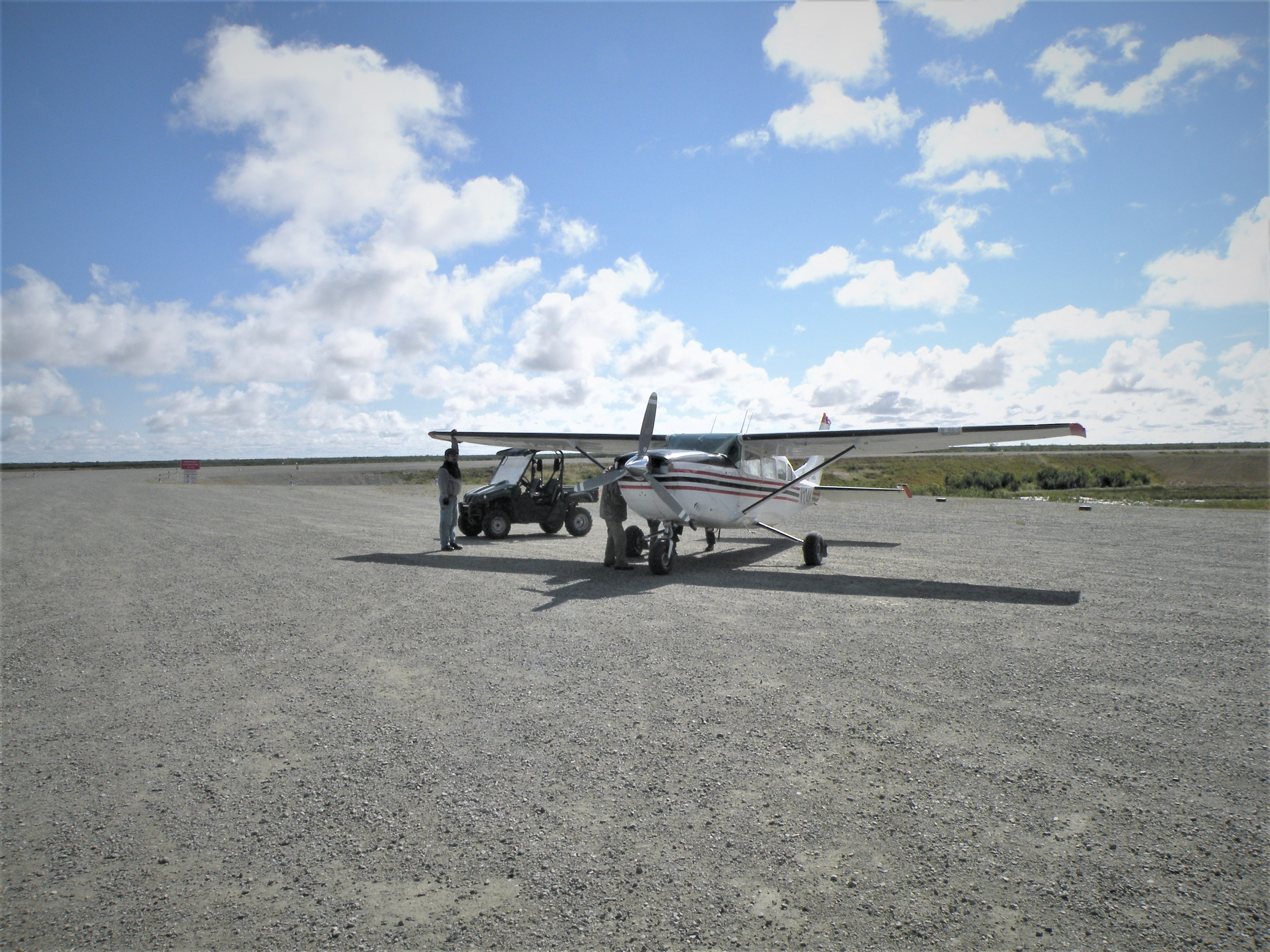
- IATA: WTL; ICAO: PAAJ; FAA LID: A61

Summary
- Airport type: Public
- Owner: Alaska DOT&PF - Central Region
- Serves: Tuntutuliak, Alaska
- Elevation AMSL: 16 ft (4.9 m)
- Coordinates: 60°20′07″N 162°40′01″W

Map
- Location of airport in Alaska

Runways
Direction	Length		Surface
Direction	ft	m	Surface
2/20	3,025	922	Gravel

Statistics (2008)
- Aircraft operations: 390
- Source: Federal Aviation Administration

Tuntutuliak Airport (IATA: WTL, ICAO: PAAJ, FAA LID: A61) is an airport situated in the US. It is a state-owned public-use airport located one nautical mile (1.85 km) south of the central business district of Tuntutuliak, in the Bethel Census Area of the U.S. state of Alaska.

== Facilities and aircraft ==
Tuntutuliak Airport has one runway designated 2/20 with a gravel surface measuring 3,005 by 75 feet (915 x 23 m). For the 12-month period ending August 26, 2008, the airport had 390 aircraft operations, an average of 32 per month: 87% air taxi and 13% general aviation.

== Airlines and destinations ==
Airlines	Destinations
Grant Aviation	Bethel

== See also ==
- List of airports in Alaska
