= Kipnuk, Alaska =

Kipnuk, Alaska Qipneq
- CDP
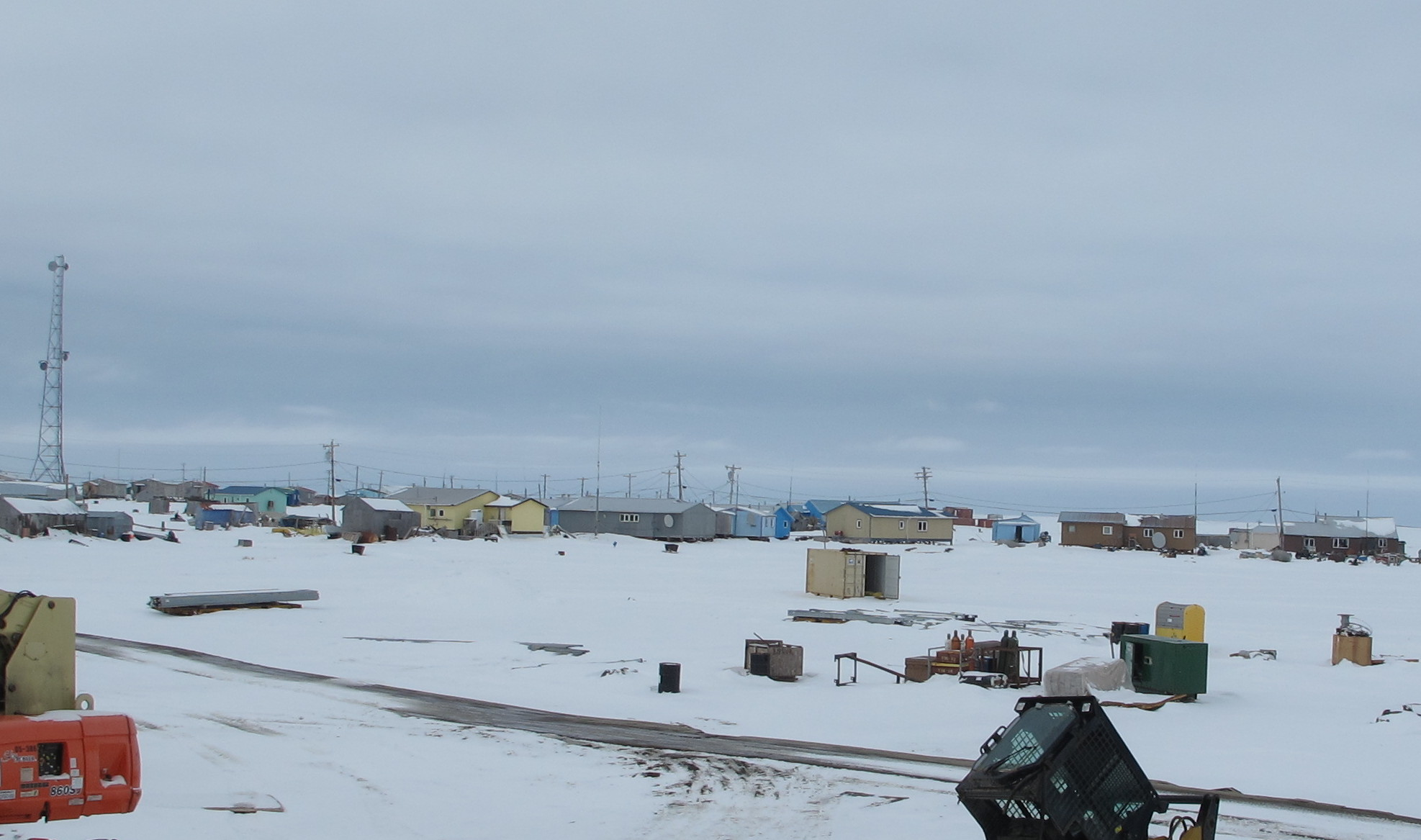
- Houses in Kipnuk

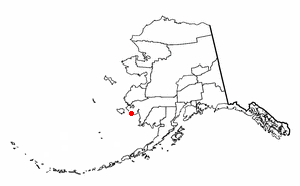
- Location of Kipnuk, Alaska
- Coordinates: 59°56′15″N 164°2′38″W
- Country: United States
- State: Alaska
- Census Area: Bethel
- Established: 1968

Government
  - State senator: Lyman Hoffman (D)
  - State rep.: Nellie Jimmie (D)

Area
  - Total: 20.57 sq mi (53.28 km^{2})
  - Land: 20.26 sq mi (52.48 km^{2})
  - Water: 0.31 sq mi (0.80 km^{2})
- Elevation: 11 ft (3.4 m)

Population (2020)
  - Total: 704
  - Density: 34.7/sq mi (13.41/km^{2})
- Time zone: UTC-9 (Alaska (AKST))
  - Summer (DST): UTC-8 (AKDT)
- ZIP code: 99614
- Area code: 907
- FIPS code: 02-39740

Kipnuk (Central Yupik: Qipneq) is a census-designated place (CDP) in Bethel Census Area, Alaska, United States. As of the 2020 census, Kipnuk had a population of 704.

Kipnuk consists mostly of Yup'ik speaking Native Alaskans; the name means a "bend" referring to the bend in the (Qukaqliq) Kugkaktlik River where it is situated. The original settlement was situated along "Nukallpiarcunarli", a slough feeding into the (Qukaqliq) Kugkaktlik. This slough was thus named, because it was hard to detect. It was ideal for ambushing "Nukallpiaqs" or warrior/providers.

== History ==
In October 2025, the low-lying town was severely damaged by the remnants of Typhoon Halong which caused flooding from ocean.

== Geography ==
Kipnuk is located at 59°56′15″N 164°2′38″W (59.937619, -164.043926).

According to the United States Census Bureau, the CDP has a total area of 19.6 square miles (51 km^{2}), of which, 19.4 square miles (50 km^{2}) of it is land and 0.2 square miles (0.52 km^{2}) of it (1.22%) is water.

Kipnuk is served by Kipnuk Airport.

== Demographics ==
Historical population
| Census | Pop. | Note | %± |
|---|---|---|---|
| 1940 | 144 | | — |
| 1950 | 185 | | 28.5% |
| 1960 | 221 | | 19.5% |
| 1970 | 325 | | 47.1% |
| 1980 | 371 | | 14.2% |
| 1990 | 470 | | 26.7% |
| 2000 | 644 | | 37.0% |
| 2010 | 639 | | −0.8% |
| 2020 | 704 | | 10.2% |
U.S. Decennial Census

Kipnuk first appeared on the 1940 U.S. Census as an unincorporated Native village. It was made a census-designated place (CDP) as of the 1980 census.

As of the census of 2000, there were 644 people, 137 households, and 122 families residing in the CDP. The population density was 33.2 inhabitants per square mile (12.8/km^{2}). There were 154 housing units at an average density of 7.9 per square mile (3.1/km^{2}). The racial makeup of the CDP was 96.58% Native American, 1.40% from two or more races, and 2.02% white.

There were 137 households, out of which 64.2% had children under the age of 18 living with them, 65.7% were married couples living together, 14.6% had a female householder with no husband present, and 10.9% were non-families. 10.2% of all households were made up of individuals, and 2.9% had someone living alone who was 65 years of age or older. The average household size was 4.70 and the average family size was 5.04.

In the CDP, the population was spread out, with 45.3% under the age of 18, 10.6% from 18 to 24, 25.9% from 25 to 44, 13.2% from 45 to 64, and 5.0% who were 65 years of age or older. The median age was 21 years. For every 100 females, there were 130.0 males. For every 100 females age 18 and over, there were 120.0 males.

The median income for a household in the CDP was $34,375, and the median income for a family was $35,714. Males had a median income of $29,167 versus $23,333 for females. The per capita income for the CDP was $8,589. About 21.5% of families and 20.9% of the population were below the poverty line, including 26.7% of those under age 18 and 19.2% of those age 65 or over.

== Education ==
Kipnuk has one school which is K-12 Chief Paul Memorial School, operated by the Lower Kuskokwim School District. As of 2018 it had 190 students.
