= Conrad McCormick =

American politician

Member of the Alaska House of Representatives from the 38th district
- In office January 17, 2023 – January 21, 2025
- Preceded by: Tiffany Zulkosky
- Succeeded by: Nellie Jimmie

Personal details
- Born: Bethel, Alaska, U.S.
- Party: Democratic

Conrad McCormick is an American politician from Alaska who served as a member of the Alaska House of Representatives for district 38 from 2023 to 2025. A Democrat, he was previously vice mayor and member of the Bethel City Council. He ran unopposed except for write-in candidates in the 2022 Alaska House of Representatives election. McCormick and three other members of the Bush Caucus were part of a coalition with Republicans in the state house.

== Electoral history ==
=== 2024 ===
==== Primary ====
2024 Nonpartisan primary
Party	Candidate	Votes	%
Democratic	Nellie "Unangiq" Jimmie	660	43.8
Democratic	Conrad McCormick (incumbent)	426	28.3
Veterans of Alaska	Willy Keppel	309	20.5
Democratic	Victoria Sosa	111	7.4
Total votes		1,506	100.0

==== General ====
Alaska House of Representatives General election, district 38
Party	Candidate	First Choice		Round 1			Round 2			Round 3	
Party	Candidate	Votes	%	Votes	%	Transfer	Votes	%	Transfer	Votes	%
Democratic	Nellie "Unangiq" Jimmie	1,380	36.7%	1,295	36.2%	+56	1,351	38.5%	+197	1,548	52.3%
Democratic	Conrad McCormick (incumbent)	1,212	32.2%	1,166	32.6%	+34	1,200	34.2%	+211	1,411	47.7%
Veterans of Alaska	Willy Keppel	971	25.8%	932	26.1%	+27	959	27.3%	-959	Eliminated	
Democratic	Victoria Sosa	187	5.0%	184	5.1%	-184	Eliminated				
Write-in		13	0.4%	Eliminated							
Total votes		3,763		3,577			3,510			2,959	
Blank or inactive ballots				130		+67	197		+551	748	
