= List of airports by ICAO code: P =

List of airports by ICAO code: A - B - C - D - EB-EG - EH-EY - FA-FM - FN-FZ - G - H - ~~I~~ - J - KA-KH - KI-KP - KR-KZ - LA-LJ - LK-LZ - M - N - O - P - Q - R - S - T - U - V - W - ~~X~~ - Y - Z

== PA, PF, PO and PP - Alaska ==
Also see airport category and list.

ICAO	IATA	Airport name	Community	Coordinates	Notes
PAAB	ATT	Atmautluak Airport	Atmautluak, Alaska	60°52′00″N 162°16′23″W	
PAAC	PQS	Pilot Station Airport	Pilot Station, Alaska	61°57′41″N 162°56′32″W	
PAAD		Point Thompson Airstrip	Deadhorse, Alaska	70°08′10″N 146°17′24″W	
PAAE	KOZ	Ouzinkie Airport	Ouzinkie, Alaska	57°56′32″N 152°27′54″W	
PAAF	MNT	Minto Al Wright Airport	Minto, Alaska	65°08′53″N 149°22′07″W	
PAAG		Chandalar Shelf Airport	Chandalar Camp, Alaska	68°03′56″N 149°34′47″W	
PAAH		Kantishna Airport	Kantishna, Alaska	63°32′30″N 150°59′38″W	
PAAI	KLL	Levelock Airport	Levelock, Alaska	59°07′41″N 156°51′31″W	
PAAJ	WTL	Tuntutuliak Airport	Tuntutuliak, Alaska	60°20′07″N 162°40′01″W	
PAAK	AKB	Atka Airport	Atka, Alaska	52°13′14″N 174°12′22″W	
PAAL	PML	Port Moller Airport	Cold Bay, Alaska	56°00′22″N 160°33′39″W	
PAAM		Driftwood Bay Air Force Station Airfield	Dutch Harbor, Alaska	53°58′19″N 166°51′27″W	
PAAN		Gold King Creek Airport	Fairbanks, Alaska	64°11′53″N 147°55′43″W	
PAAO		Lake Louise Airport	Lake Louise, Alaska	62°17′37″N 146°34′46″W	
PAAP	PTD	Port Alexander Seaplane Base	Port Alexander, Alaska	56°14′49″N 134°38′53″W	
PAAQ	PAQ	Palmer Municipal Airport	Palmer, Alaska	61°35′42″N 149°05′19″W	
PAAR	KBC	Birch Creek Airport	Birch Creek, Alaska	66°16′26″N 145°49′27″W	
PAAS	WBB	Stebbins Airport	Stebbins, Alaska	63°30′57″N 162°16′41″W	
PAAT	ATU	Casco Cove Coast Guard Station	Attu Island, Alaska	52°49′57″N 173°10′32″E	
PAAU	SXP	Sheldon Point Airport	Nunam Iqua, Alaska	62°31′14″N 164°50′52″W	
PAAV	KEK	Ekwok Airport	Ekwok, Alaska	59°21′17″N 157°28′20″W	
PAAW	KEB	Nanwalek Airport	Nanwalek, Alaska	59°21′04″N 151°55′34″W	
PAAX	CXC	Chitina Airport	Chitina, Alaska	61°34′58″N 144°25′41″W	
PAAY	CKX	Chicken Airport	Chicken, Alaska	64°04′17″N 141°57′08″W	
PABA	BTI	Barter Island LRRS Airport (Kaktovik Airport)	Barter Island, Alaska	70°08′02″N 143°34′55″W	
PABE	BET	Bethel Airport	Bethel, Alaska	60°46′43″N 161°50′14″W	
PABG	BVU	Beluga Airport	Beluga, Alaska	61°10′23″N 151°02′43″W	
PABI	BIG	Allen Army Airfield (formerly Big Delta Army Airfield)	Fort Greely / Delta Junction, Alaska	63°59′43″N 145°43′12″W	
PABL	BKC	Buckland Airport	Buckland, Alaska	65°58′54″N 161°08′57″W	
PABM	BMX	Big Mountain Air Force Station	Big Mountain, Alaska	59°21′44″N 155°15′32″W	
PABN		Devils Mountain Lodge Airport	Nabesna, Alaska	62°24′07″N 142°59′44″W	
PABP		Badami Airport	Deadhorse, Alaska	70°08′15″N 147°01′50″W	
PABR	BRW	Wiley Post–Will Rogers Memorial Airport	Barrow, Alaska	71°17′08″N 156°45′58″W	
PABT	BTT	Bettles Airport	Bettles, Alaska	66°54′50″N 151°31′45″W	
PABU	BTI	Bullen Point Short Range Radar Site	Kaktovik, Alaska	70°10′35″N 146°51′18″W	Closed
PABV		Birchwood Airport	Birchwood, Alaska	61°24′58″N 149°30′30″W	
PACA	CSP	Cape Spencer Coast Guard Heliport	Cape Spencer, Alaska	58°11′57″N 136°38′24″W	
PACD	CDB	Cold Bay Airport	Cold Bay, Alaska	55°12′19″N 162°43′28″W	
PACE	CEM	Central Airport	Central, Alaska	65°34′26″N 144°46′51″W	
PACH	CHU	Chuathbaluk Airport	Chuathbaluk, Alaska	61°34′45″N 159°12′56″W	
PACI	CIK	Chalkyitsik Airport	Chalkyitsik, Alaska	66°38′42″N 143°44′24″W	
PACJ	CKD	Crooked Creek Airport	Crooked Creek, Alaska	61°52′04″N 158°08′06″W	
PACK	CYF	Chefornak Airport	Chefornak, Alaska	60°08′57″N 164°17′08″W	
PACL		Clear Airport / Clear Space Force Station	Clear, Alaska	64°18′04″N 149°07′13″W	
PACM	SCM	Scammon Bay Airport	Scammon Bay, Alaska	61°50′43″N 165°34′17″W	
PACR	IRC	Circle City Airport	Circle, Alaska	65°49′40″N 144°04′34″W	
PACS		Cape Sarichef Airport	Unimak Island	54°35′04″N 164°54′21″W	
PACV	CDV	Merle K. (Mudhole) Smith Airport	Cordova, Alaska	60°29′30″N 145°28′39″W	
PACX	CXF	Coldfoot Airport	Coldfoot, Alaska	67°15′08″N 150°12′14″W	
PACY	CYT	Yakataga Airport	Yakataga, Alaska	60°04′51″N 142°29′44″W	
PACZ	CZF	Cape Romanzof LRRS Airport	Cape Romanzof, Alaska	61°46′55″N 166°02′13″W	
PADE	DRG	Deering Airport	Deering, Alaska	66°04′10″N 162°45′59″W	
PADG	RDB	Red Dog Airport	Red Dog Mine, Alaska	68°01′56″N 162°53′57″W	
PADK	ADK	Adak Airport (Mitchell Field)	Adak Island, Alaska	51°52′41″N 176°38′46″W	
PADL	DLG	Dillingham Airport	Dillingham, Alaska	59°02′41″N 158°30′20″W	
PADM	MLL	Marshall Don Hunter Sr. Airport	Marshall, Alaska	61°51′51″N 162°01′34″W	
PADQ	ADQ	Kodiak Airport (Benny Benson State Airport)	Kodiak, Alaska	57°44′59″N 152°29′38″W	
PADT		Duffy's Tavern Airport	Slana, Alaska	62°43′29″N 143°55′14″W	
PADU	DUT	Unalaska Airport (Tom Madsen/Dutch Harbor Airport)	Unalaska, Alaska	53°53′56″N 166°32′42″W	
PADY	KKH	Kongiganak Airport	Kongiganak, Alaska	59°57′39″N 162°52′52″W	
PAED	EDF	Elmendorf Air Force Base	Anchorage, Alaska	61°15′10″N 149°47′36″W	
PAEE	EEK	Eek Airport	Eek, Alaska	60°12′49″N 162°02′38″W	
PAEG	EAA	Eagle Airport	Eagle, Alaska	64°46′41″N 141°08′59″W	
PAEH	EHM	Cape Newenham LRRS Airport	Cape Newenham, Alaska	58°38′47″N 162°03′46″W	
PAEI	EIL	Eielson Air Force Base	Fairbanks, Alaska	64°39′56″N 147°06′05″W	
PAEL	ELV	Elfin Cove Seaplane Base	Elfin Cove, Alaska	58°11′43″N 136°20′51″W	
PAEM	EMK	Emmonak Airport	Emmonak, Alaska	62°47′10″N 164°29′27″W	
PAEN	ENA	Kenai Municipal Airport	Kenai, Alaska	60°34′24″N 151°14′41″W	
PAEW	WWT	Newtok Airport	Newtok, Alaska	60°55′42″N 164°39′37″W	
PAFA	FAI	Fairbanks International Airport	Fairbanks, Alaska	64°48′54″N 147°51′23″W	
PAFB	FBK	Ladd Army Airfield (Fort Wainwright AAF)	Fairbanks, Alaska / Fort Wainwright	64°50′15″N 147°36′52″W	
PAFE	KAE	Kake Airport	Kake, Alaska	56°57′41″N 133°54′37″W	
PAFK		Farewell Lake Seaplane Base	Farewell Lake, Alaska	62°32′33″N 153°37′21″W	
PAFL		Tin Creek Airport	Farewell Lake, Alaska	62°31′56″N 153°36′46″W	
PAFM	ABL	Ambler Airport	Ambler, Alaska	67°06′24″N 157°51′26″W	
PAFR	FRN	Bryant Army Heliport	Fort Richardson	61°15′45″N 149°39′17″W	
PAFS	NIB	Nikolai Airport	Nikolai, Alaska	63°01′07″N 154°21′30″W	
PAFV	FMC	Five Mile Airport	Five Mile, Alaska	65°55′37″N 149°50′24″W	
PAFW	FWL	Farewell Airport	Farewell, Alaska	62°30′33″N 153°53′25″W	
PAGA	GAL	Edward G. Pitka Sr. Airport	Galena, Alaska	64°44′10″N 156°56′15″W	
PAGB	GBH	Galbraith Lake Airport	Galbraith Lake, Alaska	68°28′47″N 149°29′24″W	
PAGG		Kwigillingok Airport	Kwigillingok, Alaska	59°52′35″N 163°10′07″W	
PAGH	SHG	Shungnak Airport	Shungnak, Alaska	66°53′17″N 157°09′45″W	
PAGK	GKN	Gulkana Airport	Gulkana, Alaska	62°09′18″N 145°27′16″W	
PAGL	GLV	Golovin Airport	Golovin, Alaska	64°33′02″N 163°00′26″W	
PAGM	GAM	Gambell Airport	Gambell, Alaska	63°46′00″N 171°43′58″W	
PAGN	AGN	Angoon Seaplane Base	Angoon, Alaska	57°30′13″N 134°35′06″W	
PAGQ	BGQ	Big Lake Airport	Big Lake, Alaska	61°32′10″N 149°48′50″W	
PAGS	GST	Gustavus Airport	Gustavus, Alaska	58°25′37″N 135°42′23″W	
PAGT	NME	Nightmute Airport	Nightmute, Alaska	60°28′16″N 164°42′03″W	
PAGX	KGX	Grayling Airport	Grayling, Alaska	62°53′40″N 160°03′54″W	
PAGY	SGY	Skagway Airport	Skagway, Alaska	59°27′36″N 135°18′56″W	
PAGZ	GMT	Granite Mountain Air Station	Granite Mountain, Alaska	65°24′08″N 161°16′53″W	
PAHC	HCR	Holy Cross Airport	Holy Cross, Alaska	62°11′18″N 159°46′30″W	
PAHE		Tahneta Pass Airport	Tahneta Pass Lodge	61°54′05″N 147°18′16″W	Closed
PAHL	HSL	Huslia Airport	Huslia, Alaska	65°42′07″N 156°23′14″W	
PAHN	HNS	Haines Airport	Haines, Alaska	59°14′38″N 135°31′25″W	
PAHO	HOM	Homer Airport	Homer, Alaska	59°38′44″N 151°28′36″W	
PAHP	HPB	Hooper Bay Airport	Hooper Bay, Alaska	61°31′26″N 166°08′48″W	
PAHU	HUS	Hughes Airport	Hughes, Alaska	66°02′21″N 154°15′53″W	
PAHV		Healy River Airport	Healy, Alaska	63°52′03″N 148°58′08″W	
PAHX	SHX	Shageluk Airport	Shageluk, Alaska	62°41′32″N 159°34′09″W	
PAHY	HYG	Hydaburg Seaplane Base	Hydaburg, Alaska	55°12′23″N 132°49′42″W	
PAIG	IGG	Igiugig Airport	Igiugig, Alaska	59°19′27″N 155°54′06″W	
PAII	EGX	Egegik Airport	Egegik, Alaska	58°11′08″N 157°22′32″W	
PAIK	IAN	Bob Baker Memorial Airport	Kiana, Alaska	66°58′33″N 160°26′12″W	
PAIL	ILI	Iliamna Airport	Iliamna, Alaska	59°45′14″N 154°54′39″W	
PAIM	UTO	Indian Mountain LRRS Airport	Indian Mountain Air Force Station	65°59′34″N 153°42′14″W	
PAIN	MCL	McKinley National Park Airport	McKinley Park, Alaska	63°43′59″N 148°54′40″W	
PAIW	WAA	Wales Airport	Wales, Alaska	65°37′21″N 168°05′42″W	
PAJC		Chignik Airport	Chignik, Alaska	56°18′41″N 158°22′24″W	
PAJJ	TKE	Tenakee Seaplane Base	Tenakee Springs, Alaska	57°46′47″N 135°13′06″W	
PAJN	JNU	Juneau International Airport	Juneau, Alaska	58°21′18″N 134°34′35″W	
PAJO		Johnstone Point Airport	Hinchinbrook Island, Alaska	60°28′54″N 146°35′03″W	
PAJV		Jonesville Mine Airport	Sutton, Alaska	61°43′55″N 148°55′34″W	Closed
PAJZ	KGK	Koliganek Airport	Koliganek, Alaska	59°43′36″N 157°15′34″W	
PAKA	TEK	Tatitlek Airport	Tatitlek, Alaska	60°52′21″N 146°41′28″W	
PAKC	KCC	Coffman Cove Seaplane Base	Coffman Cove, Alaska	56°00′53″N 132°50′02″W	
PAKD	KDK	Kodiak Municipal Airport	Kodiak, Alaska	57°48′21″N 152°22′26″W	
PAKF	KFP	False Pass Airport	False Pass, Alaska	54°50′51″N 163°24′37″W	
PAKH	AKK	Akhiok Airport	Akhiok, Alaska	56°56′19″N 154°10′57″W	
PAKI	KPN	Kipnuk Airport	Kipnuk, Alaska	59°55′59″N 164°01′50″W	
PAKK	KKA	Koyuk Alfred Adams Airport	Koyuk, Alaska	64°56′22″N 161°09′15″W	
PAKL	LKK	Kulik Lake Airport	Kulik Lake, Alaska	58°58′55″N 155°07′17″W	
PAKN	AKN	King Salmon Airport	King Salmon, Alaska	58°40′35″N 156°38′55″W	
PAKO	IKO	Nikolski Air Station	Nikolski, Alaska	52°56′30″N 168°50′56″W	
PAKP	AKP	Anaktuvuk Pass Airport	Anaktuvuk Pass, Alaska	68°08′01″N 151°44′36″W	
PAKT	KTN	Ketchikan International Airport	Ketchikan, Alaska	55°21′15″N 131°42′40″W	
PAKU	UUK	Ugnu-Kuparuk Airport	Kuparuk, Alaska	70°19′51″N 149°35′51″W	
PAKV	KAL	Kaltag Airport	Kaltag, Alaska	64°19′08″N 158°44′29″W	
PAKW	KLW	Klawock Airport	Klawock, Alaska	55°34′45″N 133°04′34″W	
PAKX		Wilder Runway Airport	Port Alsworth, Alaska	60°11′55″N 154°19′23″W	
PAKY	KYK	Karluk Airport	Karluk, Alaska	57°33′58″N 154°27′14″W	
PALB	KLN	Larsen Bay Airport	Larsen Bay, Alaska	57°32′06″N 153°58′36″W	
PALG	KLG	Kalskag Airport	between the cities of Upper Kalskag and Lower Kalskag	61°32′11″N 160°20′29″W	
PALH		Lake Hood Seaplane Base	Anchorage, Alaska	61°10′54″N 149°57′59″W	
PALJ	PTA	Port Alsworth Airport	Port Alsworth, Alaska	60°12′16″N 154°19′08″W	
PALN	LNI	Point Lonely Short Range Radar Site	Point Lonely, Alaska	70°54′39″N 153°14′32″W	
PALP		Alpine Airstrip	Deadhorse, Alaska	70°20′39″N 150°56′41″W	
PALR	WCR	Chandalar Lake Airport	Chandalar Lake, Alaska	67°30′16″N 148°28′59″W	
PALT	TLT	Tuluksak Airport	Tuluksak, Alaska	61°05′49″N 160°58′10″W	
PALU	LUR	Cape Lisburne LRRS Airport	Cape Lisburne, Alaska	68°52′30″N 166°06′40″W	
PAMB	KMO	Manokotak Airport	Manokotak, Alaska	58°59′19″N 159°02′56″W	
PAMC	MCG	McGrath Airport	McGrath, Alaska	62°57′10″N 155°36′25″W	
PAMD	MDO	Middleton Island Airport	Middleton Island, Alaska	59°26′59″N 146°18′26″W	
PAMH	LMA	Minchumina Airport	Lake Minchumina, Alaska	63°53′10″N 152°18′07″W	
PAMK	SMK	St. Michael Airport	St. Michael, Alaska	63°29′24″N 162°06′37″W	
PAML	MLY	Manley Hot Springs Airport	Manley Hot Springs, Alaska	64°59′51″N 150°38′39″W	
PAMM	MTM	Metlakatla Seaplane Base	Metlakatla, Alaska	55°07′52″N 131°34′41″W	
PAMO	MOU	Mountain Village Airport	Mountain Village, Alaska	62°05′43″N 163°40′55″W	
PAMR	MRI	Merrill Field	Anchorage, Alaska	61°12′49″N 149°50′40″W	
PAMX	MXY	McCarthy Airport	McCarthy, Alaska	61°26′13″N 142°54′13″W	
PAMY	MYU	Mekoryuk Airport	Mekoryuk, Alaska	60°22′17″N 166°16′14″W	
PANA	WNA	Napakiak Airport	Napakiak, Alaska	60°41′25″N 161°58′43″W	
PANC	ANC	Ted Stevens Anchorage International Airport	Anchorage, Alaska	61°10′27″N 149°59′54″W	
PANI	ANI	Aniak Airport	Aniak, Alaska	61°34′54″N 159°32′35″W	
PANN	ENN	Nenana Municipal Airport	Nenana, Alaska	64°32′50″N 149°04′26″W	
PANO	NNL	Nondalton Airport	Nondalton, Alaska	59°58′49″N 154°50′21″W	
PANR	FNR	Funter Bay Seaplane Base	Funter Bay, Alaska	58°15′16″N 134°53′52″W	
PANT	ANN	Annette Island Airport	Annette Island, Alaska	55°02′33″N 131°34′20″W	
PANU	NUL	Nulato Airport	Nulato, Alaska	64°43′46″N 158°04′27″W	
PANV	ANV	Anvik Airport	Anvik, Alaska	62°38′48″N 160°11′26″W	
PANW	KNW	New Stuyahok Airport	New Stuyahok, Alaska	59°27′06″N 157°22′23″W	
PAOB	OBU	Kobuk Airport	Kobuk, Alaska	66°54′44″N 156°53′50″W	
PAOC	PCA	Portage Creek Airport	Portage Creek, Alaska	58°54′23″N 157°42′40″W	
PAOH	HNH	Hoonah Airport	Hoonah, Alaska	58°05′46″N 135°24′35″W	
PAOM	OME	Nome Airport	Nome, Alaska	64°30′44″N 165°26′43″W	
PAOO	OOK	Toksook Bay Airport	Toksook Bay, Alaska	60°32′29″N 165°05′14″W	
PAOR	ORT	Northway Airport	Northway, Alaska	62°57′40″N 141°55′41″W	
PAOT	OTZ	Ralph Wien Memorial Airport	Kotzebue, Alaska	66°53′05″N 162°35′55″W	
PAOU	NLG	Nelson Lagoon Airport	Nelson Lagoon, Alaska	56°00′27″N 161°09′37″W	
PAPB	STG	St. George Airport	St. George, Alaska	56°34′38″N 169°39′49″W	
PAPC	KPC	Port Clarence Coast Guard Station	Port Clarence, Alaska	65°15′13″N 166°51′31″W	
PAPE	KPV	Perryville Airport	Perryville, Alaska	55°54′24″N 159°09′39″W	
PAPG	PSG	Petersburg James A. Johnson Airport	Petersburg, Alaska	56°48′05″N 132°56′46″W	
PAPH	PTH	Port Heiden Airport	Port Heiden, Alaska	56°57′33″N 158°38′00″W	
PAPK	PKA	Napaskiak Airport	Napaskiak, Alaska	60°42′10″N 161°46′42″W	
PAPM	PTU	Platinum Airport	Platinum, Alaska	59°00′41″N 161°49′10″W	
PAPN	PIP	Pilot Point Airport	Pilot Point, Alaska	57°34′49″N 157°34′19″W	
PAPO	PHO	Point Hope Airport	Point Hope, Alaska	68°20′56″N 166°47′58″W	
PAPR	PPC	Prospect Creek Airport	Prospect Creek, Alaska	66°48′51″N 150°38′37″W	
PAQC		Klawock Seaplane Base	Klawock, Alaska	55°33′17″N 133°06′06″W	
PAQH	KWN	Quinhagak Airport	Quinhagak, Alaska	59°45′18″N 161°50′43″W	
PAQT	NUI	Nuiqsut Airport	Nuiqsut, Alaska	70°12′36″N 151°00′20″W	
PARC	ARC	Arctic Village Airport	Arctic Village, Alaska	68°06′53″N 145°34′46″W	
PARS	RSH	Russian Mission Airport	Russian Mission, Alaska	61°46′30″N 161°19′10″W	
PARY	RBY	Ruby Airport	Ruby, Alaska	64°43′38″N 155°28′12″W	
PASA	SVA	Savoonga Airport	Savoonga, Alaska	63°41′11″N 170°29′33″W	
PASC	SCC	Deadhorse Airport (Prudhoe Airport)	Deadhorse, Alaska	70°11′41″N 148°27′55″W	
PASD	SDP	Sand Point Airport	Sand Point, Alaska	55°18′49″N 160°31′17″W	
PASH	SHH	Shishmaref Airport	Shishmaref, Alaska	66°14′58″N 166°05′25″W	
PASI	SIT	Sitka Rocky Gutierrez Airport	Sitka, Alaska	57°02′50″N 135°21′42″W	
PASK	WLK	Selawik Airport	Selawik, Alaska	66°36′00″N 159°59′09″W	
PASL	SLQ	Sleetmute Airport	Sleetmute, Alaska	61°42′02″N 157°09′57″W	
PASM	KSM	St. Mary's Airport	St. Mary's, Alaska	62°03′39″N 163°18′07″W	
PASN	SNP	St. Paul Island Airport	St. Paul Island, Alaska	57°10′02″N 170°13′14″W	
PASO	SOV	Seldovia Airport	Seldovia, Alaska	59°26′33″N 151°42′15″W	
PASP	SMU	Sheep Mountain Airport	Sheep Mountain, Alaska	61°48′41″N 147°30′33″W	
PAST	UMM	Summit Airport	Summit, Alaska	63°19′53″N 149°07′38″W	
PASV	SVW	Sparrevohn LRRS Airport	Sparrevohn, Alaska	61°05′50″N 155°34′29″W	
PASW	SKW	Skwentna Airport	Skwentna, Alaska	61°57′55″N 151°11′29″W	
PASX	SXQ	Soldotna Airport	Soldotna, Alaska	60°28′30″N 151°02′18″W	
PASY	SYA	Eareckson Air Station	Shemya Island, Alaska	52°42′44″N 174°06′49″E	
PATA	TAL	Ralph M. Calhoun Memorial Airport	Tanana, Alaska	65°10′28″N 152°06′34″W	
PATC	TNC	Tin City LRRS Airport	Tin City, Alaska	65°33′47″N 167°55′18″W	
PATE	TLA	Teller Airport	Teller, Alaska	65°14′25″N 166°20′22″W	
PATG	TOG	Togiak Airport	Togiak, Alaska	59°03′13″N 160°23′49″W	
PATJ	TKJ	Tok Airport	Tok, Alaska	63°18′12″N 143°00′04″W	Closed
PATK	TKA	Talkeetna Airport	Talkeetna, Alaska	62°19′14″N 150°05′37″W	
PATL	TLJ	Tatalina LRRS Airport	Tatalina, Alaska	62°53′40″N 155°58′35″W	
PATM		Taylor Mountain Airport	Taylor Mountain Mine, Alaska	60°52′04″N 157°23′31″W	
PATQ	ATK	Atqasuk Edward Burnell Sr. Memorial Airport	Atqasuk, Alaska	70°28′02″N 157°26′08″W	
PATW		Cantwell Airport	Cantwell, Alaska	63°23′28″N 148°57′20″W	
PAUD		Prudhoe Bay Airport	Prudhoe Bay, Alaska	70°15′05″N 148°20′51″W	Closed
PAUK	AUK	Alakanuk Airport	Alakanuk, Alaska	62°40′59″N 164°43′20″W	
PAUM	UMT	Umiat Airport	Umiat, Alaska	69°22′16″N 152°08′06″W	
PAUN	UNK	Unalakleet Airport	Unalakleet, Alaska	63°53′18″N 160°47′56″W	
PAUO	WOW	Willow Airport	Willow, Alaska	61°45′15″N 150°03′06″W	
PAUT	KQA	Akutan Airport	Akutan, Alaska	54°08′41″N 165°36′15″W	
PAVA	VAK	Chevak Airport	Chevak, Alaska	61°32′27″N 165°36′03″W	
PAVC	KVC	King Cove Airport	King Cove, Alaska	55°06′59″N 162°15′58″W	
PAVD	VDZ	Valdez Airport (Pioneer Field)	Valdez, Alaska	61°08′02″N 146°14′54″W	
PAVE	VEE	Venetie Airport	Venetie, Alaska	67°00′31″N 146°21′59″W	
PAVL	KVL	Kivalina Airport	Kivalina, Alaska	67°44′10″N 164°33′49″W	
PAWB	WBQ	Beaver Airport	Beaver, Alaska	66°21′44″N 147°24′24″W	
PAWD	SWD	Seward Airport	Seward, Alaska	60°07′37″N 149°25′08″W	
PAWG	WRG	Wrangell Airport	Wrangell, Alaska	56°29′04″N 132°22′11″W	
PAWI	AIN	Wainwright Airport	Wainwright, Alaska	70°38′17″N 159°59′41″W	
PAWM	WMO	White Mountain Airport	White Mountain, Alaska	64°41′21″N 163°24′46″W	
PAWN	WTK	Noatak Airport	Noatak, Alaska	67°33′40″N 162°58′49″W	
PAWR		Whittier Airport	Whittier, Alaska	60°46′38″N 148°43′11″W	
PAWS	WWA	Wasilla Airport	Wasilla, Alaska	61°34′19″N 149°32′22″W	
PAWT		Wainwright Air Station	Wainwright, Alaska	70°36′49″N 159°51′53″W	
PAXK		Paxson Airport	Paxson, Alaska	63°01′28″N 145°30′02″W	
PAYA	YAK	Yakutat Airport	Yakutat, Alaska	59°30′12″N 139°39′37″W	
PFAK	AKI	Akiak Airport	Akiak, Alaska	60°54′10″N 161°13′50″W	
PFAL	AET	Allakaket Airport	Allakaket, Alaska	66°33′07″N 152°37′20″W	
PFCB	NCN	Chenega Bay Airport	Chenega, Alaska	60°04′38″N 147°59′31″W	
PFCL	CLP	Clarks Point Airport	Clarks Point, Alaska	58°50′01″N 158°31′46″W	
PFCR		Donlin Creek Airport	Crooked Creek, Alaska	62°01′57″N 158°14′10″W	
PFEL	ELI	Elim Airport	Elim, Alaska	64°36′54″N 162°16′14″W	
PFKA	KUK	Kasigluk Airport	Kasigluk, Alaska	60°52′24″N 162°31′28″W	
PFKK	KNK	Kokhanok Airport	Kokhanok, Alaska	59°25′59″N 154°48′09″W	
PFKO	KOT	Kotlik Airport	Kotlik, Alaska	63°01′50″N 163°31′58″W	
PFKP	KPB	Point Baker Seaplane Base	Point Baker, Alaska	56°21′07″N 133°37′21″W	
PFKT	KTS	Brevig Mission Airport	Brevig Mission, Alaska	65°19′53″N 166°27′57″W	
PFKU	KYU	Koyukuk Airport	Koyukuk, Alaska	64°52′33″N 157°43′50″W	
PFKW	KWT	Kwethluk Airport	Kwethluk, Alaska	60°47′25″N 161°26′37″W	
PFME		Mertarvik Quarry Road Landing Strip	Mertarvik, Alaska	60°49′06″N 164°31′08″W	
PFMP	RMP	Rampart Airport	Rampart, Alaska	65°30′28″N 150°08′27″W	
PFNO	ORV	Robert (Bob) Curtis Memorial Airport	Noorvik, Alaska	66°49′03″N 161°01′20″W	
PFNU		Oooguruk Island Heliport	Nuiqsut, Alaska	70°29′44″N 150°15′12″W	
PFSH	SKK	Shaktoolik Airport	Shaktoolik, Alaska	64°22′16″N 161°13′26″W	
PFSV	SVS	Stevens Village Airport	Stevens Village, Alaska	66°01′01″N 149°03′16″W	
PFTK	TKL	Taku Lodge Seaplane Base	Taku Lodge, Alaska	58°29′23″N 133°56′36″W	
PFTO		Tok Junction Airport	Tok, Alaska	63°19′46″N 142°57′13″W	
PFWS	WSN	South Naknek Airport	South Naknek, Alaska	58°42′08″N 157°00′09″W	
PFYU	FYU	Fort Yukon Airport	Fort Yukon, Alaska	66°34′21″N 145°14′47″W	
PFZK		Akiachak Airport	Akiachak, Alaska	60°54′22″N 161°25′37″W	
PODC	DCK	Dahl Creek Airport	Dahl Creek, Alaska	66°56′36″N 156°54′17″W	
POKA	TNK	Tununak Airport	Tununak, Alaska	60°34′32″N 165°16′18″W	
POKW	KWF	Waterfall Seaplane Base	Waterfall, Alaska	55°17′47″N 133°14′36″W	
POLI		Oliktok Long Range Radar Site	Oliktok Point, Alaska	70°29′59″N 149°52′46″W	Closed
POOH		Hoonah Seaplane Base	Hoonah, Alaska	58°06′44″N 135°27′06″W	
PORI	ORI	Port Lions Airport	Port Lions, Alaska	57°53′07″N 152°50′46″W	
POWS	WSB	Steamboat Bay Seaplane Base	Steamboat Bay	55°31′47″N 133°38′30″W	
PPCT	TCT	Takotna Airport	Takotna, Alaska	62°59′37″N 156°01′41″W	
PPDM	DIO	Diomede Heliport	Diomede, Alaska	65°45′30″N 168°57′14″W	
PPEC	PEC	Pelican Seaplane Base	Pelican, Alaska	57°57′19″N 136°14′11″W	
PPIT	NUP	Nunapitchuk Airport	Nunapitchuk, Alaska	60°54′21″N 162°26′21″W	
PPIZ	PIZ	Point Lay LRRS Airport	Point Lay, Alaska	69°43′56″N 163°00′40″W	
PPNU		OTP Heliport	Nuiqsut, Alaska	70°24′51″N 150°01′07″W	
PPWR	PWR	Port Walter Seaplane Base	Port Walter	56°22′52″N 134°39′03″W	

== PC - Phoenix Islands (Kiribati) ==
Also see airport category and list.

- PCIS (CIS) – Canton Island Airport – Canton Island - 02°46′09″S 171°42′19″W

== PG - Mariana Islands ==
Also see airport category and list.

ICAO	IATA	Airport name	Community	Coordinates
PGRO	ROP	Rota International Airport (Benjamin Taisacan Manglona International Airport)	Rota Island	14°10′28″N 145°14′33″E
PGSN	SPN	Saipan International Airport (Francisco C. Ada International Airport)	Saipan Island	15°07′08″N 145°43′46″E
PGWT	TIQ	Tinian International Airport (West Tinian)	Tinian Island	14°59′57″N 145°37′10″E

=== PGU - Guam ===
Also see airport category and list.

ICAO	IATA	Airport name	Community	Coordinates
PGUA	UAM	Andersen Air Force Base	Agana	13°34′34″N 144°55′28″E
PGUM	GUM	Antonio B. Won Pat International Airport (Guam International)	Agana	13°29′06″N 144°47′51″E

== PH - Hawaii ==
Also see airport category and list.

ICAO	IATA	Airport name	Community	Coordinates
PHBK	BKH	Pacific Missile Range Facility (Barking Sands)	Kauaʻi County, Hawaii	22°01′22″N 159°47′06″W
PHDH	HDH	Dillingham Airfield	Mokuleia, Hawaii	21°34′46″N 158°11′50″W
PHHF		French Frigate Shoals Airport	Tern Island, French Frigate Shoals	23°52′11″N 166°17′05″W
PHHI	HHI	Wheeler Army Airfield	Wahiawa, Hawaii	21°28′48″N 158°02′24″W
PHHN	HNM	Hana Airport	Hana, Hawaii	20°47′44″N 156°00′52″W
PHIK	HIK	Hickam AFB	Honolulu, Hawaii	21°19′07″N 157°55′21″W
PHJH	JHM	Kapalua Airport (Kapalua West Mau'i Airport)	Lahaina, Hawaii	20°57′47″N 156°40′23″W
PHJR		Kalaeloa Airport (John Rodgers Field)	Kapolei, Hawaii	21°18′26″N 158°04′13″W
PHKO	KOA	Ellison Onizuka Kona International Airport at Keahole	Kailua-Kona, Hawaii	19°44′20″N 156°02′44″W
PHLI	LIH	Lihu'e Airport	Lihue, Hawaii	21°58′34″N 159°20′20″W
PHLU	LUP	Kalaupapa Airport	Kalaupapa, Hawaii	21°12′40″N 156°58′25″W
PHMK	MKK	Molokai Airport (Hoolehua Airport)	Kaunakakai, Hawaii	21°09′10″N 157°05′47″W
PHMU	MUE	Waimea-Kohala Airport	Kamuela, Hawaii	20°00′05″N 155°40′05″W
PHNG		Marine Corps Air Station Kaneohe Bay	Kaneohe, Hawaii, Honolulu, Hawaii	21°26′45″N 157°46′11″W
PHNL	HNL	Honolulu International Airport (Daniel K. Inouye International Airport)	Honolulu, Hawaii	21°19′07″N 157°55′21″W
PHNP		Naval Auxiliary Landing Field Ford Island	Honolulu, Hawaii	21°21′54″N 157°57′35″W
PHNY	LNY	Lanai Airport	Lanai City, Hawaii	20°47′08″N 156°57′05″W
PHOG	OGG	Kahului Airport	Kahului, Hawaii	20°53′55″N 156°25′50″W
PHPA	PAK	Port Allen Airport	Hanapepe, Hawaii	21°53′49″N 159°36′11″W
PHSF	BSF	Bradshaw Army Airfield	Hawaii (island), Hawaii	19°45′36″N 155°33′14″W
PHTO	ITO	Hilo International Airport	Hilo, Hawaii	19°43′13″N 155°02′54″W
PHUP	UPP	ʻUpolu Airport	Hawi, Hawaii	20°15′55″N 155°51′36″W

== PJ - Johnston Atoll ==
- ~~PJON (JON) – Johnston Atoll Airport~~ (defunct) – Johnston Atoll - 16°43′43″N 169°32′03″W

== PK - Marshall Islands ==
Also see airport category and list.

ICAO	IATA	Airport name	Community	Coordinates
PKMA	ENT	Enewetak Auxiliary Airfield	Enewetak	11°20′27″N 162°19′40″E
PKMJ	MAJ	Marshall Islands International Airport (Amata Kabua Int'l)	Majuro	07°03′53″N 171°16′19″E
PKRO		Dyess Army Airfield	Roi-Namur	09°23′49″N 167°28′15″E
PKWA	KWA	Bucholz Army Airfield	Kwajalein	08°43′12″N 167°43′54″E

== PL - Line Islands (Kiribati) ==
Also see airport category and list.

ICAO	IATA	Airport name	Community	Coordinates	Notes
PLCH	CXI	Cassidy International Airport	Kiritimati, Kiribati (Christmas Island)	01°59′10″N 157°20′59″W	
PLFA	TNV	Tabuaeran Airport	Tabuaeran	03°53′58″N 159°23′20″W	
PLPA		Palmyra (Cooper) Airport	Palmyra Atoll	05°53′19″N 162°04′41″W	United States territory
PLWN	TNQ	Teraina Airfield	Teraina	04°41′54″N 160°23′40″W	

== PM - Midway Atoll ==
- PMDY (MDY) – Henderson Field (Naval Air Facility) – Sand Island – 28°12′05″N 177°22′53″W

== PT - Caroline Islands ==
Also see airport category and list.

All airports listed here except for PTRO are in the Federated States of Micronesia.

ICAO	IATA	Airport name	Community	Coordinates	Notes
PTKK	TKK	Chuuk International Airport	Weno, Chuuk	07°27′43″N 151°50′35″E	
PTPN	PNI	Pohnpei International Airport	Pohnpei	06°59′06″N 158°12′32″E	
PTRO	ROR	Roman Tmetuchl International Airport	Airai, Palau	07°22′02″N 134°32′39″E	
PTSA	KSA	Kosrae International Airport	Kosrae	05°21′25″N 162°57′30″E	
PTYA	YAP	Yap International Airport	Yap	09°29′56″N 138°04′57″E	

== PW - Wake Island ==
- PWAK (AWK) – Wake Island Airfield – Wake Island – 19°16′57″N 166°38′12″E
