= Hageland Aviation Services =

Commuter airline in Alaska, US

IATA	ICAO	Call sign
H6	HAG	HAGELAND
- Founded: 1981; 45 years ago
- Ceased operations: 2020; 6 years ago
- AOC #: EPUA174D
- Hubs: Ted Stevens Anchorage International Airport; Wiley Post–Will Rogers Memorial Airport
- Fleet size: 33
- Destinations: 76
- Headquarters: Anchorage, Alaska, United States
- Key people: James Tweto, President
- Website: www.hageland.com

Hageland Aviation Services was a regional FAR Part 135 airline based in Anchorage, Alaska, United States. It operated as the Ravn Connect component of Ravn Alaska, serving many destinations throughout Alaska.

== History ==
The airline was established in 1981 in Mountain Village, Alaska.

Frontier Alaska and Hageland combined in 2008 to form the parent company HoTH and rebrand their new services as "Frontier Alaska." The following year, with the acquisition of Era, Frontier Alaska was rebranded as Era Alaska. Operations ceased with the collapse and bankruptcy of Ravn Alaska in 2020.

== Fleet ==
- 7 Beechcraft 1900
- 7 Piper PA-31
- 19 Cessna 207
- 22 Cessna Caravan 208B

== Destinations ==
Hageland Aviation Services operated scheduled service to the following destinations in Alaska (as of 2007):

1. Akiachak (KKI) - Akiachak Airport
2. Akiak (AKI) - Akiak Airport
3. Alakanuk (AUK) - Alakanuk Airport
4. Ambler (ABL) - Ambler Airport
5. Anchorage (ANC) - Ted Stevens Anchorage International Airport (Hub)
6. Aniak (ANI) - Aniak Airport (Hub)
7. Anvik (ANV) - Anvik Airport
8. Atmautluak (ATT) - Atmautluak Airport
9. Atqasuk (ATK) - Atqasuk Edward Burnell Sr. Memorial Airport
10. Barter Island / Kaktovik (BTI) - Barter Island LRRS Airport
11. Bethel (BET) - Bethel Airport (Hub)
12. Brevig Mission (KTS) - Brevig Mission Airport
13. Buckland (BKC) - Buckland Airport
14. Chefornak (CYF) - Chefornak Airport
15. Chevak (VAK) - Chevak Airport
16. Chuathbaluk (CHU) - Chuathbaluk Airport
17. Crooked Creek (CKD) - Crooked Creek Airport
18. Deadhorse (SCC) - Deadhorse Airport
19. Deering (DRG) - Deering Airport
20. Eek (EEK) - Eek Airport
21. Elim (ELI) - Elim Airport
22. Emmonak (EMK) - Emmonak Airport (Hub)
23. Gambell (GAM) - Gambell Airport
24. Golovin (GLV) - Golovin Airport
25. Grayling (KGX) - Grayling Airport
26. Holy Cross (HCR) - Holy Cross Airport
27. Hooper Bay (HPB) - Hooper Bay Airport
28. Kalskag (KLG) - Kalskag Airport
29. Kasigluk (KUK) - Kasigluk Airport
30. Kiana (IAN) - Bob Baker Memorial Airport
31. Kipnuk (KPN) - Kipnuk Airport
32. Kivalina (KVL) - Kivalina Airport
33. Kobuk (OBU) - Kobuk Airport
34. Kongiganak (KKH) - Kongiganak Airport
35. Kotlik (KOT) - Kotlik Airport
36. Kotzebue (OTZ) - Ralph Wien Memorial Airport (Hub)
37. Koyuk (KKA) - Koyuk Alfred Adams Airport
38. Kwethluk (KWT) - Kwethluk Airport
39. Kwigillingok (KWK) - Kwigillingok Airport
40. Marshall (MLL) - Marshall Don Hunter Sr. Airport
41. Mekoryuk (MYU) - Mekoryuk Airport
42. Mountain Village (MOU) - Mountain Village Airport
43. Newtok (WWT) - Newtok Airport
44. Nightmute (NME) - Nightmute Airport
45. Noatak (WTK) - Noatak Airport
46. Nome (OME) - Nome Airport (Hub)
47. Noorvik (ORV) - Robert (Bob) Curtis Memorial Airport
48. Nuiqsut (NUI) - Nuiqsut Airport
49. Nunam Iqua / Sheldon Point (SXP) - Sheldon Point Airport
50. Nunapitchuk (NUP) - Nunapitchuk Airport
51. Pilot Station (PQS) - Pilot Station Airport
52. Point Lay (PIZ) - Point Lay LRRS Airport
53. Port Clarence (KPC) - Port Clarence Coast Guard Station
54. Quinhagak (KWN) - Quinhagak Airport
55. Red Devil (RDV) - Red Devil Airport
56. Russian Mission (RSH) - Russian Mission Airport
57. Savoonga (SVA) - Savoonga Airport
58. Scammon Bay (SCM) - Scammon Bay Airport
59. Selawik (WLK) - Selawik Airport
60. Shageluk (SHX) - Shageluk Airport
61. Shaktoolik (SKK) - Shaktoolik Airport
62. Shishmaref (SHH) - Shishmaref Airport
63. Shungnak (SHG) - Shungnak Airport
64. Sleetmute (SLQ) - Sleetmute Airport
65. St. Mary's (KSM) - St. Mary's Airport (Hub)
66. St. Michael (SMK) - St. Michael Airport
67. Stebbins (WBB) - Stebbins Airport
68. Teller (TLA) - Teller Airport
69. Toksook Bay (OOK) - Toksook Bay Airport
70. Tuluksak (TLT) - Tuluksak Airport
71. Tuntutuliak (WTL) - Tuntutuliak Airport
72. Tununak (TNK) - Tununak Airport
73. Unalakleet (UNK) - Unalakleet Airport (Hub)
74. Utqiagvik (BRW) - Wiley Post–Will Rogers Memorial Airport (Hub)
75. Wainwright (AIN) - Wainwright Airport
76. White Mountain (WMO) - White Mountain Airport

== Accidents and incidents ==
On November 8, 1997 Hageland Aviation Services Flight 500 was performed by a Cessna Caravan 675B that crashed. This crash was determined to be caused primarily by pilot error. The accident killed all 8 passengers and crew on board.

On December 9, 2002, during a Raytheon Pre-purchase Flight, a Beechcraft 1900C crashed after running into a mountain in western Arkansas. The accident killed all 3 pilots on board, including Ron Tweto, President of Hageland Aviation Services.

January 6, 2011, a Cessna 208B Grand Caravan passenger plane, registered N715HE, sustained substantial damage in a landing accident at Kipnuk Airport, AK (KPN), U.S. None of the four passengers or two crew members were injured. The airplane operated on Hageland flight 161 from Bethel Airport, AK (BET) to Kipnuk Airport, AK (KPN).

On November 29, 2013, four people were killed when Flight 1453 crashed near the village of St. Mary's. Killed were the pilot, Terry Hanson, 68, and three passengers, all residents of Mountain Village: Rose Polty, 57, Richard Polty, 65, and Wyatt Coffee, five months old. Six more passengers were injured. The flight originated from Bethel.

On October 2, 2016, three people were killed when a Hageland Aviation Services Cessna 208 Caravan operating as Ravn Connect Flight 3153 from Quinhagak, AK impacted mountainous terrain 12 statute miles northwest of its intended destination of Togiak, AK. The flight consisted of two crew members and one passenger. The aircraft's initial impact point was located 200 feet below the summit of a 2500 foot mountain.

On April 11, 2018, a Cessna 208B impacted snow-covered terrain about two miles north of the Atqasuk Airport, Alaska. The pilot, the only occupant onboard, sustained minor injuries, and the airplane sustained substantial damage.
