= Emmonak Airport =

Airport in Alaska, United States

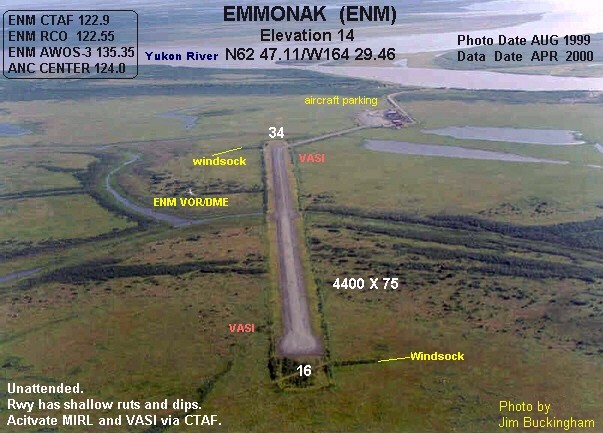
- IATA: EMK; ICAO: PAEM; FAA LID: ENM

Summary
- Airport type: Public
- Owner: State of Alaska DOT&PF - Northern Region
- Serves: Emmonak, Alaska
- Elevation AMSL: 13 ft (4.0 m)
- Coordinates: 62°47′10″N 164°29′27″W

Map
- Location of airport in Alaska

Runways
Direction	Length		Surface
Direction	ft	m	Surface
16/34	4,601	1,402	Gravel

Statistics (2016)
- Based aircraft (2017): 1
- Passengers: 14,745
- Freight: 13,000,000 lbs
- Source: Federal Aviation Administration; Source: Bureau of Transportation

Emmonak Airport (IATA: EMK, ICAO: PAEM, FAA LID: ENM) is a state-owned public-use airport located in Emmonak, a city in the Kusilvak Census Area of the U.S. state of Alaska.

Although most U.S. airports use the same three-letter location identifier for the FAA and IATA, this airport is assigned ENM by the FAA and EMK by the IATA. The airport's ICAO identifier is PAEM.

== Facilities ==
Emmonak Airport has one runway designated 16/34 with a gravel surface measuring 4,601 by 100 feet (1,402 x 30 m).

== Airline and destinations ==
Airlines	Destinations
Grant Aviation	Alakanuk, Bethel, Dillingham, Kotlik, Nunam Iqua

=== Statistics ===
Carrier shares: January – December 2016
Carrier	Passengers (arriving and departing)
Grant	11,540(78.28%)
Hageland	3,080(20.90%)
Era	120(0.81%)

Top domestic destinations: January – December 2016
Rank	City	Airport	Passengers
1	(Alaska) Bethel, AK	Bethel Airport	3,770
2	(Alaska) Saint Marys, AK	St. Marys Airport	1,090
3	(Alaska) Kotlik, AK	Kotlik Airport	1,040
4	(Alaska) Alakanuk, AK	Alakanuk Airport	720
5	(Alaska) Nunam Iqua, AK	Sheldon Point Airport	480
6	(Alaska) Anchorage, AK	Ted Stevens Anchorage International Airport	110

== See also ==
- List of airports in Alaska
