= Alakanuk Airport =

Airport in Alaska, United States of America

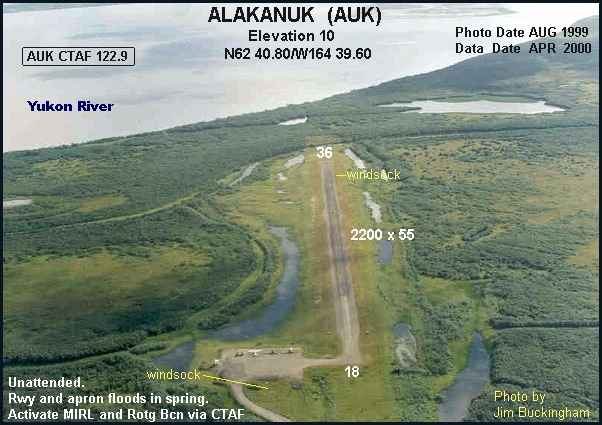
- IATA: AUK; ICAO: PAUK; FAA LID: AUK

Summary
- Airport type: Public
- Owner: Alaska DOT&PF - Northern Region
- Serves: Alakanuk, Alaska
- Elevation AMSL: 21.7 ft (6.6 m)
- Coordinates: 62°40′59″N 164°43′19.9″W

Map
- Location of airport in Alaska

Runways
Direction	Length		Surface
Direction	ft	m	Surface
16/34	4,000	1,219	Gravel

Statistics (2015)
- Aircraft operations: 0 (2012)
- Based aircraft: 0
- Passengers: 5,933
- Freight: 1,041,000 lbs
- Source: Federal Aviation Administration

Alakanuk Airport (IATA: AUK, ICAO: PAUK, FAA LID: AUK) is a state-owned public-use airport located 2 nautical miles (3.7 km) west of the central business district of Alakanuk, a city in the Kusilvak Census Area of the U.S. state of Alaska.

As per Federal Aviation Administration records, the airport had 4,015 passenger boardings (enplanements) in calendar year 2008, 3,302 enplanements in 2009, and 3,213 in 2010. It is included in the National Plan of Integrated Airport Systems for 2011–2015, which categorized it as a non-primary commercial service airport (between 2,500 and 10,000 enplanements per year).

== Facilities ==
Alakanuk Airport was moved to a new location in 2012; previously, it was located southwest of the town, at an elevation of 10 feet (3 m) above mean sea level. It had one runway designated 18/36 with a gravel and dirt surface measuring 2,200 by 55 feet (671 x 17 m). The new airport is at an elevation of 21.7 feet (6.6 m) above mean sea level, and has one gravel runway designated 16/34 with a gravel surface measuring 4,000 by 75 feet (1,219 by 23 m).

== Airlines and destinations ==
The following airlines offer scheduled passenger service at this airport:

Airlines	Destinations
Grant Aviation	Bethel, Emmonak

=== Statistics ===
Carrier shares: January – December 2015
Carrier	Passengers (arriving and departing)
Grant Aviation	4,280(72.21%)
Hageland	1,650(27.79%)

Top domestic destinations: 2015-2016
Rank	City	Airport name & IATA code	Passengers
1	Emmonak, AK	Emmonak Airport (EMK)	2,320
2	Bethel, AK	Bethel Airport (BET)	1480
3	St. Mary's, AK	St. Mary's Airport (KSM)	1390
4	Kotlik, AK	Kotlik Airport (KOT)	230
5	Ketchikan, AK	Ketchikan Airport (KTN)	170
6	Mountain Village, AK	Mountain Village Airport (MOU)	120

== See also ==
- List of airports in Alaska
