= AQH =

AQH may refer to:

- American Quarter Horse
- AQH share, a measurement of radio audience
- Quinhagak Airport, FAA airport ID = AQH
