= Cape Romanzof LRRS Airport =

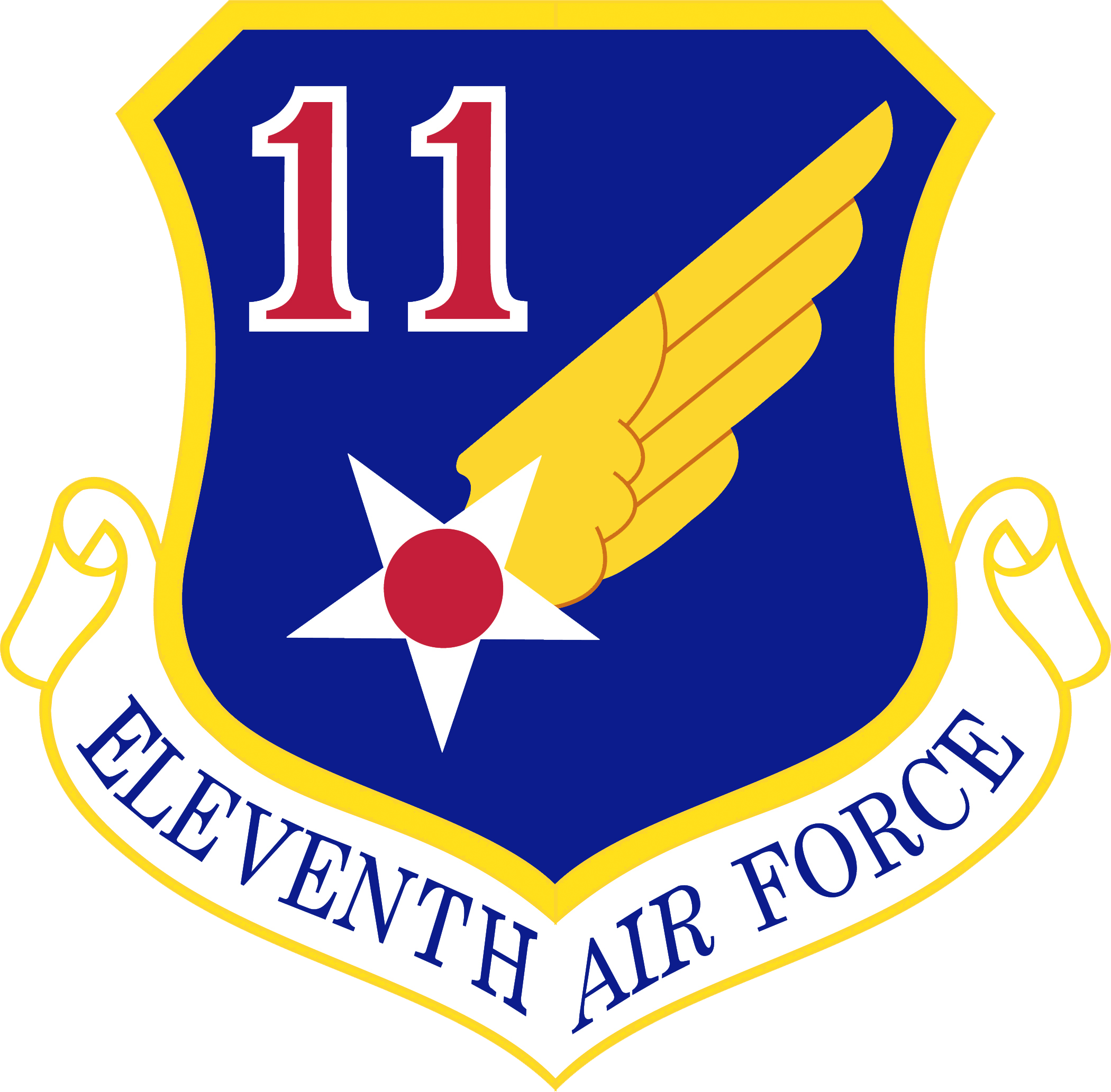
Cape Romanzof LRRS Airport
- IATA: CZF; ICAO: PACZ; FAA LID: CZF

Summary
- Airport type: Military
- Owner: U.S. Air Force
- Location: Cape Romanzof, Alaska
- Elevation AMSL: 464 ft (141 m)
- Coordinates: 61°46′55″N 166°02′13″W

Map
- Location of airport in Alaska

Runways
Direction	Length		Surface
Direction	ft	m	Surface
2/20	3,955	1,205	Gravel

Statistics (2015)
- Based aircraft: 0
- Passengers: 74
- Freight: 3,127 lbs
- Source: Federal Aviation Administration

Cape Romanzof LRRS Airport (IATA: CZF, ICAO: PACZ, FAA LID: CZF) is a military airstrip located six nautical miles (6.9 miles; 11 km) southeast of Cape Romanzof, in the Kusilvak Census Area of the U.S. state of Alaska. It is not open for public use.

== Overview ==
Cape Romanzof Airport is a United States Air Force military airstrip. Its mission is to provide access to the Cape Romanzof Long Range Radar Station for servicing and other requirements.

The airstrip was constructed in 1951 during the construction of the Cape Romanzof Air Force Station. During the station's operational use as a manned radar station, it provided transportation for station personnel and for supplies and equipment to be airlifted to the station. With the manned radar station's closure in 1983, the airstrip now provides access to the unattended site for maintenance personnel and other requirements.

It is not staffed by any support personnel, and is not open to the public. During the winter months, it may be inaccessible due to the extreme weather conditions at the location.

== Facilities ==
Cape Romanzof LRRS Airport has one runway designated 2/20 with a gravel surface measuring 3,925 by 161 feet (1,196 by 49 m).

=== Statistics ===
Carrier shares: January – December 2015
Carrier	Passengers (arriving and departing)
Grant	72(97.30%)
Hageland	2(2.70%)

Top domestic destinations: January – December 2015
Rank	City	Airport	Passengers
1	(Alaska) Bethel, AK	Bethel Airport	33
