= Tutakoke River =

River in Alaska

Coordinates: 61°15′05″N 165°36′41″W

The Tutakoke River is a small coastal river in the Yukon-Kuskokwim Delta. The river is located near Hooper Bay, Alaska, within the Kusilvak Census Area.

== See also ==
- List of Alaska rivers
