= Sheldon Point Airport =

- IATA: SXP; ICAO: PAAU; FAA LID: SXP

Summary
- Airport type: Public
- Owner: State of Alaska DOT&PF - Northern Region
- Location: Nunam Iqua, Alaska (formerly Sheldon Point)
- Elevation AMSL: 12 ft (3.7 m)
- Coordinates: 62°31′14″N 164°50′52″W

Map
- Location of airport in Alaska SXP (the United States)

Runways
Direction	Length		Surface
Direction	ft	m	Surface
1/19	3,015	919	Gravel
9W/27W	15,000	4,572	Water
18W/36W	15,000	4,572	Water
- Source: Federal Aviation Administration

Sheldon Point Airport (IATA: SXP, ICAO: PAAU, FAA LID: SXP) is a state-owned public-use airport located in Nunam Iqua (formerly Sheldon Point), a city in the Kusilvak Census Area of the U.S. state of Alaska. FAA records still list the location as Sheldon Point, but the city was renamed Nunam Iqua in 1999.

== Facilities ==
Sheldon Point Airport covers an area of 120 acres (49 ha) which contains one runway and two seaplane landing areas:

- Runway 1/19: 3,015 x 60 ft (919 x 18 m), surface: gravel
- Runway 9W/27W: 15,000 x 2,000 ft (4,572 x 610 m), surface: water
- Runway 18W/36W: 15,000 x 2,000 ft (4,572 x 610 m), surface: water

== Airlines and destinations ==
Airlines	Destinations
Grant Aviation	Bethel, Emmonak

=== Top destinations ===
Busiest domestic routes out of SXP (July 2010 - June 2011)
Rank	City	Passengers	Carriers
1	(Alaska) Emmonak, AK	1,000	Grant, Hageland

== See also ==
- List of airports in Alaska
