= Kotlik Airport =

Airport in Alaska, United States

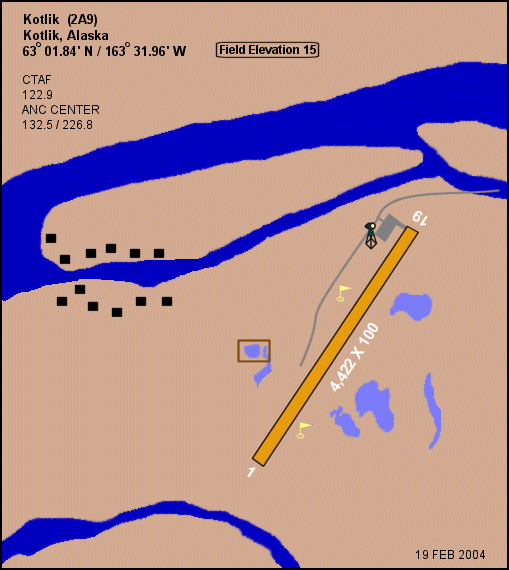
- IATA: KOT; ICAO: PFKO; FAA LID: 2A9

Summary
- Airport type: Public
- Owner: Alaska DOT&PF - Northern Region
- Serves: Kotlik, Alaska
- Elevation AMSL: 15 ft (4.6 m)
- Coordinates: 63°01′50″N 163°31′58″W

Map
- Location of airport in Alaska

Runways
Direction	Length		Surface
Direction	ft	m	Surface
2/20	4,422	1,348	Gravel

Statistics
- Enplanements (2007): 4,117
- Source: Federal Aviation Administration

Kotlik Airport (IATA: KOT, ICAO: PFKO, FAA LID: 2A9) is a state-owned public-use airport located one nautical mile (1.85 km) west of the central business district of Kotlik, a city in the Kusilvak Census Area of the U.S. state of Alaska.

As per Federal Aviation Administration records, this airport had 4,117 passenger boardings (enplanements) in calendar year 2007, an increase of 14% from the 3,654 enplanements in 2006.

== Facilities ==
Kotlik Airport covers an area of 185 acres (75 ha) at an elevation of 15 feet (5 m) above mean sea level. It has one runway designated 2/20 with a 4,422 x 100 ft (1,348 x 30 m) gravel surface.

== Airlines and destinations ==
Airlines	Destinations
Grant Aviation	Bethel, Emmonak

=== Top destinations ===
Busiest domestic routes out of KOT (July 2010 - June 2011)
Rank	City	Passengers	Carriers
1	(Alaska) Emmonak, AK	1,000	Hageland
2	(Alaska) Bethel, AK	1,000	Hageland

== See also ==
- List of airports in Alaska
