= Scammon Bay, Alaska =

Scammon Bay Marayaarmiut
- City
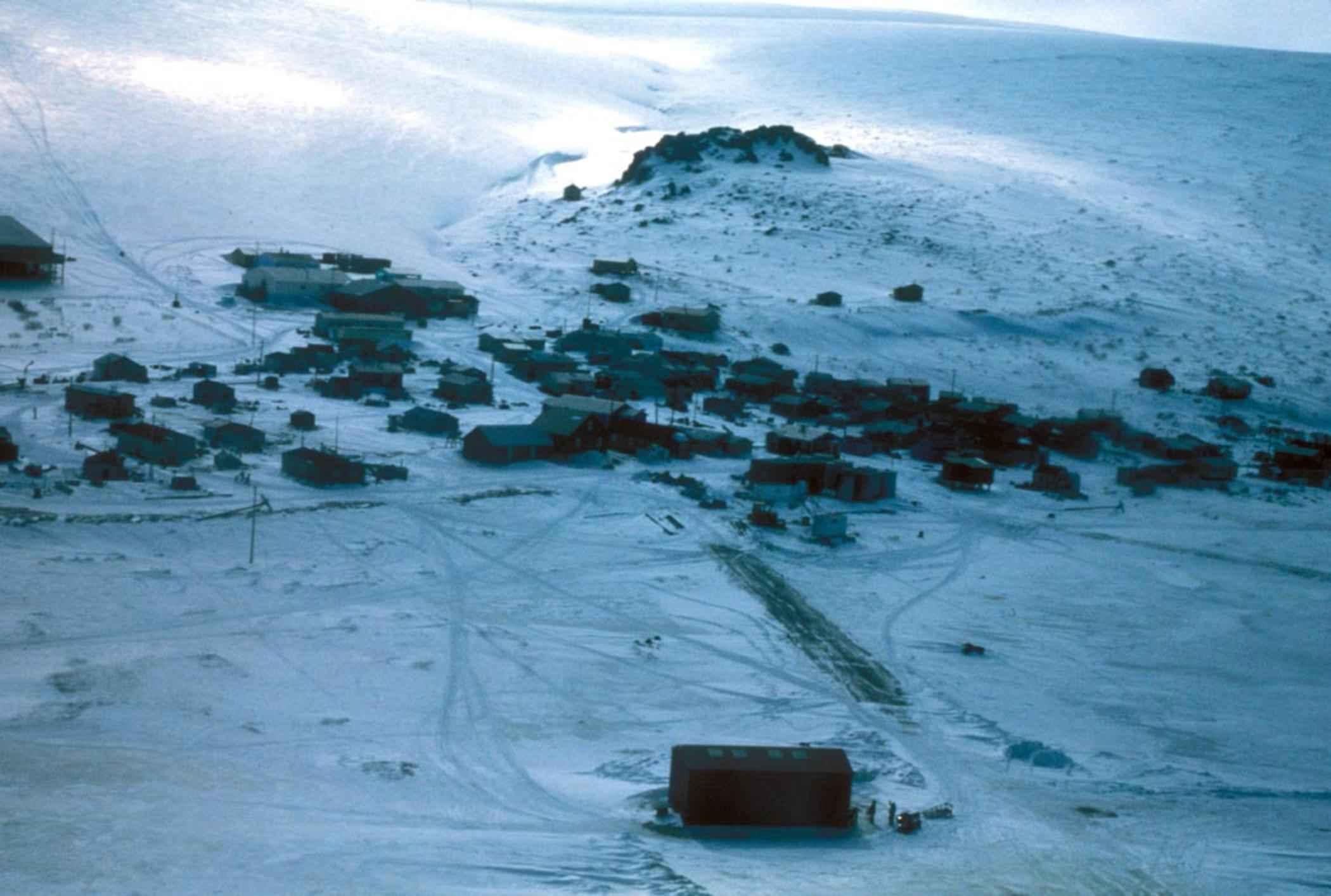

- Location in Alaska
- Coordinates: 61°50′33″N 165°34′54″W
- Country: United States
- State: Alaska
- Census Area: Kusilvak
- Incorporated: May 22, 1967

Government
  - Mayor: Larson Hunter
  - State senator: Donny Olson (D)
  - State rep.: Neal Foster (D)

Area
  - Total: 0.47 sq mi (1.21 km^{2})
  - Land: 0.47 sq mi (1.21 km^{2})
  - Water: 0 sq mi (0.00 km^{2})
- Elevation: 16 ft (5 m)

Population (2020)
  - Total: 600
  - Density: 1,281.6/sq mi (494.82/km^{2})
- Time zone: UTC-9 (Alaska (AKST))
  - Summer (DST): UTC-8 (AKDT)
- ZIP code: 99662
- Area code: 907
- FIPS code: 02-67680
- GNIS feature ID: 1409133

Scammon Bay (Central Yupik: Marayaarmiut) is a city in Kusilvak Census Area, Alaska, United States. As of the 2020 census, Scammon Bay had a population of 600.

== Etymology ==
It was named after Charles Melville Scammon, Chief of Marine of the Western Union Telegraph Expedition by William Healey Dall in 1870. A local dish was also named after Scammon, which is a mixture of scrambled eggs and salmon, taking advantage of the abundance of the fish in the local waters. Popular folk etymology says that scammon is a portmanteau of "scrambled salmon", however that is incorrect as the name of the dish happened after the town was named.

== Geography ==
According to the United States Census Bureau, the city has a total area of 0.6 square miles (1.6 km^{2}), all of it land.

== Demographics ==
Historical population
Census	Pop.	Note	%±
1940	88		—
1950	103		17.0%
1960	115		11.7%
1970	166		44.3%
1980	250		50.6%
1990	343		37.2%
2000	465		35.6%
2010	474		1.9%
2020	600		26.6%
U.S. Decennial Census

Scammon Bay first appeared on the 1940 U.S. Census as an unincorporated village. It formally incorporated in 1967.

=== 2020 census ===
As of the 2020 census, Scammon Bay had a population of 600. The median age was 19.8 years. 45.7% of residents were under the age of 18 and 7.0% of residents were 65 years of age or older. For every 100 females there were 112.0 males, and for every 100 females age 18 and over there were 107.6 males age 18 and over.

0.0% of residents lived in urban areas, while 100.0% lived in rural areas.

There were 118 households in Scammon Bay, of which 68.6% had children under the age of 18 living in them. Of all households, 50.0% were married-couple households, 16.9% were households with a male householder and no spouse or partner present, and 22.9% were households with a female householder and no spouse or partner present. About 11.9% of all households were made up of individuals and 3.3% had someone living alone who was 65 years of age or older.

There were 124 housing units, of which 4.8% were vacant. The homeowner vacancy rate was 0.0% and the rental vacancy rate was 0.0%.

Racial composition as of the 2020 census
Race	Number	Percent
White	4	0.7%
Black or African American	0	0.0%
American Indian and Alaska Native	593	98.8%
Asian	0	0.0%
Native Hawaiian and Other Pacific Islander	0	0.0%
Some other race	0	0.0%
Two or more races	3	0.5%
Hispanic or Latino (of any race)	0	0.0%

=== 2000 census ===
As of the census of 2000, there were 465 people, 96 households, and 84 families residing in the city. The population density was 737.8 inhabitants per square mile (284.9/km^{2}). There were 114 housing units at an average density of 180.9 per square mile (69.8/km^{2}). The racial makeup of the city was 1.94% White, 0.22% Black or African American, 96.13% Native American, 0.22% Pacific Islander, 0.22% from other races, and 1.29% from two or more races. 0.22% of the population were Hispanic or Latino of any race.

There were 96 households, out of which 66.7% had children under the age of 18 living with them, 56.3% were married couples living together, 19.8% had a female householder with no husband present, and 12.5% were non-families. 12.5% of all households were made up of individuals, and 1.0% had someone living alone who was 65 years of age or older. The average household size was 4.84 and the average family size was 5.25.

In the city, the age distribution of the population shows 49.5% under the age of 18, 8.8% from 18 to 24, 24.5% from 25 to 44, 13.3% from 45 to 64, and 3.9% who were 65 years of age or older. The median age was 18 years. For every 100 females, there were 94.6 males. For every 100 females age 18 and over, there were 97.5 males.

The median income for a household in the city was $25,625, and the median income for a family was $25,938. Males had a median income of $36,875 versus $13,750 for females. The per capita income for the city was $7,719. About 30.2% of families and 37.4% of the population were below the poverty line, including 49.0% of those under age 18 and none of those age 65 or over.

== Education ==
K-12 students attend Scammon Bay School, operated by the Lower Yukon School District.
