= Alakanuk, Alaska =

City in Alaska, United States

Alakanuk Alarneq (Central Yupik)
- City
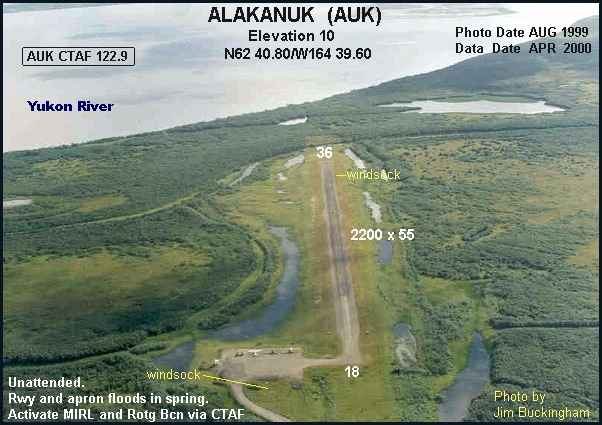
- Alakanuk Airport

- Location in Alaska
- Coordinates: 62°41′5″N 164°38′43″W
- Country: United States
- State: Alaska
- Census area: Kusilvak
- Incorporated: October 28, 1969

Government
  - Mayor: Marilyn Stanislaus
  - State senator: Donny Olson (D)
  - State rep.: Neal Foster (D)

Area
  - Total: 41.80 sq mi (108.26 km^{2})
  - Land: 32.20 sq mi (83.40 km^{2})
  - Water: 9.60 sq mi (24.86 km^{2})
- Elevation: 3.3 ft (1 m)

Population (2020)
  - Total: 756
  - Density: 23.5/sq mi (9.07/km^{2})
- Time zone: UTC-9 (Alaska (AKST))
  - Summer (DST): UTC-8 (AKDT)
- ZIP code: 99554
- Area code: 907
- FIPS code: 02-01200
- GNIS feature ID: 1398042

Alakanuk (ah-LUG-uh-nuck) (Central Yupik: Alarneq) is a second class city in the Kusilvak Census Area of the Unorganized Borough in the western part of the U.S. state of Alaska. As of the 2020 census, Alakanuk had a population of 756.

== Location and climate ==
Alakanuk is located at 62.688890° North, 164.61528° West (Sec. 14, T030N, R082W, Seward Meridian). Alakanuk is located in the Bethel Recording District.

Alakanuk is located at the east entrance of Alakanuk Pass, the major southern channel of the Yukon River, 15 miles (24 km) from the Bering Sea. It is part of the Yukon Delta National Wildlife Refuge. It lies 8 miles (13 km) southwest of Emmonak, approximately 162 miles (261 km) northwest of Bethel. It is the longest village on the lower Yukon - the development stretches over a 3-mile (4.8 km) area along the Pass. Approximately 25 homes along the bank are being threatened by erosion.

The climate of Alakanuk is subarctic, averaging 60 inches (1,500 mm) of snowfall and 19 inches (480 mm) of total precipitation per year. Temperatures range from −25 to 79 °F (−32 to 26 °C). Heavy winds are frequent during the fall and winter. The Yukon River is used as an ice road during freeze-up, from November through May.

According to the United States Census Bureau, the city has a total area of 41.0 square miles (106 km^{2}), of which, 32.4 square miles (84 km^{2}) of it is land and 8.7 square miles (23 km^{2}) of it (21.14%) is water.

== History and culture ==
Alakanuk is a Yup'ik word meaning "wrong way" or "mistake village", aptly applied to a village on this maze of watercourses. The village was first reported by G.R. Putnam of the U.S. Coast & Geodetic Survey in 1899. It was originally settled by a Yup'ik shaman named Anguksuar and his family. A Catholic mission school was built near the village. A post office was established in 1946. In 1948, the school was relocated to St. Mary's, and many families moved from the old school site to Alakanuk. It incorporated as a second-class city in 1969.

A federally recognized tribe is located in the community—the Village of Alakanuk.

== Demographics ==
Historical population
Census	Pop.	Note	%±
1940	61		—
1950	140		129.5%
1960	278		98.6%
1970	414		48.9%
1980	522		26.1%
1990	544		4.2%
2000	652		19.9%
2010	677		3.8%
2020	756		11.7%
U.S. Decennial Census

Alakanuk first appeared on the 1940 U.S. Census as the unincorporated native village of "Alaganuck." It returned as Alakanuk in 1950 and every successive census to date. It formally incorporated in 1969.

=== 2020 census ===
As of the 2020 census, Alakanuk had a population of 756. The median age was 22.6 years. 41.4% of residents were under the age of 18 and 6.0% of residents were 65 years of age or older. For every 100 females there were 109.4 males, and for every 100 females age 18 and over there were 111.0 males age 18 and over.

0.0% of residents lived in urban areas, while 100.0% lived in rural areas.

There were 171 households in Alakanuk, of which 70.8% had children under the age of 18 living in them. Of all households, 35.7% were married-couple households, 21.1% were households with a male householder and no spouse or partner present, and 24.0% were households with a female householder and no spouse or partner present. About 17.6% of all households were made up of individuals and 3.5% had someone living alone who was 65 years of age or older.

There were 181 housing units, of which 5.5% were vacant. The homeowner vacancy rate was 0.0% and the rental vacancy rate was 0.0%.

Racial composition as of the 2020 census
Race	Number	Percent
White	20	2.6%
Black or African American	0	0.0%
American Indian and Alaska Native	718	95.0%
Asian	0	0.0%
Native Hawaiian and Other Pacific Islander	0	0.0%
Some other race	10	1.3%
Two or more races	8	1.1%
Hispanic or Latino (of any race)	2	0.3%

=== 2000 census ===
As of the census of 2000, there were 652 people, 139 households, and 118 families residing in the city. The population density was 20.2 people per square mile (7.8/km^{2}). There were 160 housing units at an average density of 4.9 per square mile (1.9/km^{2}). The racial makeup of the city was 1.99% White, 95.40% Native American, 0.15% Asian, and 2.45% from two or more races.

There were 139 households, out of which 59.7% had children under the age of 18 living with them, 57.6% were married couples living together, 12.9% had a female householder with no husband present, and 15.1% were non-families. 10.8% of all households were made up of individuals, and 2.9% had someone living alone who was 65 years of age or older. The average household size was 4.69 and the average family size was 5.19.

In the city, the age distribution of the population shows 44.6% under the age of 18, 12.9% from 18 to 24, 21.9% from 25 to 44, 13.7% from 45 to 64, and 6.9% who were 65 years of age or older. The median age was 20 years. For every 100 females, there were 111.0 males. For every 100 females age 18 and over, there were 109.9 males.

The median income for a household in the city was $26,346, and the median income for a family was $26,500. Males had a median income of $19,792 versus $32,500 for females. The per capita income for the city was $6,884. About 32.5% of families and 33.8% of the population were below the poverty line, including 34.1% of those under age 18 and 25.8% of those age 65 or over.

== Facilities, utilities, and healthcare ==
The City operates the water and piped sewer system and the central watering point. Approximately 90% of homes are connected. There is a sewage lagoon available for individuals to dump their honey buckets.

The City Council is the policy-making body for the utility. Water is derived from the Alakanuk Slough; it is treated, stored in a tank, and piped to most of the community. In 1998, 83 homes, the school and teachers' housing were connected to a new piped system. New facilities include a water treatment plant, heated 300,000-gal. water storage tank, vacuum sewage plant, sewage lagoon, Arctic piping, and household plumbing.

A new subdivision is currently underway, and nine homes will be connected to the piped utilities. The city has funding from DEC for service connections to 20 homes. Ten homes have been moved from the erosion zone on the river bank and are ready for service. The city is planning to move an additional 10 homes.

AVCP is building a 9-home subdivision, including water and sewer mains and service connections, for occupancy in 2002. The city completed a feasibility study for service area 7, which is the area across the river, and would like to obtain funding to make this expansion. The landfill is reported as inactive.

Electricity is provided by AVEC. Local hospitals or health clinics include Alakanuk Health Clinic and Pearl E. Johnson Sub-Regional Clinic in Emmonak. Alakanuk Health Clinic is a Primary Health Care facility. Alakanuk is classified as an isolated village, located in EMS Region 7A in the Yukon/Kuskokwim Region. Emergency Services have coastal and air access. Emergency service is provided by a health aide.

The sale, importation and possession of alcohol are banned in the village.

== Education ==
K-12 students are zoned for Alakanuk School.

== Economy and transportation ==
Alakanuk experiences a seasonal economy. 76 residents hold commercial fishing permits. Many have gill net permits, and set net fishermen sell their salmon to Seattle fish buyers. Poor fish returns since 1998 have significantly affected the community.

Government employment and retail businesses provide limited year-round employment. Salmon, beluga whale, seal, moose and rabbit provide food sources. Some residents trap. Many residents travel to Emmonak to shop and attend social events and basketball tournaments.

Alakanuk Airport, a State-owned 2,200' long by 55' wide gravel airstrip, is available for air transport. However, an airport relocation project is underway due to erosion. Grant Aviation, Hageland Aviation and Tanana Air Service offer passenger flight service. Alakanuk is easily accessible from the Yukon River and Bering Sea by barge and riverboat. Most passengers and mail arrive by air.

There are no roads connecting Alakanuk with other population centers in the region, but ice roads are used in winter. Snow machines and boats are used for local travel.

Taxes: Sales: 4%, Property: None, Special: None

== Notable people ==
- Father Segundo Llorente (1906–1989), a Jesuit priest born in Spain, was elected to the Alaska House of Representatives in 1960 as a write-in candidate while stationed in Alakanuk
