= Russian Mission, Alaska =

Russian Mission Iqugmiut (Central Yupik) Икогмют (Russian)
- City
- Iqurmiut Traditional Council
- Aerial view of Russian Mission

- Location in Alaska
- Coordinates: 61°47′8″N 161°20′3″W
- Country: United States
- State: Alaska
- Census Area: Kusilvak
- ANCSA regional corporation: Calista
- Incorporated: October 28, 1970

Government
  - Mayor: Basil Changsak
  - State senator: Donny Olson (D)
  - State rep.: Neal Foster (D)

Area
  - Total: 5.72 sq mi (14.82 km^{2})
  - Land: 5.37 sq mi (13.90 km^{2})
  - Water: 0.36 sq mi (0.92 km^{2})
- Elevation: 52 ft (16 m)

Population (2020)
  - Total: 421
  - Density: 78.4/sq mi (30.28/km^{2})
- Time zone: UTC-9 (AKST)
  - Summer (DST): UTC-8 (AKDT)
- ZIP code: 99657
- Area code: 907
- FIPS code: 02-65700
- GNIS feature ID: 1408925

Russian Mission (Central Yupik: Iqugmiut; Russian: Икогмют - Ikogmiut, now Рашен-Мишен) is a city in Kusilvak Census Area, Alaska. It was the location of a fur trading post of the Russian-American Company in 1842. After the sale of Russian-American possessions to the United States in 1867, it was officially named Russian Mission in the early 1900s. The sale of alcohol is prohibited. At the 2020 census the population was 421, up from 312 in 2010.

== History ==
The first Russian-American Company fur trading post on the Yukon River was established here in 1837. The settlement was recorded as a Cup'ik village called "Ikogmiut," meaning "people of the point," in 1842 by the Imperial Russian Navy explorer Lavrenty Zagoskin.

The first Russian Orthodox mission in Interior Alaska was established here in 1851 by the Aleut priest Jacob Netsvetov. The mission was called "Pokrovskaya Mission," and the village name was changed to Russian Mission around 1900. It was often confused with a village on the Kuskokwim that was also called "Russian Mission" (or "Little Russian Mission") but which was renamed Chuathbaluk in the 1960s.

The city was incorporated in 1970.

== Geography and climate ==
Russian Mission is located at 61°47′8″N 161°20′3″W (61.785522, -161.334074).

Russian Mission is located on the right (western) bank of the Yukon River in the Yukon-Kuskokwim Delta, 25 miles southeast of Marshall. It lies 70 air miles northeast of Bethel and 376 miles west of Anchorage.

According to the United States Census Bureau, the city has a total area of 6.2 square miles (16 km^{2}), of which, 5.7 square miles (15 km^{2}) of it is land and 0.5 square miles (1.3 km^{2}) of it (8.27%) is water.

Russian Mission falls within the transitional climate zone, characterized by tundra interspersed with boreal forests, and weather patterns of long, cold winters and shorter, warm summers. Heavy northern winds often limit air access in the fall and winter. The Lower Yukon is ice-free from mid-June through October.

Russian Mission has a subarctic climate (Koppen: Dfc) with mild summers and long, snowy winters with annual snowfall averaging 71 inches (180 cm).

Climate data for Russian Mission (1961–1990 normals, extremes 1928–1987)
Month	Jan	Feb	Mar	Apr	May	Jun	Jul	Aug	Sep	Oct	Nov	Dec	Year
Record high °F (°C)	48 (9)	45 (7)	45 (7)	60 (16)	79 (26)	80 (27)	86 (30)	82 (28)	70 (21)	59 (15)	48 (9)	48 (9)	86 (30)
Mean maximum °F (°C)	35.4 (1.9)	34.6 (1.4)	40.0 (4.4)	47.1 (8.4)	64.8 (18.2)	74.2 (23.4)	77.2 (25.1)	70.7 (21.5)	63.1 (17.3)	48.9 (9.4)	38.8 (3.8)	37.5 (3.1)	79.2 (26.2)
Mean daily maximum °F (°C)	13.7 (−10.2)	14.6 (−9.7)	24.4 (−4.2)	33.5 (0.8)	50.1 (10.1)	60.1 (15.6)	63.6 (17.6)	60.5 (15.8)	51.7 (10.9)	35.4 (1.9)	22.5 (−5.3)	15.7 (−9.1)	37.3 (2.9)
Daily mean °F (°C)	4.3 (−15.4)	5.4 (−14.8)	15.6 (−9.1)	21.7 (−5.7)	40.3 (4.6)	50.5 (10.3)	54.5 (12.5)	51.2 (10.7)	43.2 (6.2)	27.2 (−2.7)	16.8 (−8.4)	6.7 (−14.1)	28.1 (−2.2)
Mean daily minimum °F (°C)	−4.3 (−20.2)	−4.2 (−20.1)	2.5 (−16.4)	12.0 (−11.1)	29.6 (−1.3)	40.5 (4.7)	45.0 (7.2)	42.8 (6.0)	34.4 (1.3)	20.7 (−6.3)	7.6 (−13.6)	−1.4 (−18.6)	18.9 (−7.3)
Mean minimum °F (°C)	−33.5 (−36.4)	−33.4 (−36.3)	−20.5 (−29.2)	−12.4 (−24.7)	14.7 (−9.6)	28.1 (−2.2)	34.1 (1.2)	29.1 (−1.6)	21.1 (−6.1)	−0.9 (−18.3)	−12.9 (−24.9)	−30.7 (−34.8)	−39.4 (−39.7)
Record low °F (°C)	−54 (−48)	−50 (−46)	−52 (−47)	−38 (−39)	−21 (−29)	10 (−12)	27 (−3)	21 (−6)	13 (−11)	−20 (−29)	−31 (−35)	−44 (−42)	−54 (−48)
Average precipitation inches (mm)	1.41 (36)	0.89 (23)	1.10 (28)	1.07 (27)	1.01 (26)	1.56 (40)	2.48 (63)	2.95 (75)	2.39 (61)	2.10 (53)	1.84 (47)	1.90 (48)	20.71 (526)
Average snowfall inches (cm)	16.5 (42)	5.7 (14)	7.9 (20)	7.1 (18)	0.2 (0.51)	0.0 (0.0)	0.0 (0.0)	0.0 (0.0)	0.0 (0.0)	3.0 (7.6)	13.1 (33)	16.3 (41)	69.8 (177)
Average precipitation days (≥ 0.01 inch)	7.1	4.5	5.9	5.8	6.9	9.9	13.8	13.5	12.4	8.7	7.6	8.8	104.9
Average snowy days (≥ 0.1 inch)	7.4	4.1	5.9	3.5	0.3	0.0	0.0	0.0	0.0	1.8	7.1	7.7	37.8
Source 1: WRCC
Source 2: XMACIS (snowfall)

== Demographics ==
Historical population
Census	Pop.	Note	%±
1880	148		—
1890	140		−5.4%
1900	166		18.6%
1920	90		—
1930	54		−40.0%
1940	34		−37.0%
1950	55		61.8%
1960	102		85.5%
1970	146		43.1%
1980	169		15.8%
1990	246		45.6%
2000	296		20.3%
2010	312		5.4%
2020	421		34.9%
U.S. Decennial Census

Russian Mission first reported on the 1880 U.S. Census as Ikogmute Mission, an unincorporated Inuit village & Russian Orthodox Mission. It appeared on the 1890 census as "Ikogmiut", but included the nearby village of "Pokrovskaia" (called Pogoreshapka on the 1880 U.S. Census). In 1900, it was returned again as Ikogmute Mission. In 1920, it would be officially returned as Russian Mission. It would formally incorporate in 1970.

=== 2020 census ===
As of the 2020 census, Russian Mission had a population of 421. The median age was 23.1 years. 43.9% of residents were under the age of 18 and 5.9% of residents were 65 years of age or older. For every 100 females there were 100.5 males, and for every 100 females age 18 and over there were 100.0 males age 18 and over.

0.0% of residents lived in urban areas, while 100.0% lived in rural areas.

There were 95 households in Russian Mission, of which 70.5% had children under the age of 18 living in them. Of all households, 35.8% were married-couple households, 25.3% were households with a male householder and no spouse or partner present, and 26.3% were households with a female householder and no spouse or partner present. About 16.9% of all households were made up of individuals and 3.2% had someone living alone who was 65 years of age or older.

There were 95 housing units, of which 0.0% were vacant. The homeowner vacancy rate was 0.0% and the rental vacancy rate was 0.0%.

Racial composition as of the 2020 census
Race	Number	Percent
White	7	1.7%
Black or African American	0	0.0%
American Indian and Alaska Native	398	94.5%
Asian	0	0.0%
Native Hawaiian and Other Pacific Islander	0	0.0%
Some other race	0	0.0%
Two or more races	16	3.8%
Hispanic or Latino (of any race)	0	0.0%

=== 2000 census ===
As of the 2000 census, there were 296 people, 70 households, and 60 families residing in the city. The population density was 52.3 inhabitants per square mile (20.2/km^{2}). There were 81 housing units at an average density of 14.3 units per square mile (5.5 units/km^{2}). The racial makeup of the city was 93.92% Native American and 6.08% White.

There were 70 households, out of which 67.1% had children under the age of 18 living with them, 51.4% were married couples living together, 24.3% had a female householder with no husband present, and 12.9% were non-families . 10.0% of all households were made up of individuals, and 1.4% had someone living alone who was 65 years of age or older. The average household size was 4.23 and the average family size was 4.51.

In the city, the age distribution of the population shows 48.0% under the age of 18, 12.5% from 18 to 24, 24.0% from 25 to 44, 11.5% from 45 to 64, and 4.1% who were 65 years of age or older. The median age was 19 years. For every 100 females, there were 109.9 males. For every 100 females age 18 and over, there were 94.9 males.

The median income for a household in the city was $27,500, and the median income for a family was $22,500. Males had a median income of $17,083 versus $13,750 for females. The per capita income for the city was $8,358. About 15.6% of families and 21.8% of the population were below the poverty line, including 21.7% of those under the age of eighteen and 15.4% of those 65 or over.

Most residents are Russian Orthodox, with a Roman Catholic minority.

== Transportation ==
Russian Mission is served by Russian Mission Airport. Passengers, mail, and light goods arrive primarily by air. A gravel airstrip and seaplane landing area are owned and operated by the state. Scheduled daily flights are available.

Russian Mission's location on the Yukon River allows barge and small boat travel during the summer.

Snowmachines are used in inter-village transportation in the winter, and a trail is marked to Kalskag.

== Education ==
K-12 students attend Russian Mission School, operated by the Lower Yukon School District.
