= Marshall, Alaska =

Marshall Masserculleq
- City
- Location in Alaska
- Coordinates: 61°52′41″N 162°5′5″W
- Country: United States
- State: Alaska
- Census Area: Kusilvak
- Incorporated: June 9, 1970

Government
  - Mayor: Nora Tikiun
  - State senator: Donny Olson (D)
  - State rep.: Neal Foster (D)

Area
  - Total: 4.07 sq mi (10.53 km^{2})
  - Land: 4.06 sq mi (10.52 km^{2})
  - Water: 0.0039 sq mi (0.01 km^{2})
- Elevation: 115 ft (35 m)

Population (2020)
  - Total: 492
  - Density: 121.2/sq mi (46.78/km^{2})
- Time zone: UTC-9 (Alaska (AKST))
  - Summer (DST): UTC-8 (AKDT)
- ZIP code: 99585
- Area code: 907
- FIPS code: 02-47000
- GNIS feature ID: 1405984

Marshall (Central Yupik: Masserculleq) is a city in Kusilvak Census Area, Alaska, United States. At the 2010 census the population was 414, up from 349 in 2000. Currently, Marshall has reported a population of 492 from the most recent Census conducted in 2020.

== Geography ==
Marshall is located at 61°52′41″N 162°05′05″W.

According to the United States Census Bureau, the city has a total area of 4.7 square miles (12 km^{2}), all of it land.

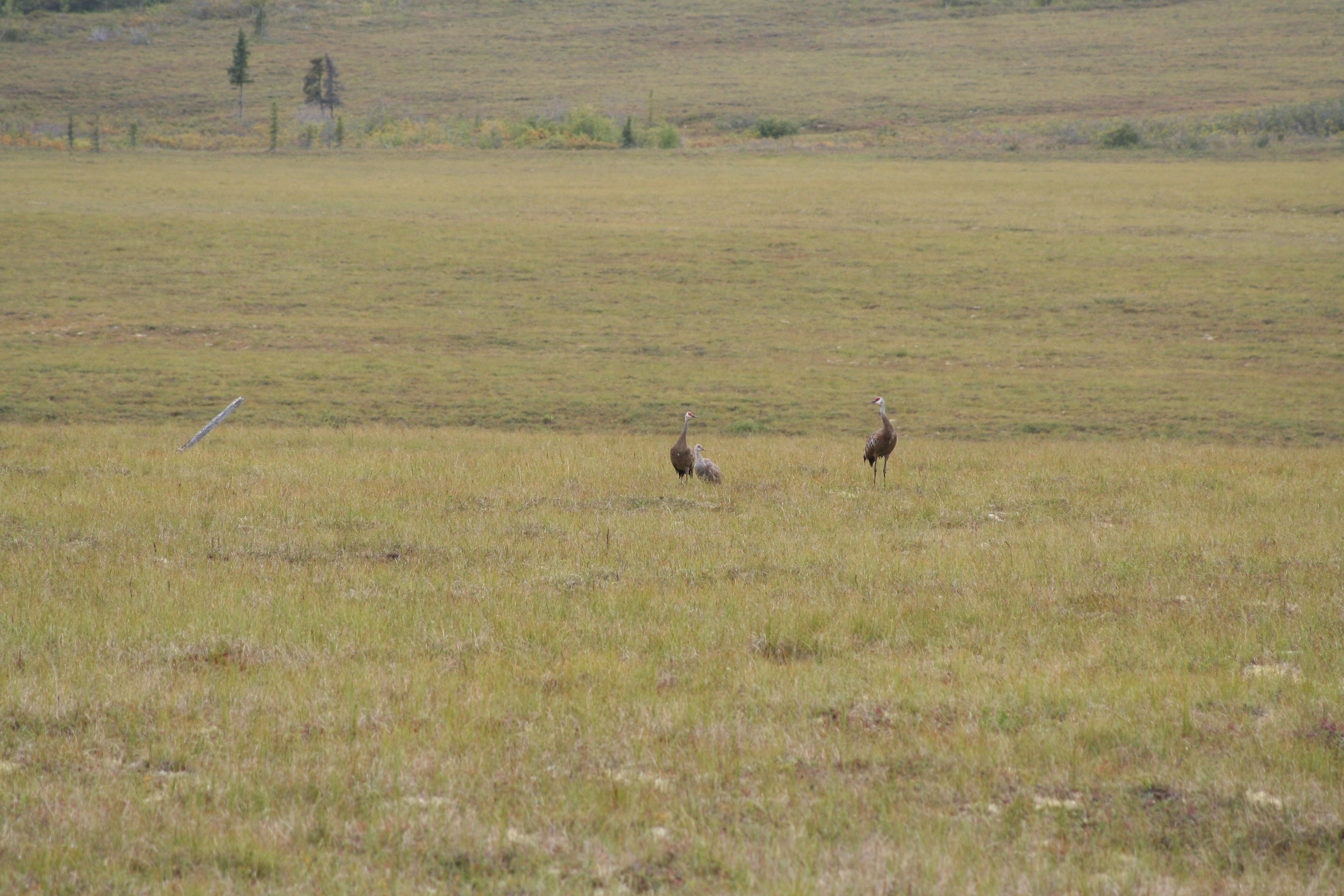
Sand Hill Cranes, Marshall, AK

== Demographics ==
Historical population
Census	Pop.	Note	%±
1880	102		—
1940	91		—
1950	95		4.4%
1960	166		74.7%
1970	175		5.4%
1980	262		49.7%
1990	273		4.2%
2000	349		27.8%
2010	414		18.6%
2020	492		18.8%
U.S. Decennial Census

The predecessor village to Marshall first appeared on the 1880 U.S. Census as the Yupik village of "Ooglovia." It was also known as Uglovaia. It would not appear again on the census. Marshall first appeared on the 1940 U.S. Census as the unincorporated village of Fortuna Ledge. In 1950, the name was changed to Marshall. It continued to return as Marshall in 1960 and 1970, but in the latter year incorporated as the city of Fortuna Ledge. It reported as Fortuna Ledge on the 1980 census, but the city reverted to the name of Marshall in 1984. It has continued to report as Marshall since the 1990 census.

=== 2020 census ===
As of the 2020 census, Marshall had a population of 492. The median age was 24.7 years. 37.0% of residents were under the age of 18 and 8.1% of residents were 65 years of age or older. For every 100 females there were 111.2 males, and for every 100 females age 18 and over there were 98.7 males age 18 and over.

0.0% of residents lived in urban areas, while 100.0% lived in rural areas.

There were 115 households in Marshall, of which 60.9% had children under the age of 18 living in them. Of all households, 33.0% were married-couple households, 23.5% were households with a male householder and no spouse or partner present, and 26.1% were households with a female householder and no spouse or partner present. About 17.4% of all households were made up of individuals and 6.1% had someone living alone who was 65 years of age or older.

There were 131 housing units, of which 12.2% were vacant. The homeowner vacancy rate was 0.0% and the rental vacancy rate was 7.0%.

Racial composition as of the 2020 census
Race	Number	Percent
White	8	1.6%
Black or African American	2	0.4%
American Indian and Alaska Native	464	94.3%
Asian	0	0.0%
Native Hawaiian and Other Pacific Islander	0	0.0%
Some other race	1	0.2%
Two or more races	17	3.5%
Hispanic or Latino (of any race)	1	0.2%

=== 2000 census ===
As of the census of 2000, there were 349 people, 91 households, and 73 families residing in the city. The population density was 73.9 inhabitants per square mile (28.5/km^{2}). There were 104 housing units at an average density of 22.0 per square mile (8.5/km^{2}). The racial makeup of the city was 2.01% White, 95.99% Alaska Native or Native American, and 2.01% from two or more races. 0.29% of the population were Hispanic or Latino of any race.

There were 91 households, out of which 59.3% had children under the age of 18 living with them, 48.4% were married couples living together, 22.0% had a female householder with no husband present, and 18.7% were non-families. 15.4% of all households were made up of individuals, and 1.1% had someone living alone who was 65 years of age or older. The average household size was 3.84 and the average family size was 4.23.

In the city, the age distribution of the population shows 45.3% under the age of 18, 9.7% from 18 to 24, 23.5% from 25 to 44, 17.5% from 45 to 64, and 4.0% who were 65 years of age or older. The median age was 22 years. For every 100 females, there were 100.6 males. For every 100 females age 18 and over, there were 107.6 males.

The median income for a household in the city was $32,917, and the median income for a family was $37,750. Males had a median income of $25,469 versus $37,917 for females. The per capita income for the city was $9,597. About 20.8% of families and 28.6% of the population were below the poverty line, including 32.7% of those under age 18 and 20.0% of those age 65 or over.

== History ==
Marshall's previous name, changed in 1984, from Fortuna Ledge, was a mining village in the 1800s and early 1900s, with mining operations in Wilson Creek, just down river from the Ledge. With that, many Alaska Natives were moved from other villages, as far away as Unalakleet, Ohogamuit and Takchak. With that, there are two main Native groups, the Yupik descendants, hailing from both Takchak and Ohogamuit, and the Inupiaq descendants, hailing from Unalakleet. Along with those of Native descent, Marshall hosts a population of people of Russian and Norwegian descent mixed with Inupiaqs and has become a Yup'ik/Inupiaq/Russian community. Marshall was reportedly named for Vice-president Thomas Riley Marshall, who served from 1913 to 1921.

== Education ==
K-12 students attend Marshall School, operated by the Lower Yukon School District.
