= Atmautluak, Alaska =

Atmautluak, Alaska Atmaulluaq
- CDP
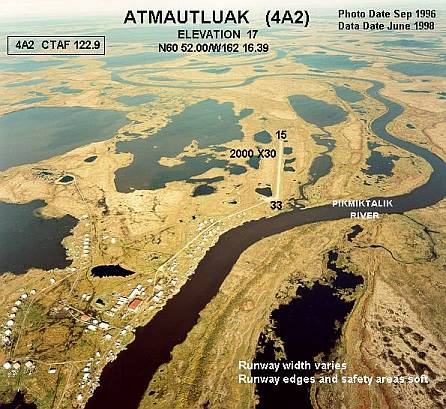
- Aerial photograph of Atmautluak

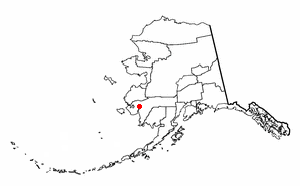
- Location of Atmautluak, Alaska
- Coordinates: 60°51′35″N 162°16′39″W
- Country: United States
- State: Alaska
- Census Area: Bethel

Government
  - State senator: Lyman Hoffman (D)
  - State rep.: Conrad McCormick (D)

Area
  - Total: 3.37 sq mi (8.74 km^{2})
  - Land: 0.61 sq mi (1.57 km^{2})
  - Water: 2.77 sq mi (7.18 km^{2})

Population (2020)
  - Total: 386
  - Density: 638.6/sq mi (246.58/km^{2})
- Time zone: UTC-9 (Alaska (AKST))
  - Summer (DST): UTC-8 (AKDT)
- ZIP code: 99559
- Area code: 907
- FIPS code: 02-04430

Atmautluak (Central Yupik: Atmaulluaq) is a census-designated place (CDP) in Bethel Census Area, Alaska, United States. As of the 2020 census, Atmautluak had a population of 386.

== History ==
The area has traditionally been inhabited by the Yup'ik people.

The community was founded in the 1960s to take advantage of high ground above flooding. Atmautluak was incorporated in 1976, but dissolved the incorporation in 1996 in order to return to traditional native government.

== Geography ==
Atmautluak is located at 60°51′35″N 162°16′39″W (60.859675, -162.277616).

According to the United States Census Bureau, the CDP has a total area of 3.3 square miles (8.5 km^{2}), of which, 0.6 square miles (1.6 km^{2}) of it is land and 2.7 square miles (7.0 km^{2}) of it (81.19%) is water.

The village is located by the Pitmiktakik River.

== Demographics ==
Historical population
Census	Pop.	Note	%±
1980	219		—
1990	258		17.8%
2000	294		14.0%
2010	277		−5.8%
2020	386		39.4%
U.S. Decennial Census

Atmautluak first appeared on the 1980 U.S. Census as an incorporated city, having incorporated in 1976. It disincorporated in 1996 and was made a census-designated place (CDP) effective as of 2000.

As of the census of 2000, there were 294 people, 60 households, and 54 families residing in the CDP. The population density was 462.0 inhabitants per square mile (178.4/km^{2}). There were 64 housing units at an average density of 100.6 per square mile (38.8/km^{2}). The racial makeup of the CDP was 4.08% White, 94.56% Native American, and 1.36% from two or more races. Hispanic or Latino of any race were 1.02% of the population.

There were 60 households, out of which 58.3% had children under the age of 18 living with them, 66.7% were married couples living together, 11.7% had a female householder with no husband present, and 10.0% were non-families. 8.3% of all households were made up of individuals, and 1.7% had someone living alone who was 65 years of age or older. The average household size was 4.90 and the average family size was 5.22.

In the CDP, the population was spread out, with 33.3% under the age of 18, 18.4% from 18 to 24, 25.2% from 25 to 44, 17.7% from 45 to 64, and 5.4% who were 65 years of age or older. The median age was 24 years. For every 100 females, there were 102.8 males. For every 100 females age 18 and over, there were 120.2 males.

The median income for a household in the CDP was $37,917, and the median income for a family was $39,583. Males had a median income of $20,625 versus $8,750 for females. The per capita income for the CDP was $8,501. About 31.6% of families and 30.3% of the population were below the poverty line, including 44.0% of those under the age of eighteen and 15.4% of those 65 or over.

== Education ==
Lower Kuskokwim School District operates the Joann A. Alexie Memorial School. It covers grades PreK-12. As of 2018 it has about 118 students.
