= Port Clarence Coast Guard Station =

Airport in Alaska, United States

- IATA: KPC; ICAO: PAPC; FAA LID: KPC

Summary
- Airport type: Private
- Owner: U.S. Government
- Serves: Port Clarence, Alaska
- Elevation AMSL: 10 ft (3.0 m)
- Coordinates: 65°15′13″N 166°51′31″W

Map
- Location of airport in Alaska

Runways
Direction	Length		Surface
Direction	ft	m	Surface
16/34	4,500	1,372	Asphalt

Statistics (1992)
- Aircraft operations: 200
- Source: Federal Aviation Administration

Port Clarence Coast Guard Station (IATA: KPC, ICAO: PAPC, FAA LID: KPC) (formerly known as Point Spencer Air Force Base) is a private-use airport located one nautical mile (2 km) northeast of the central business district of Port Clarence in the Nome Census Area of the U.S. state of Alaska. It is owned by the U.S. Government.

== History ==
Point Spencer Air Force Base was constructed in World War II by the United States Army Air Forces. The runway was installed with Pierced Steel Planking runway. Around 1948, the base was closed and mothballed. It was thought that the Russians were using the airfield, so in 1950, a team of army engineers were deployed from a C-47 Skytrain to destroy the remaining hangars and buildings. The Pierced Steel Planking was dismantled, and the buildings were demolished and burnt.

=== Port Clarence Coast Guard Station ===
In 1961, a survey was conducted to construct the Coast Guard's LORAN Station Port Clarence, located south of the former airfield. Shortly afterwards in 1963, the Port Clarence Coast Guard Station airfield was established on the location of the former air base.

== Facilities and aircraft ==
Port Clarence Coast Guard Station has one runway designated 16/34 with a 4,500 × 120 ft (1,372 × 37 m) asphalt pavement. For the 12-month period ending September 9, 1992, the airport had 200 aircraft operations: 50% air taxi and 50% general aviation.
