= Mountain Village, Alaska =

Mountain Village Asaacaryaraq
- City
- Location in Alaska
- Coordinates: 62°5′24″N 163°43′26″W
- Country: United States
- State: Alaska
- Census Area: Kusilvak
- Incorporated: December 20, 1967

Government
  - Mayor: Matt Andrews
  - State senator: Donald Olson (D)
  - State rep.: Neal Foster (D)

Area
  - Total: 5.41 sq mi (14.02 km^{2})
  - Land: 4.21 sq mi (10.91 km^{2})
  - Water: 1.20 sq mi (3.12 km^{2})
- Elevation: 16 ft (5 m)

Population (2020)
  - Total: 621
  - Density: 147.4/sq mi (56.93/km^{2})
- Time zone: UTC-9 (Alaska (AKST))
  - Summer (DST): UTC-8 (AKDT)
- ZIP code: 99632
- Area code: 907
- FIPS code: 02-51180
- GNIS feature ID: 1406655

Mountain Village (Central Yupik: Asaacaryaraq) is a city in Kusilvak Census Area, Alaska, United States, located on the Yukon River near the Yukon-Kuskokwim Delta. As of the 2020 census, Mountain Village had a population of 621.

== Geography ==
Mountain Village is located at 62°5′24″N 163°43′26″W (62.090075, -163.723936).

According to the United States Census Bureau, the city has a total area of 4.80 square miles (12.4 km^{2}), all of it land.

=== Climate ===
Mountain Village has a subarctic climate (Dfc) with short, mild summers with cool nights and long, cold winters. Precipitation peaks during August.

Climate data for Mountain Village, Alaska
Month	Jan	Feb	Mar	Apr	May	Jun	Jul	Aug	Sep	Oct	Nov	Dec	Year
Record high °F (°C)	43 (6)	41 (5)	46 (8)	55 (13)	72 (22)	82 (28)	83 (28)	75 (24)	65 (18)	60 (16)	45 (7)	39 (4)	83 (28)
Mean daily maximum °F (°C)	12.6 (−10.8)	13.9 (−10.1)	19.3 (−7.1)	30.4 (−0.9)	47.7 (8.7)	59.6 (15.3)	61.5 (16.4)	58.3 (14.6)	50.4 (10.2)	36.3 (2.4)	24.6 (−4.1)	8.9 (−12.8)	35.3 (1.8)
Daily mean °F (°C)	5.6 (−14.7)	6.6 (−14.1)	11.1 (−11.6)	22.6 (−5.2)	39.5 (4.2)	50.7 (10.4)	53.7 (12.1)	51.9 (11.1)	43.8 (6.6)	30.3 (−0.9)	18.7 (−7.4)	2.4 (−16.4)	28.1 (−2.2)
Mean daily minimum °F (°C)	−1.5 (−18.6)	−0.7 (−18.2)	2.8 (−16.2)	14.7 (−9.6)	31.2 (−0.4)	41.8 (5.4)	45.8 (7.7)	45.5 (7.5)	37.1 (2.8)	24.3 (−4.3)	12.8 (−10.7)	−4.2 (−20.1)	20.8 (−6.2)
Record low °F (°C)	−44 (−42)	−42 (−41)	−41 (−41)	−24 (−31)	5 (−15)	27 (−3)	31 (−1)	30 (−1)	19 (−7)	−2 (−19)	−33 (−36)	−36 (−38)	−44 (−42)
Average precipitation inches (mm)	0.78 (20)	0.61 (15)	0.56 (14)	0.40 (10)	0.60 (15)	1.17 (30)	2.16 (55)	4.73 (120)	3.00 (76)	1.01 (26)	0.81 (21)	0.64 (16)	16.47 (418)
Source: WRCC

== Demographics ==
Historical population
Census	Pop.	Note	%±
1920	136		—
1930	76		−44.1%
1940	128		68.4%
1950	221		72.7%
1960	300		35.7%
1970	419		39.7%
1980	583		39.1%
1990	674		15.6%
2000	755		12.0%
2010	813		7.7%
2020	621		−23.6%
U.S. Decennial Census

Mountain Village first appeared on the 1920 U.S. Census as the unincorporated village of "Mountain." It continued to report as Mountain until its incorporation as Mountain Village in 1967.

=== 2020 census ===
As of the 2020 census, Mountain Village had a population of 621. The median age was 29.0 years. 33.7% of residents were under the age of 18 and 6.8% of residents were 65 years of age or older. For every 100 females there were 103.6 males, and for every 100 females age 18 and over there were 108.1 males age 18 and over.

0.0% of residents lived in urban areas, while 100.0% lived in rural areas.

There were 174 households in Mountain Village, of which 55.7% had children under the age of 18 living in them. Of all households, 35.6% were married-couple households, 20.7% were households with a male householder and no spouse or partner present, and 24.7% were households with a female householder and no spouse or partner present. About 15.0% of all households were made up of individuals and 1.7% had someone living alone who was 65 years of age or older.

There were 198 housing units, of which 12.1% were vacant. The homeowner vacancy rate was 4.7% and the rental vacancy rate was 9.8%.

Racial composition as of the 2020 census
Race	Number	Percent
White	19	3.1%
Black or African American	6	1.0%
American Indian and Alaska Native	585	94.2%
Asian	3	0.5%
Native Hawaiian and Other Pacific Islander	0	0.0%
Some other race	1	0.2%
Two or more races	7	1.1%
Hispanic or Latino (of any race)	0	0.0%

=== 2000 census ===
As of the census of 2000, there were 755 people, 183 households, and 146 families residing in the city. The population density was 173.7 inhabitants per square mile (67.1/km^{2}). There were 211 housing units at an average density of 48.5 units per square mile (18.7 units/km^{2}). The racial makeup of the city was 6.36% White, 90.46% Native American, 0.13% Pacific Islander, and 3.05% from two or more races. 0.40% of the population were Hispanic or Latino of any race.

There were 183 households, out of which 56.8% had children under the age of 18 living with them, 46.4% were married couples living together, 21.3% had a female householder with no husband present, and 19.7% were non-families. 17.5% of all households were made up of individuals, and 1.6% had someone living alone who was 65 years of age or older. The average household size was 4.13 and the average family size was 4.69.

In the city, the age distribution of the population shows 42.4% under the age of 18, 9.9% from 18 to 24, 29.3% from 25 to 44, 13.5% from 45 to 64, and 4.9% who were 65 years of age or older. The median age was 23 years. For every 100 females, there were 98.2 males. For every 100 females age 18 and over, there were 96.8 males.

The median income for a household in the city was $31,250, and the median income for a family was $30,000. Males had a median income of $34,375 versus $32,917 for females. The per capita income for the city was $9,653. About 21.1% of families and 22.2% of the population were below the poverty line, including 30.1% of those under age 18 and none of those age 65 or over.

== Education ==
K-12 students attend Mountain Village School, operated by the Lower Yukon School District. The district is headquartered in Mountain Village.
