= Nunam Iqua, Alaska =

Nunam Iqua Sheldon Point
- City
- Location within the state of Alaska
- Coordinates: 62°30′58″N 164°53′43″W
- Country: United States
- State: Alaska
- Census Area: Kusilvak
- Incorporated: 1974

Government
  - Mayor: Edward Abrahamson, Jr.
  - State senator: Donald Olson (D)
  - State rep.: Neal Foster (D)

Area
  - Total: 18.10 sq mi (46.88 km^{2})
  - Land: 11.57 sq mi (29.96 km^{2})
  - Water: 6.53 sq mi (16.91 km^{2})

Population (2020)
  - Total: 217
  - Density: 18.8/sq mi (7.24/km^{2})
- ZIP code: 99666
- Area code: 907
- FIPS code: 02-56600

Nunam Iqua, formerly called Sheldon Point, is a city in the Kusilvak Census Area in the U.S. state of Alaska. As of the 2020 census, Nunam Iqua had a population of 217.

Nunam Iqua is a Yupik name meaning "land's end" (nuna = "land"; iquk = "end"). A man named Sheldon opened a fish saltery there in the 1930s, and the city was incorporated under the name Sheldon Point in 1974. The name was changed to Nunam Iqua in a November 1999 referendum.

== Geography ==
Nunam Iqua is located at 62°30′58″N 164°53′43″W (62.516094, -164.895198).

According to the United States Census Bureau, the city has a total area of 18.5 square miles (48 km^{2}), of which, 13.2 square miles (34 km^{2}) of it is land and 5.3 square miles (14 km^{2}) of it (28.80%) is water.

== Demographics ==
Historical population
Census	Pop.	Note	%±
1950	43		—
1960	125		190.7%
1970	125		0.0%
1980	103		−17.6%
1990	109		5.8%
2000	164		50.5%
2010	187		14.0%
2020	217		16.0%
U.S. Decennial Census

Nunam Iqua first appeared on the 1950 U.S. Census as the unincorporated village of "Sheldon's Point." In 1960, it reported as Sheldon Point. In 1974, it formally incorporated as Sheldon Point. In 1999, the name was changed to Nunam Iqua.

=== 2020 census ===
As of the 2020 census, Nunam Iqua had a population of 217. The median age was 21.7 years. 43.8% of residents were under the age of 18 and 5.5% of residents were 65 years of age or older. For every 100 females there were 114.9 males, and for every 100 females age 18 and over there were 106.8 males age 18 and over.

0.0% of residents lived in urban areas, while 100.0% lived in rural areas.

There were 44 households in Nunam Iqua, of which 56.8% had children under the age of 18 living in them. Of all households, 29.5% were married-couple households, 25.0% were households with a male householder and no spouse or partner present, and 31.8% were households with a female householder and no spouse or partner present. About 18.2% of all households were made up of individuals and 2.3% had someone living alone who was 65 years of age or older.

There were 58 housing units, of which 24.1% were vacant. The homeowner vacancy rate was 8.3% and the rental vacancy rate was 0.0%.

Racial composition as of the 2020 census
Race	Number	Percent
White	2	0.9%
Black or African American	2	0.9%
American Indian and Alaska Native	203	93.5%
Asian	0	0.0%
Native Hawaiian and Other Pacific Islander	0	0.0%
Some other race	0	0.0%
Two or more races	10	4.6%
Hispanic or Latino (of any race)	1	0.5%

=== 2000 census ===
As of the census of 2000, there were 164 people, 35 households, and 26 families residing in the city. The population density was 12.4 inhabitants per square mile (4.8/km^{2}). There were 45 housing units at an average density of 3.4 per square mile (1.3/km^{2}). The racial makeup of the city was 5.49% White, 0.61% Black or African American, 90.24% Native American, and 3.66% from two or more races.

There were 35 households, out of which 57.1% had children under the age of 18 living with them, 31.4% were married couples living together, 28.6% had a female householder with no husband present, and 22.9% were non-families. 17.1% of all households were made up of individuals, and none had someone living alone who was 65 years of age or older. The average household size was 4.69 and the average family size was 5.22.

In the city the population was spread out, with 51.8% under the age of 18, 8.5% from 18 to 24, 23.8% from 25 to 44, 11.6% from 45 to 64, and 4.3% who were 65 years of age or older. The median age was 17 years. For every 100 females there were 124.7 males. For every 100 females age 18 and over, there were 97.5 males.

The median income for a household in the city was $29,000, and the median income for a family was $26,250. Males had a median income of $48,750 versus $24,375 for females. The per capita income for the city was $6,725. About 40.6% of families and 36.3% of the population were below the poverty line, including 40.9% of those under the age of eighteen and none of those 65 or over.

== Education ==
K-12 students attend Nunam Iqua School, operated by the Lower Yukon School District.
