= Quinhagak Airport =

Quinhagak Airport Kwinhagak Airport
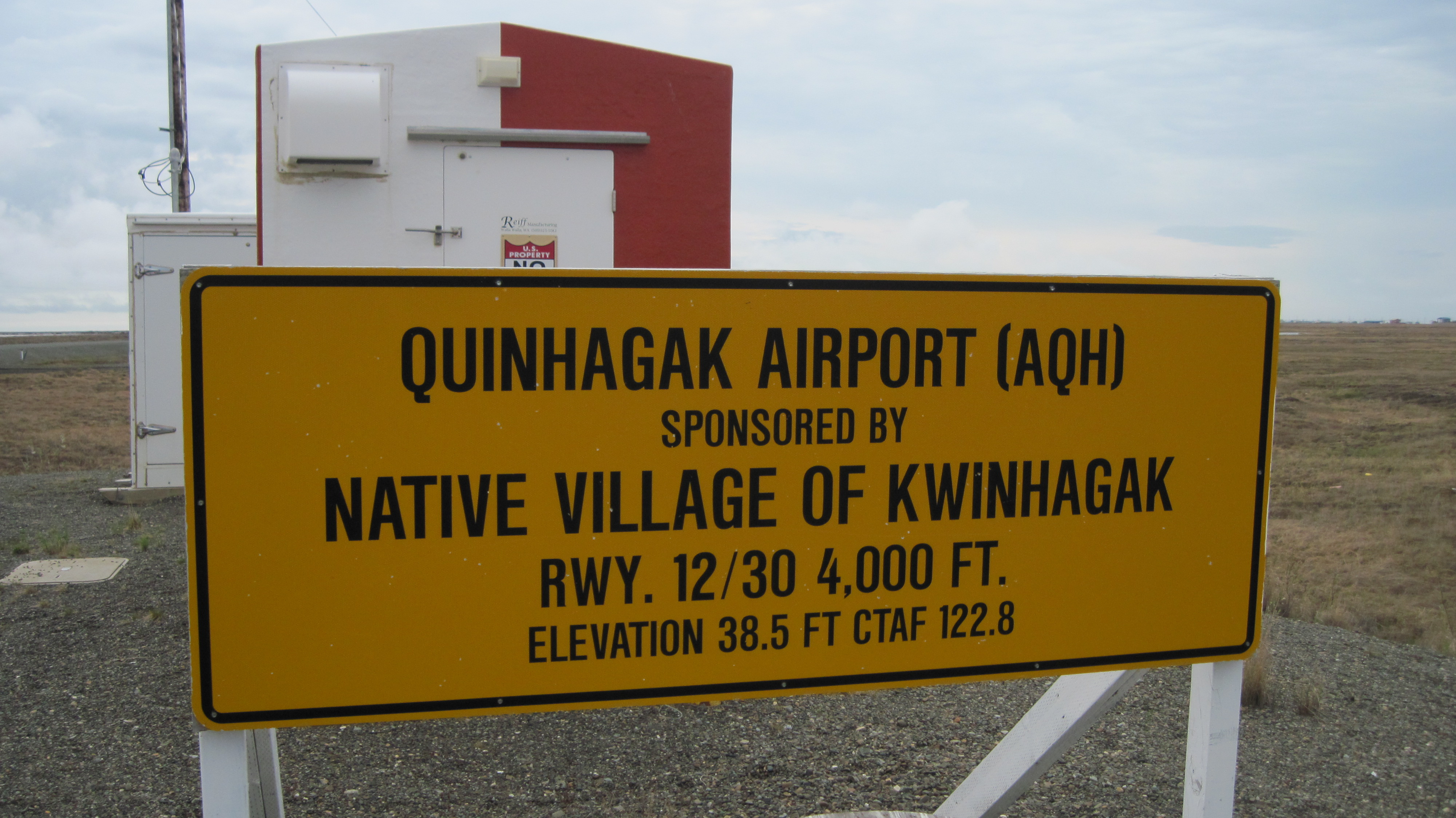
- IATA: KWN; ICAO: PAQH; FAA LID: AQH

Summary
- Airport type: Public
- Owner: Native Village of Kwinhagak
- Serves: Quinhagak, Alaska
- Elevation AMSL: 42 ft / 13 m
- Coordinates: 59°45′18″N 161°50′43″W

Map
- Location of airport in Alaska

Runways
Direction	Length		Surface
Direction	ft	m	Surface
12/30	4,000	1,219	Gravel
- Source: Federal Aviation Administration

Quinhagak Airport (IATA: KWN, ICAO: PAQH, FAA LID: AQH), is a public-use airport located two nautical miles (3.7 km) east of the central business district of Quinhagak (also spelled Kwinhagak), a city in the Bethel Census Area of the U.S. state of Alaska. It is also known as Kwinhagak Airport.

Although most U.S. airports use the same three-letter location identifier for the FAA and IATA, this airport is assigned AQH by the FAA and KWN by the IATA. The airport's ICAO identifier is PAQH.

== Facilities ==
Quinhagak Airport covers an area of 123 acres (50 ha) at an elevation of 42 feet (13 m) above mean sea level. It has one runway designated 12/30 with a gravel surface measuring 4,000 by 75 feet (1,219 x 23 m). The runway was expanded from its former size of 2,600 by 60 feet (792 m × 18 m).

== Airlines and destinations ==
Airlines	Destinations
Grant Aviation	Bethel

=== Top destinations ===
Busiest domestic routes out of KWN (July 2010 - June 2011)
Rank	City	Passengers	Carriers
1	(Alaska) Bethel, AK	4,000	Yute, Grant, Hageland
2	(Alaska) Eek, AK	1,000	Grant, Hageland

== See also ==
- List of airports in Alaska
