= Kotlik, Alaska =

Kotlik Qerrulliik (Central Yupik) Котлик (Russian)
- City
- Location in Alaska
- Coordinates: 63°2′9″N 163°33′37″W
- Country: United States
- State: Alaska
- Census Area: Kusilvak
- Incorporated: October 28, 1970

Government
  - Mayor: Mary Ann Mike
  - State senator: Donny Olson (D)
  - State rep.: Neal Foster (D)

Area
  - Total: 3.50 sq mi (9.06 km^{2})
  - Land: 2.99 sq mi (7.75 km^{2})
  - Water: 0.51 sq mi (1.31 km^{2})
- Elevation: 0 ft (0 m)

Population (2020)
  - Total: 655
  - Density: 218.8/sq mi (84.47/km^{2})
- Time zone: UTC-9 (Alaska (AKST))
  - Summer (DST): UTC-8 (AKDT)
- ZIP code: 99620
- Area code: 907
- FIPS code: 02-41720
- GNIS feature ID: 1404964

Kotlik (Central Yupik: Qerrulliik, Russian: Котлик) is a city in Kusilvak Census Area, Alaska, United States. As of the 2020 census, Kotlik had a population of 655.

== Geography ==
Kotlik is located at 63°02′09″N 163°33′37″W. Kotlik is located on the east bank of the Kotlik Slough, 35 miles northeast of Emmonak in the Yukon-Kuskokwim Delta.

According to the United States Census Bureau, the city has a total area of 4.7 square miles (12 km^{2}), of which 3.8 square miles (9.8 km^{2}) is land and 0.8 square miles (2.1 km^{2}) (17.85%) is water. The climate of Kotlik is subarctic. Temperatures range between -50 and 87. There is an average of 60 inches of snowfall and 16 inches of precipitation annually.

The Yupik village of Bill Moore's Slough is contained within Kotlik.

== Demographics ==
Historical population
Census	Pop.	Note	%±
1880	8		—
1890	31		287.5%
1920	83		—
1930	14		−83.1%
1940	35		150.0%
1950	44		25.7%
1960	57		29.5%
1970	228		300.0%
1980	293		28.5%
1990	461		57.3%
2000	591		28.2%
2010	577		−2.4%
2020	655		13.5%
U.S. Decennial Census

Kotlik first appeared on the 1880 U.S. Census as an unincorporated Inuit village of 8 residents. In 1890, it reported 31 residents, of which 9 were native (presumably Inuit) and 22 were "Creole" (mixed Native and Russian). It did not report again on the census until 1920. It was formally incorporated as a city in 1970.

=== 2020 census ===
As of the 2020 census, Kotlik had a population of 655. The median age was 23.7 years. 40.2% of residents were under the age of 18 and 6.6% of residents were 65 years of age or older. For every 100 females there were 114.1 males, and for every 100 females age 18 and over there were 107.4 males age 18 and over.

0.0% of residents lived in urban areas, while 100.0% lived in rural areas.

There were 134 households in Kotlik, of which 68.7% had children under the age of 18 living in them. Of all households, 31.3% were married-couple households, 20.1% were households with a male householder and no spouse or partner present, and 27.6% were households with a female householder and no spouse or partner present. About 13.4% of all households were made up of individuals and 4.5% had someone living alone who was 65 years of age or older.

There were 150 housing units, of which 10.7% were vacant. The homeowner vacancy rate was 0.0% and the rental vacancy rate was 0.0%.

Racial composition as of the 2020 census
Race	Number	Percent
White	1	0.2%
Black or African American	0	0.0%
American Indian and Alaska Native	653	99.7%
Asian	0	0.0%
Native Hawaiian and Other Pacific Islander	0	0.0%
Some other race	0	0.0%
Two or more races	1	0.2%
Hispanic or Latino (of any race)	0	0.0%

=== 2000 census ===
As of the census of 2000, there were 591 people, 117 households, and 102 families residing in the city. The population density was 154.8 inhabitants per square mile (59.8/km^{2}). There were 139 housing units at an average density of 36.4 per square mile (14.1/km^{2}). The racial makeup of the city was 3.55% White, 93.57% Native American, and 2.88% from two or more races. 0.34% of the population were Hispanic or Latino of any race.

There were 117 households, out of which 70.1% had children under the age of 18 living with them, 65.0% were married couples living together, 11.1% had a female householder with no husband present, and 12.8% were non-families. 10.3% of all households were made up of individuals, and 3.4% had someone living alone who was 65 years of age or older. The average household size was 5.05, and the average family size was 5.48.

In the city, the age distribution of the population shows 48.2% under the age of 18, 11.2% from 18 to 24, 24.9% from 25 to 44, 12.0% from 45 to 64, and 3.7% who were 65 years of age or older. The median age was 18 years. For every 100 females, there were 114.1 males. For every 100 females age 18 and over, there were 109.6 males.

The median income for a household in the city was $37,750, and the median income for a family was $37,969. Males had a median income of $29,583 versus $16,875 for females. The per capita income for the city was $7,707. About 18.4% of families and 21.1% of the population were below the poverty line, including 21.8% of those under age 18 and 25.9% of those age 65 or over.

== Education ==
K–12 students attend Kotlik School, operated by the Lower Yukon School District.

== Health ==
Sale, importation, and possession of alcohol are banned in the village.
