= Emmonak, Alaska =

Emmonak Imangaq
- City
- Location in Alaska
- Coordinates: 62°46′38″N 164°32′42″W
- Country: United States
- State: Alaska
- Census area: Kusilvak
- Incorporated: February 13, 1964

Government
  - Mayor: Martina R. Redfox
  - State senator: Donny Olson (D)
  - State rep.: Neal Foster (D)

Area
  - Total: 5.91 sq mi (15.31 km^{2})
  - Land: 4.97 sq mi (12.86 km^{2})
  - Water: 0.94 sq mi (2.44 km^{2})
- Elevation: 6.6 ft (2 m)

Population (2020)
  - Total: 825
  - Density: 166.1/sq mi (64.14/km^{2})
- Time zone: UTC-9 (Alaska (AKST))
  - Summer (DST): UTC-8 (AKDT)
- ZIP code: 99581
- Area code: 907
- FIPS code: 02-22910
- GNIS feature ID: 1401837

Emmonak (Central Yupik: Imangaq), colloquially known as Emmo (/ˈiːmoʊ/), is a city in Kusilvak Census Area, Alaska, United States. As of the 2020 census, Emmonak had a population of 825.

== Geography and climate ==
Emmonak is located in the large delta of the Yukon River at 62°46′38″N 164°32′42″W (62.777328, -164.544920).

According to the United States Census Bureau, the city has a total area of 8.6 square miles (22 km^{2}), of which 7.5 square miles (19 km^{2}) is land and 1.1 square miles (2.8 km^{2}) (13.08%) is water.

Emmonak is one of the last permanent settlements along the Yukon before it empties out into the Bering Sea.

Climate data for Emmonak, Alaska (1971–2000 normals, extremes 1977–1994)
Month	Jan	Feb	Mar	Apr	May	Jun	Jul	Aug	Sep	Oct	Nov	Dec	Year
Record high °F (°C)	39 (4)	46 (8)	44 (7)	54 (12)	73 (23)	80 (27)	80 (27)	80 (27)	67 (19)	57 (14)	43 (6)	40 (4)	80 (27)
Mean maximum °F (°C)	33.7 (0.9)	33.6 (0.9)	38.1 (3.4)	42.5 (5.8)	59.1 (15.1)	70.2 (21.2)	71.8 (22.1)	71.1 (21.7)	59.9 (15.5)	47.3 (8.5)	37.5 (3.1)	34.1 (1.2)	76.1 (24.5)
Mean daily maximum °F (°C)	14.5 (−9.7)	15.0 (−9.4)	22.6 (−5.2)	30.7 (−0.7)	45.1 (7.3)	57.2 (14.0)	61.5 (16.4)	58.6 (14.8)	50.5 (10.3)	36.4 (2.4)	23.1 (−4.9)	16.9 (−8.4)	36.1 (2.3)
Daily mean °F (°C)	6.5 (−14.2)	6.7 (−14.1)	14.1 (−9.9)	21.9 (−5.6)	37.0 (2.8)	49.2 (9.6)	54.5 (12.5)	52.5 (11.4)	44.6 (7.0)	30.6 (−0.8)	18.4 (−7.6)	9.8 (−12.3)	28.8 (−1.8)
Mean daily minimum °F (°C)	0.4 (−17.6)	−0.9 (−18.3)	4.6 (−15.2)	13.5 (−10.3)	29.4 (−1.4)	41.1 (5.1)	47.4 (8.6)	45.2 (7.3)	37.4 (3.0)	25.6 (−3.6)	11.6 (−11.3)	3.8 (−15.7)	21.7 (−5.7)
Mean minimum °F (°C)	−25.9 (−32.2)	−26.6 (−32.6)	−19.1 (−28.4)	−7.8 (−22.1)	14.7 (−9.6)	31.6 (−0.2)	39.1 (3.9)	35.6 (2.0)	27.9 (−2.3)	8.6 (−13.0)	−7.5 (−21.9)	−21.8 (−29.9)	−33.7 (−36.5)
Record low °F (°C)	−50 (−46)	−41 (−41)	−40 (−40)	−19 (−28)	−7 (−22)	21 (−6)	34 (1)	28 (−2)	19 (−7)	−5 (−21)	−29 (−34)	−30 (−34)	−50 (−46)
Average precipitation inches (mm)	1.15 (29)	0.94 (24)	1.10 (28)	0.71 (18)	1.03 (26)	1.57 (40)	2.15 (55)	3.06 (78)	2.92 (74)	1.72 (44)	1.49 (38)	1.35 (34)	19.19 (487)
Average snowfall inches (cm)	8.9 (23)	7.9 (20)	8.7 (22)	3.2 (8.1)	1.3 (3.3)	trace	0.0 (0.0)	0.0 (0.0)	0.1 (0.25)	4.4 (11)	12.4 (31)	11.9 (30)	58.8 (149)
Average precipitation days (≥ 0.01 inch)	7.9	6.3	6.9	5.1	7.3	8.8	12.8	14.1	14.3	11.6	11.4	8.7	115.2
Average snowy days (≥ 0.1 inch)	6.9	6.1	6.3	3.3	1.2	0.0	0.0	0.0	0.1	5.2	9.2	9.2	47.5
Source 1: WRCC
Source 2: XMACIS (snowfall)

== Demographics ==
Historical population
Census	Pop.	Note	%±
1970	439		—
1980	567		29.2%
1990	642		13.2%
2000	767		19.5%
2010	762		−0.7%
2020	825		8.3%
U.S. Decennial Census

Emmonak first appeared on the 1970 U.S. Census as an incorporated city (having incorporated in 1964), although it was erroneously called "Emanguk". It was the successor community to Kwiguk, which was located a mile and a half south, most of whose residents moved to the new village of Emmonak in 1964 after flooding damaged the old village, including their cannery.

=== 2020 census ===
As of the 2020 census, Emmonak had a population of 825. The median age was 25.6 years. 37.6% of residents were under the age of 18 and 6.2% of residents were 65 years of age or older. For every 100 females there were 128.5 males, and for every 100 females age 18 and over there were 139.5 males age 18 and over.

0.0% of residents lived in urban areas, while 100.0% lived in rural areas.

There were 213 households in Emmonak, of which 57.3% had children under the age of 18 living in them. Of all households, 35.2% were married-couple households, 32.9% were households with a male householder and no spouse or partner present, and 17.4% were households with a female householder and no spouse or partner present. About 19.3% of all households were made up of individuals and 2.3% had someone living alone who was 65 years of age or older.

There were 221 housing units, of which 3.6% were vacant. The homeowner vacancy rate was 0.0% and the rental vacancy rate was 6.6%.

Racial composition as of the 2020 census
Race	Number	Percent
White	23	2.8%
Black or African American	1	0.1%
American Indian and Alaska Native	759	92.0%
Asian	2	0.2%
Native Hawaiian and Other Pacific Islander	0	0.0%
Some other race	0	0.0%
Two or more races	40	4.8%
Hispanic or Latino (of any race)	2	0.2%

=== 2000 census ===
As of the census of 2000, there were 767 people, 189 households, and 150 families residing in the city. The population density was 102.2 inhabitants per square mile (39.5/km^{2}). There were 218 housing units at an average density of 29.0 units per square mile (11.2 units/km^{2}). The racial makeup of the city was 5.61% White, 0.26% Black or African American, 91.26% Native American, 0.13% Asian, and 2.74% from two or more races. 1.04% of the population were Hispanic or Latino of any race.

There were 189 households, out of which 55.6% had children under the age of 18 living with them, 47.1% were married couples living together, 18.0% had a female householder with no husband present, and 20.6% were non-families. 16.9% of all households were made up of individuals, and 3.2% had someone living alone who was 65 years of age or older. The average household size was 4.06, and the average family size was 4.58.

In the city, the age distribution of the population shows 44.1% under the age of 18, 8.3% from 18 to 24, 27.2% from 25 to 44, 15.4% from 45 to 64, and 5.0% who were 65 years of age or older. The median age was 23 years. For every 100 females, there were 116.7 males. For every 100 females age 18 and over, there were 113.4 males.

The median income for a household in the city was $32,917, and the median income for a family was $38,750. Males had a median income of $23,750 versus $18,542 for females. The per capita income for the city was $9,069. About 16.4% of families and 16.2% of the population were below the poverty line, including 15.9% of those under age 18 and 9.1% of those age 65 or over.

== Winter 2008–2009 energy crisis ==
In the winter of 2008–2009, a combination of a cold winter and increased fuel prices led to economic hardship. Due to a collapse in local king salmon fisheries in 2008, residents were unable to buy increased amounts of heating oil at higher prices. On January 10, 2009, Nicholas C. Tucker Sr., a town elder, circulated a letter asking for aid. The letter was circulated by Alaska bloggers, where it was picked up by national media.

== Education ==
K–12 students attend Emmonak School, operated by the Lower Yukon School District.
