= Kusilvak Census Area, Alaska =

Census area in Alaska, United States

- Borough
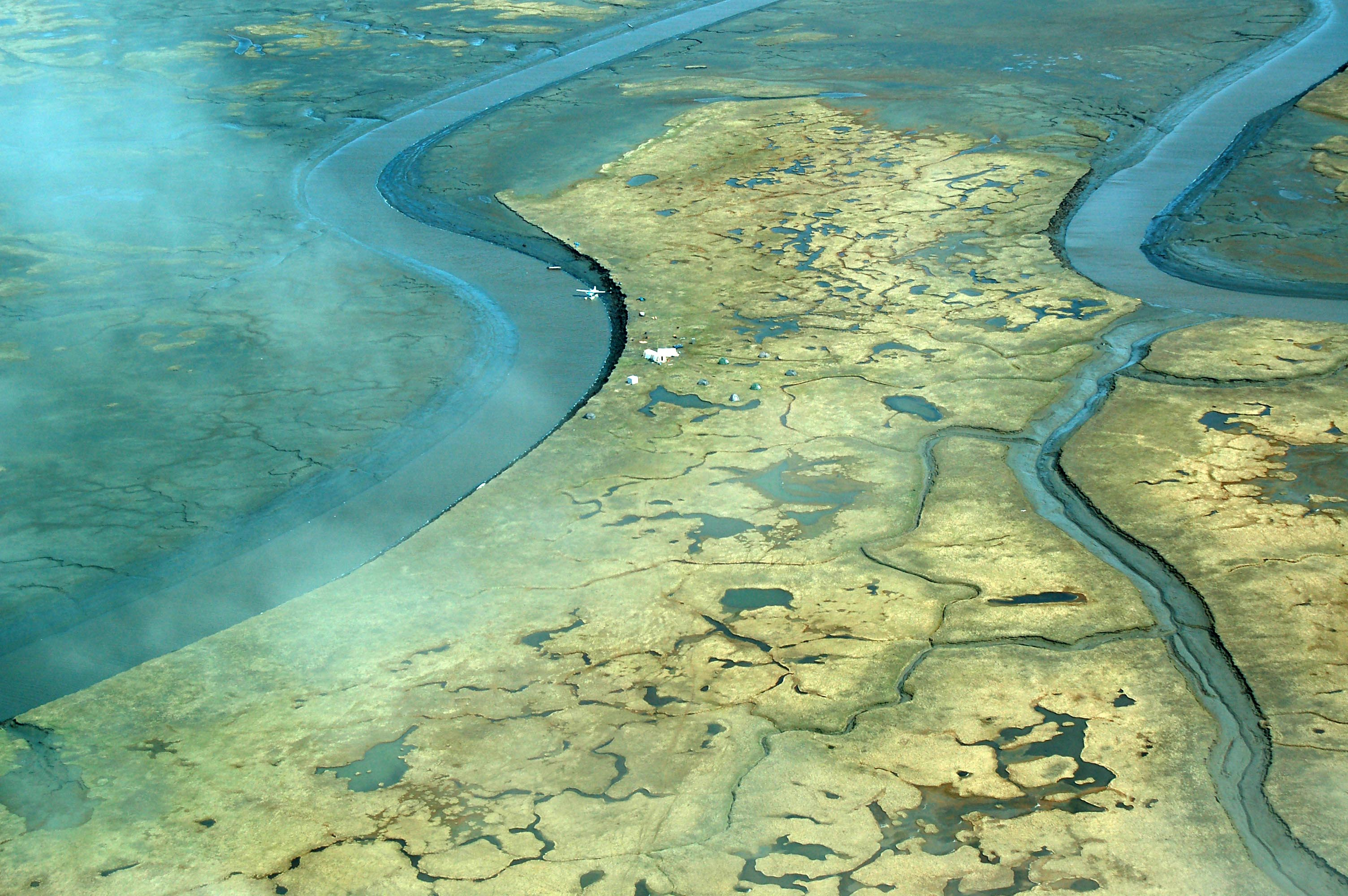
- Aerial view of Tutakoke Bird Camp, Coast of the Bering Sea just south of Hooper Bay, near Chevak, Alaska.

- Location within the U.S. state of Alaska
- Coordinates: 62°05′N 163°32′W
- Country: United States
- State: Alaska
- Established: 1980
- Named for: Kusilvak Mountains
- Largest city: Hooper Bay

Area
  - Total: 19,673 sq mi (50,950 km^{2})
  - Land: 17,081 sq mi (44,240 km^{2})
  - Water: 2,592 sq mi (6,710 km^{2}) 13.2%

Population (2020)
  - Total: 8,368
  - Estimate (2025): 7,932 ▼
  - Density: 0.44/sq mi (0.17/km^{2})
- Time zone: UTC−9 (Alaska)
  - Summer (DST): UTC−8 (ADT)
- Congressional district: At-large

Kusilvak Census Area, formerly known as Wade Hampton Census Area, is a census area located in the U.S. state of Alaska. As of the 2020 census, the population was 8,368, up from 7,459 in 2010. It is part of the Unorganized Borough and therefore has no borough seat. Its largest community is the city of Hooper Bay, on the Bering Sea coast.

The census area's per capita income makes it the fourth-poorest county-equivalent in the United States. In 2014, it had the highest percentage of unemployed people of any county or census area in the United States, at 23.7 percent.

Additionally the area has the largest percentage of indigenous people with 96.9% of the population belonging to an indigenous group.

== History ==
The census area was originally named for Wade Hampton III, a South Carolina politician whose son-in-law, John Randolph Tucker, a territorial judge in Nome, posthumously named a mining district in western Alaska for him in 1913. The district eventually became the census area, retaining its name. Over the next century, the name became increasingly controversial, with Native residents and others arguing Hampton's name did not represent Alaska and that his personal history as a slave-holding Civil War general was a blemish on the region. In July 2015, Alaska Governor Bill Walker formally notified the U.S. Census Bureau that the census area was being renamed after the Kusilvak Mountains, its highest range.

== Geography ==
According to the U.S. Census Bureau, the census area has a total area of 19,673 square miles (50,950 km^{2}), of which 17,081 square miles (44,240 km^{2}) is land and 2,592 square miles (6,710 km^{2}) (13.2%) is water.

=== Adjacent boroughs and census areas ===
- Nome Census Area, Alaska – north
- Yukon–Koyukuk Census Area, Alaska – east
- Bethel Census Area, Alaska – south

=== National protected area ===
- Yukon Delta National Wildlife Refuge (part)
  - Andreafsky Wilderness (part)

== Demographics ==
Historical population
Census	Pop.	Note	%±
1960	3,128		—
1970	3,917		25.2%
1980	4,665		19.1%
1990	5,791		24.1%
2000	7,028		21.4%
2010	7,459		6.1%
2020	8,368		12.2%
2025 (est.)	7,932	▼	−5.2%
U.S. Decennial Census; 1790–1960 1900–1990; 1990–2000 2010–2020

=== 2020 census ===
As of the 2020 census, the county had a population of 8,368. The median age was 23.7 years; 40.9% of residents were under the age of 18 and 6.5% of residents were 65 years of age or older. For every 100 females there were 109.8 males, and for every 100 females age 18 and over there were 108.5 males age 18 and over.

The racial makeup of the county was 2.1% White, 0.2% Black or African American, 95.0% American Indian and Alaska Native, 0.3% Asian, 0.0% Native Hawaiian and Pacific Islander, 0.2% from some other race, and 2.3% from two or more races. Hispanic or Latino residents of any race comprised 0.2% of the population.

0.0% of residents lived in urban areas, while 100.0% lived in rural areas.

There were 1,943 households in the county, of which 63.4% had children under the age of 18 living with them and 26.4% had a female householder with no spouse or partner present. About 17.5% of all households were made up of individuals and 3.8% had someone living alone who was 65 years of age or older.

There were 2,342 housing units, of which 17.0% were vacant. Among occupied housing units, 71.6% were owner-occupied and 28.4% were renter-occupied. The homeowner vacancy rate was 0.8% and the rental vacancy rate was 4.3%.

=== Racial and ethnic composition ===
Kusilvak Census Area, Alaska – Racial and ethnic composition Note: the US Census treats Hispanic/Latino as an ethnic category. This table excludes Latinos from the racial categories and assigns them to a separate category. Hispanics/Latinos may be of any race.
Race / Ethnicity (NH = Non-Hispanic)	Pop 1980	Pop 1990	Pop 2000	Pop 2010	Pop 2020	% 1980	% 1990	% 2000	% 2010	% 2020
White alone (NH)	286	342	330	199	173	6.13%	5.91%	4.70%	2.67%	2.07%
Black or African American alone (NH)	3	12	4	1	16	0.06%	0.21%	0.06%	0.01%	0.19%
Native American or Alaska Native alone (NH)	4,347	5,397	6,486	7,082	7,946	93.18%	93.20%	92.29%	94.95%	94.96%
Asian alone (NH)	8	22	7	17	23	0.17%	0.38%	0.10%	0.23%	0.27%
Native Hawaiian or Pacific Islander alone (NH)	x	x	1	0	0	x	x	0.01%	0.00%	0.00%
Other race alone (NH)	11	1	1	3	14	0.24%	0.02%	0.01%	0.04%	0.17%
Mixed race or Multiracial (NH)	x	x	176	150	182	x	x	2.50%	2.01%	2.17%
Hispanic or Latino (any race)	10	17	23	7	14	0.21%	0.29%	0.33%	0.09%	0.17%
Total	4,665	5,791	7,028	7,459	8,368	100.00%	100.00%	100.00%	100.00%	100.00%

The most reported detailed ancestries were:

- Native Village of Hooper Bay (Naparyarmiut) (14.3%)
- Yup'ik (Yup'ik Eskimo) (10.4%)
- Village of Alakanuk (7.9%)
- Asa'carsarmiut Tribe (7%)
- Chevak Native Village (6.6%)
- Emmonak Village (4.8%)
- Iqugmuit Traditional Council (4.4%)
- Village of Kotlik (4.3%)
- Algaaciq Native Village (St. Mary's) (3.7%)
- Native Village of Marshall (Fortuna Ledge) (3.4%)

=== 2000 census ===
As of the 2000 census, there were 7,028 people, 1,602 households, and 1,296 families residing in the census area. The population density was 0.35 people per square mile (0.14 people/km^{2}). There were 2,063 housing units at an average density of /sq mi (0/km^{2}). The racial makeup of the census area was 92.53% Native American, 4.74% White, 0.06% Black or African American, 0.10% Asian, 0.03% Pacific Islander, 0.03% from other races, and 2.52% from two or more races. 0.33% of the population were Hispanic or Latino of any race. 50.00% of the population reported speaking English at home, while 49.75% spoke Central Alaskan Yup'ik.

There were 1,602 households, out of which 59.70% had children under the age of 18 living with them, 47.40% were married couples living together, 20.30% had a female householder with no husband present, and 19.10% were non-families. Sixteen percent of all households were made up of individuals, and 1.80% had someone living alone who was 65 years of age or older. The average household size was 4.38 and the average family size was 4.95.

In the census area 46.60% of the population was under the age of 18 (the highest such percentage among county equivalents in the United States), 9.70% was from 18 to 24, 25.60% from 25 to 44, 13.10% from 45 to 64, and 5.00% was 65 years of age or older. The median age was 20 years, making the Census Area the youngest county in the United States. For every 100 females, there were 109.00 males. For every 100 females age 18 and over, there were 107.70 males.

The census area's per capita income makes it one of the poorest places in the United States.

=== 2006 American Community Survey ===
In the 2006 American community survey, the Kusilvak Census Area had the largest increase in Hispanic population since 2000 with a 1572.73% increase.

== Communities ==
=== Cities ===
- Alakanuk
- Chevak
- Emmonak
- Hooper Bay
- Kotlik
- Marshall
- Mountain Village
- Nunam Iqua (formerly Sheldon Point)
- Pilot Station
- Russian Mission
- Scammon Bay
- St. Mary's

=== Census-designated place ===
- Pitkas Point

=== Unincorporated communities ===
- Bill Moore's Slough
- Chuloonawick
- Hamilton
- Ohogamiut

== Politics ==
United States presidential election results for Kusilvak Census Area, Alaska
Year	Republican		Democratic		Third party(ies)	
Year	No.	%	No.	%	No.	%
1980	366	26.41%	866	62.48%	154	11.11%
1984	847	47.83%	850	48.00%	74	4.18%
1988	817	52.30%	681	43.60%	64	4.10%
1992	759	42.78%	700	39.46%	315	17.76%
1996	578	31.71%	1,001	54.91%	244	13.38%
2000	960	48.90%	831	42.33%	172	8.76%
2004	842	49.62%	753	44.37%	102	6.01%
2008	906	39.89%	1,269	55.88%	96	4.23%
2012	390	17.50%	1,715	76.97%	123	5.52%
2016	405	19.71%	1,215	59.12%	435	21.17%
2020	569	29.18%	1,209	62.00%	172	8.82%
2024	579	36.88%	820	52.23%	171	10.89%

Kusilvak Census Area, as with other Native-majority counties, is strongly Democratic. It has backed a Republican only four times in presidential elections, and exactly twice in gubernatorial elections.

== See also ==
- Kusilvak Census Area, Alaska topics
- List of mountain peaks of Alaska
