= Donny Olson =

American politician (born 1953)

Donald Olson
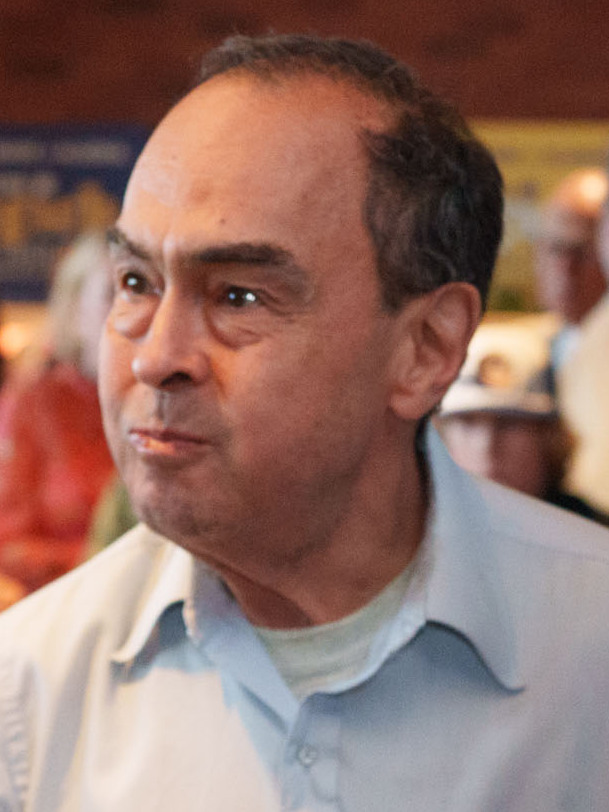
- Olson in 2026

Member of the Alaska Senate
- Incumbent
- Assumed office January 15, 2001
- Preceded by: Albert P. Adams
- Constituency: District S (2001–2003); District T (2003–present)

Personal details
- Born: June 18, 1953 (age 73) Nome, Territory of Alaska
- Party: Democratic
- Spouse: Willow
- Children: 7
- Education: University of Minnesota (BA); Oral Roberts University (MD); University of Colorado Law School (JD); University of Cambridge
- Profession: Physician; Aviator

Donald C. "Donny" Olson (born June 18, 1953) is an American physician, attorney, commercial pilot, reindeer herder, and politician, currently serving as a member of the Alaska Senate since 2001. Olson represents rural communities in Western Alaska and Arctic Alaska including Nome, Kotzebue, and Utqiagvik.

== Early life ==
Olson was born in the Inupiaq village of Golovin, Alaska, where he resides to date. He graduated from Covenant High School in Unalakleet, attended Seattle Pacific College; then the University of Minnesota, Duluth, where he received a B.A. in Chemistry; attended the University of Alaska, Fairbanks; the Oral Roberts University School of Medicine in Tulsa, Oklahoma, where he received his M.D., the University of Colorado School of Law for his Juris Doctor, and did postgraduate work in law at Cambridge University in England.

== Career ==
He is the president and CEO of Olson Air Service, based in Nome, Alaska.

He was appointed to the Alaska State Medical Board by Governor Tony Knowles in 1995 and served until taking office in the Alaska Senate in 2001. He was the sole Democrat associated with the Alaska political corruption probe. He was the only Alaska legislator to reject a bribe offer to vote for an oil tax bill. It was proposed as a campaign contribution of $25,000 for his 2004 Lieutenant Governor's race. He subsequently helped the FBI make their case against those involved.

Olson caucused with the Republicans in the majority during the 28th Senate, from 2013 to 2014, but he was not invited to participate in the organization of the majority caucus for the 29th Senate. He was a member of the Democratic minority caucus from 2015 to 2023. He is currently a member of the 17-member bipartisan majority.

== Personal life ==
Olson lives in Golovin, Alaska. In January 2025, he was hospitalized for a "stroke-like medical emergency" which left him with aphasia impairing his speaking ability.

== Electoral history ==
Nonpartisan primary
Party	Candidate	Votes	%
Democratic	Donny Olson (incumbent)	2,187	100

2024 Alaska Senate General election
Party	Candidate	Votes	%
Democratic	Donny Olson (incumbent)	6,273	97.63
Write-in		152	2.37
Total votes		6,425	100.0
Democratic hold			
Coalition hold			
