= Akiak Airport =

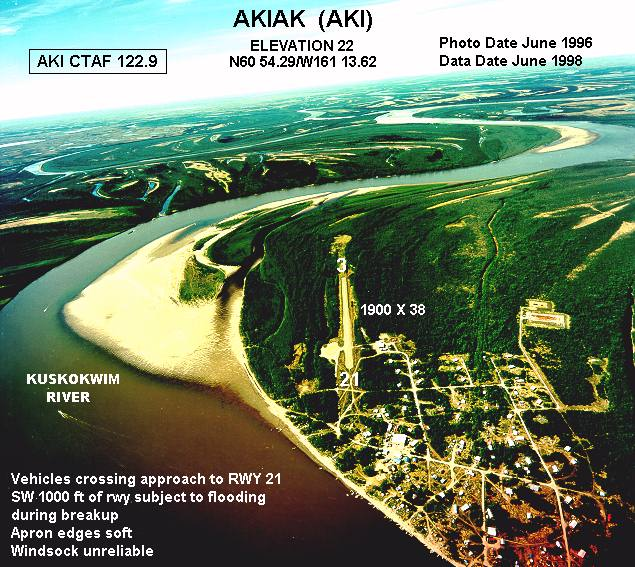
- IATA: AKI; ICAO: PFAK; FAA LID: AKI

Summary
- Airport type: Public
- Owner: State of Alaska DOT&PF - Central Region
- Serves: Akiak, Alaska
- Elevation AMSL: 30 ft (9.1 m)
- Coordinates: 60°54′10″N 161°13′50″W

Map
- Location of airport in Alaska

Runways
Direction	Length		Surface
Direction	ft	m	Surface
3/21	3,196	974	Gravel

Statistics (2015)
- Aircraft operations: 0
- Based aircraft: 0
- Passengers: 3,479
- Freight: 175,000 lbs
- Source: Federal Aviation Administration

Akiak Airport (IATA: AKI, ICAO: PFAK, FAA LID: AKI) is a state-owned public-use airport serving Akiak, a city in the Bethel Census Area of the U.S. state of Alaska.

According to Federal Aviation Administration records, this airport had 1,983 passenger boardings (enplanements) in calendar year 2007, an increase of 34% from the 1,483 enplanements in 2006.

== Facilities ==
Akiak Airport covers an area of 59 acres (24 ha) at an elevation of 30 feet (9 m) above mean sea level. It has one runway (3/21) with a gravel surface measuring 3,196 by 75 feet (974 x 23 m). The runway was extended and widened from its former size of 1,900 by 38 feet (579 by 12 m).

== Airlines and destinations ==
Airlines	Destinations
Yute Commuter Service	Akiachak, Bethel, Kwethluk, Tuluksak

=== Statistics ===
Carrier shares: January – December 2015
Carrier	Passengers (arriving and departing)
Hageland	2,610(75.02%)
Yute Air	720(20.58%)
Grant	150(4.40%)

Top domestic destinations: Jan. – Dec. 2015
Rank	City	Airport	Passengers
1	Bethel, AK	Bethel Airport (BET)	1,670
2	Akiachak, AK	Akiachak Airport (Z13)	60
3	Tuluksak, AK	Tuluksak Airport (KLN)	50
4	Upper Kalskag, AK	Kalskag Airport (KLG)	30
5	Kwethluk, AK	Kwethluk Airport (KWT)	20

== See also ==
- List of airports in Alaska
