= National Register of Historic Places listings in Bethel Census Area, Alaska =

Location of the Bethel Census Area in Alaska

This is a list of the National Register of Historic Places listings in Bethel Census Area, Alaska.

This is intended to be a complete list of the properties and districts on the National Register of Historic Places in Bethel Census Area, Alaska, United States. The locations of National Register properties and districts for which the latitude and longitude coordinates are included below, may be seen in a Google map.

There are seven properties and districts listed on the National Register in the census area.

This National Park Service list is complete through NPS recent listings posted October 30, 2026.

== Current listings ==
	Name on the Register	Image	Date listed	Location	City or town	Description
1	First Mission House	First Mission House	October 30, 1990 (#90001551)	291 3rd Avenue; 60°47′37″N 161°46′04″W	Bethel	
2	Kolmakov Redoubt Site		February 15, 1974 (#74002322)	Along the Kuskokwim River, 22 miles east of Aniak	Sleetmute	
3	St. Jacob's Church	St. Jacob's Church	June 6, 1980 (#80000748)	In Napaskiak; 60°42′30″N 161°45′48″W	Napaskiak	
4	St. Nicholas Russian Orthodox Church		April 15, 1991 (#91000385)	Lower Kuskokwim River; 60°48′43″N 161°26′15″W	Kwethluk	
5	St. Seraphim Chapel	St. Seraphim Chapel	June 6, 1980 (#80004586)	In Lower Kalskag; 61°30′50″N 160°21′59″W	Lower Kalskag	
6	St. Sergius Chapel	St. Sergius Chapel	June 6, 1980 (#80004585)	In Chuathbaluk; 61°34′18″N 159°14′38″W	Chuathbaluk	
7	Sts. Constantine and Helen Chapel	Sts. Constantine and Helen Chapel	June 6, 1980 (#80004583)	In Lime Village; 61°21′19″N 155°26′06″W	Lime Village	

== See also ==
- List of National Historic Landmarks in Alaska
- National Register of Historic Places listings in Alaska
