= Akiachak Airport =

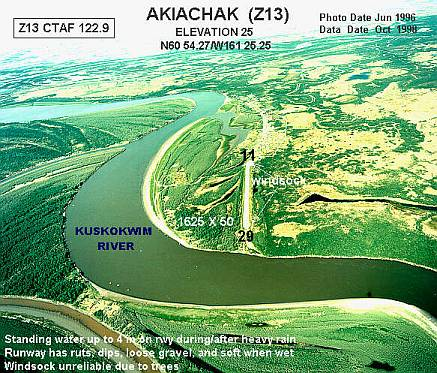
- IATA: KKI; ICAO: PFZK; FAA LID: Z13

Summary
- Airport type: Public
- Owner: State of Alaska DOT&PF
- Serves: Akiachak, Alaska
- Elevation AMSL: 25 ft (7.6 m)
- Coordinates: 60°54′22″N 161°25′37″W

Map
- Location of airport in Alaska

Runways
Direction	Length		Surface
Direction	ft	m	Surface
1/19	3,300	1,006	Gravel

Statistics (2015)
- Aircraft operations: 3,000 (2014)
- Based aircraft: 0
- Passengers: 5,094
- Freight: 192,000 lbs
- Source: FAA

Akiachak Airport (IATA: KKI, ICAO: PFZK, FAA LID: Z13) is a state-owned public-use airport located in Akiachak, in the Bethel Census Area of the U.S. state of Alaska.

As per Federal Aviation Administration records, this airport had 2,607 passenger boardings (enplanements) in calendar year 2007, an increase of 44% from the 1,811 enplanements in 2006.

== Facilities ==
Akiachak Airport has one runway designated 1/19 with a 3,300 by 60 ft (1,004 x 18 m) gravel surface. For the 12-month period ending August 26, 2005, the airport had 3,000 aircraft operations, an average of 250 per month, all of which were air taxi.

The state has plans to acquire 236 acres (0.96 km^{2}) to relocate the airport and build a new 3,300-foot (1,000 m) runway.

== Airlines and destinations ==
Airlines	Destinations
Yute Commuter Service	Akiak, Bethel, Kwethluk, Tuluksak

=== Statistics ===
Carrier shares: January – December 2015
Carrier	Passengers (arriving and departing)
Yute Air	3,160(69.99%)
Hageland	1,790(35.20%)
Grant	140(2.81%)

Top domestic destinations: Jan. – Dec. 2015
Rank	City	Airport name & IATA code	Passengers
1	Bethel, AK	Bethel (BET)	2,560
2	Akiak, AK	Akiak (AKI)	60
3	Tuluksak, AK	Tuluksak (TLT)	40
4	Aniak, AK	Aniak (ANI)	20
5	Kwethluk, AK	Kwethluk (KWT)	10

== See also ==
- List of airports in Alaska
