= Z13 =

Z13 may refer to:

- Akiachak Airport FAA LID
- Z13 torpedo, an electric heavy torpedo of the French Navy
- Small nucleolar RNA Z13/snr52, a non-coding RNA molecule
- German destroyer Z13 Erich Koellner, a Type 1934A destroyer built for the German Navy in the late 1930s
- New South Wales Z13 class locomotive, a class of steam locomotive built for and operated by the New South Wales Government Railways of Australia
- HMCS Renard (Z13)
- IBM z13 (microprocessor), a microprocessor chip used in mainframe computers.
