= List of places in Alaska (L) =

This list of cities, towns, unincorporated communities, counties, and other recognized places in the U.S. state of Alaska also includes information on the number and names of counties in which the place lies, and its lower and upper zip code bounds, if applicable.

Name of place	Number of counties	Principal county	Lower zip code	Upper zip code
Labouchere Bay	1	Prince of Wales-Outer Census Area		
Lagoon	1	Denali Borough		
Lake and Peninsula	1	Lake and Peninsula Borough	99576	
Lake And Peninsula Borough School District	1	Lake and Peninsula Borough		
Lake Clark National Park	3	Dillingham Census Area	99501	
Lake Clark National Park	3	Kenai Peninsula Borough	99501	
Lake Clark National Park	3	Matanuska-Susitna Borough	99501	
Lake Louise	1	Matanuska-Susitna Borough		
Lake Minchumina	1	Yukon-Koyukuk Census Area	99757	
Lake Minchumina	1	Yukon-Koyukuk Census Area		
Lakes	1	Matanuska-Susitna Borough		
Lakeview	1	Kenai Peninsula Borough		
Lamont	1	Kusilvak Census Area		
Lane	1	Matanuska-Susitna Borough		
Larsen Bay	1	Kodiak Island Borough	99624	
Latouche	1	Valdez-Cordova Census Area		
Lawing	1	Kenai Peninsula Borough	99664	
Lazy Mountain	1	Matanuska-Susitna Borough		
Lee's Camp	1	Nome Census Area		
Lemeta	1	Fairbanks North Star Borough	99701	
Lemon Creek	1	City and Borough of Juneau	99801	
Lena Cove	1	City and Borough of Juneau	99801	
Levelock	1	Lake and Peninsula Borough	99625	
Libbyville	1	Bristol Bay Borough		
Lignite	1	Denali Borough		
Lime Village	1	Bethel Census Area	99673	
Little Diomede	1	Nome Census Area	99762	
Livengood	1	Yukon-Koyukuk Census Area	99701	
Long	1	Yukon-Koyukuk Census Area	99768	
Long Island	1	Matanuska-Susitna Borough	99687	
Long Island	1	Prince of Wales-Outer Census Area		
Loring	1	Ketchikan Gateway Borough		
Lost River	1	Nome Census Area		
Lowell Point	1	Kenai Peninsula Borough		
Lower Kalskag	1	Bethel Census Area	99626	
Lower Kuskokwim	1	Bethel Census Area		
Lower Kuskokwim Regional Educational Attendance Area	2	Bethel Census Area		
Lower Kuskokwim Regional Educational Attendance Area	2	Kusilvak Census Area		
Lower Mendenhall Valley	1	City and Borough of Juneau	99801	
Lower Tonsina	1	Valdez-Cordova Census Area	99573	
Lower Yukon Regional Educational Attendance Area	2	Bethel Census Area		
Lower Yukon Regional Educational Attendance Area	2	Kusilvak Census Area		
Lutak	1	Haines Borough		
