= List of places in Alaska (O) =

This list of cities, towns, unincorporated communities, counties, and other recognized places in the U.S. state of Alaska also includes information on the number and names of counties in which the place lies, and its lower and upper zip code bounds, if applicable.

Name of place	Number of counties	Principal county	Lower zip code	Upper zip code
Ohogamiut	1	Kusilvak Census Area		
Old Anderafski	1	Kusilvak Census Area	99658	
Old Chatanika	1	Fairbanks North Star Borough		
Old Harbor	1	Kodiak Island Borough	99643	
Old Kvichak	1	Dillingham Census Area		
Old Minto	1	Yukon-Koyukuk Census Area		
Old Ninilchik	1	Kenai Peninsula Borough		
Old Rampart	1	Yukon-Koyukuk Census Area		
Old Tyonek	1	Kenai Peninsula Borough	99682	
Old Valdez	1	Valdez-Cordova Census Area		
Olive Cove	1	Wrangell-Petersburg Census Area		
Olnes	1	Fairbanks North Star Borough	99701	
Ophir	1	Yukon-Koyukuk Census Area		
Orca	1	Valdez-Cordova Census Area	99574	
Oscarville	1	Bethel Census Area	99559	
Oskawalik	1	Bethel Census Area		
Outer Ketchikan	1	Prince of Wales-Outer Census Area		
Ouzinkie	1	Kodiak Island Borough	99644	
