= Yupiit School District =

School district in Alaska, United States

Location
- Akiachak, Alaska and surrounding communities United States

District information
- Grades: PK-12
- Established: 1984 (42 years ago)
- NCES District ID: 0200004

Students and staff
- Students: 522
- Teachers: 39.3
- Staff: 61.72
- Student–teacher ratio: 13.28

Other information
- Schedule: August to May
- Website: www.yupiit.org

The Yupiit School District serves students in the Akiachak, Akiak, and Tuluksak communities in the Bethel Census Area of the U.S. state of Alaska.

== Local Control ==
The district was established in 1984 for the purpose of bringing local control to the schools. Initial goals of the district included: knowledge of Yup'ik culture, skills, and values, preparation for advanced education and work, and the ability to communicate in the native language and in English. Later, the district implemented a curriculum based on the Yup'ik culture.

The school is governed by an elected board with seven members serving three year terms.

== Yup'ik culture ==
The school district offers dual-immersion classes in the Yup'ik culture at the elementary level and Yup'ik studies and Yup'ik language classes at the secondary level.

Students learn skills such as traditional fishing, caribou hunting, and dog-mushing. Students at the Tuluksak school dog-mush in competition.

== Schools ==
- Akiachak School, grades K-12, 209 students. This campus also houses a public library.
- Akiak School, grades PK-12, 101 students. This campus also houses a public library.
- Tuluksak School, grades PK-12, 150 students. This campus also houses a public library.

== Demographics ==
Of the 234 students enrolled in grades 3 through 10 during the week of standardized testing in 2007, 227 were "Alaskan Native or American Indian," 3 were Caucasian, and 4 were Multi-Ethnic.

== No Child Left Behind ==
Based on test scores of the 2006-2007 school year

Of the 245 students tested in grades 3 through 10, 30.0% were proficient or better in reading, 23.6% in writing, and 26.7% in mathematics. The graduation rate was 43%. The Yupiit School District failed to make adequate yearly progress for the 4th consecutive year under No Child Left Behind.

Based on test scores of the 2007-2008 school year

Of the 231 students in grades 3 through 10, 18% were proficient in language-arts and 22% were proficient in mathematics. The district failed to make adequate yearly progress.

== School funding lawsuit ==
In 2004, the Yupiit School District, the NEA-Alaska labor union, and several other school districts sued the state (Moore v. Alaska), asking for additional funding and educational programs. In 2007, the court ruled for the state. In his ruling, the judge cited the Yupiit School District when it said "the state must be more aggressive in overseeing troubled school districts" and ruled that the state exams were unfair.

== Sexual assault lawsuits ==
In 2011, Michael Bowman, a teacher from Montana, was accused of sexually assaulting multiple underage school girls. A $2 million civil lawsuit was settled between the Yupiit School District and nine Alaska native female students and two adults who were allegedly assaulted by Bowman.

In 2015, a female teacher filed a lawsuit against the Yupiit School District alleging "She was subjected to discrimination and harassment during her employment leading to a sexual assault".

== See also ==
- List of school districts in Alaska
