= St. Jacob's Church =

St. Jacob's Church may refer to:

in Belgium

- St. Jacob's Church, Bruges, also called Sint-Jakobskerk

in Norway

- St. Jacob's Church, Bergen, burial place of Johan Christian Dahl

in Slovakia

- Saint Jacob's Chapel, Bratislava, more commonly Saint James' Chapel

in Sweden

- Saint Jacob's Church, Stockholm, more commonly Saint James' Chapel

in the United States

- St. Jacob's Church (Napaskiak, Alaska), Russian Orthodox, listed on the National Register of Historic Places
