= St. Seraphim Chapel =

Historic church in Alaska, United States

- U.S. National Register of Historic Places
- Alaska Heritage Resources Survey
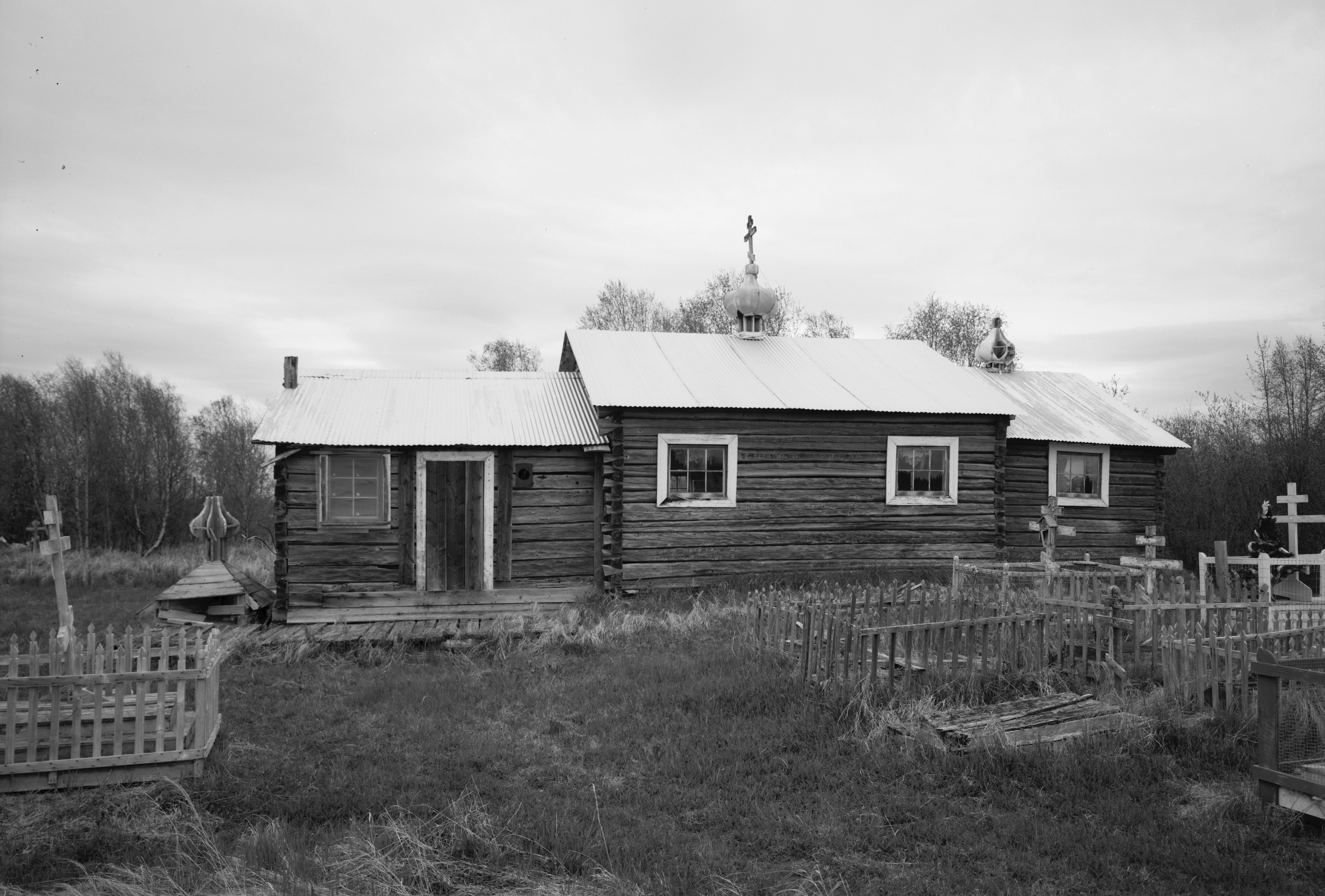

- Location within Alaska
- Location: In Lower Kalskag, Lower Kalskag, Alaska
- Coordinates: 61°30′50″N 160°21′59″W
- Area: less than one acre
- Built: 1843
- MPS: Russian Orthodox Church Buildings and Sites TR
- NRHP reference No.: 80004586
- AHRS No.: RUS-017

Significant dates
- Added to NRHP: June 6, 1980
- Designated AHRS: May 18, 1973

The St. Seraphim Chapel, also known as the Old Church, is a historic Russian Orthodox church in Lower Kalskag, Alaska, United States, in Bethel Census Area, that may include a portion built in 1843, or it may have all been built later. It was listed on the National Register of Historic Places in 1980.

The community has a 1975-built new church used for Russian Orthodox services; this is an old church that is either a later enlargement of an original church built probably in 1843 or it is wholly a later 1800s replacement. The old church reflects the influence of traditional three-part Russian Orthodox ecclesiastical architecture in America expressed in the style of a log cabin. Balanced in the center, it is divided into three parts: vestibule, nave, and altar chamber. Each section is built by squared logs with corner dovetailing and straight butt joints at points where the logs are shorter. A 1979 survey suggested that no other extant log church in Alaska (and perhaps nowhere else in all of North America) of its age possessed comparable construction.

== See also ==
- National Register of Historic Places listings in Bethel Census Area, Alaska
