= Mission House =

Mission House may refer to:

== United States ==
- First Mission House, Bethel, Alaska
- Old Mission House, Fort Yukon, Alaska
- Mission House (Stockbridge, Massachusetts)
- Mission House (Mackinac Island), Michigan

== Other countries ==
- Bodden Town Mission House, Grand Cayman
- Hermannsburg Mission House, Hermannsburg, KwaZulu-Natal, South Africa
- Kemp House, also known as Mission House, Kerikeri, New Zealand
- Moravian Brethren Mission House, Nuuk, Greenland

== See also ==
- Mission Houses Museum, Honolulu, Hawaii
- Church Missions House, New York City
- Mission station
- Mission house
