= Sts. Constantine and Helen Chapel =

Historic church in Alaska, United States

- U.S. National Register of Historic Places
- Alaska Heritage Resources Survey
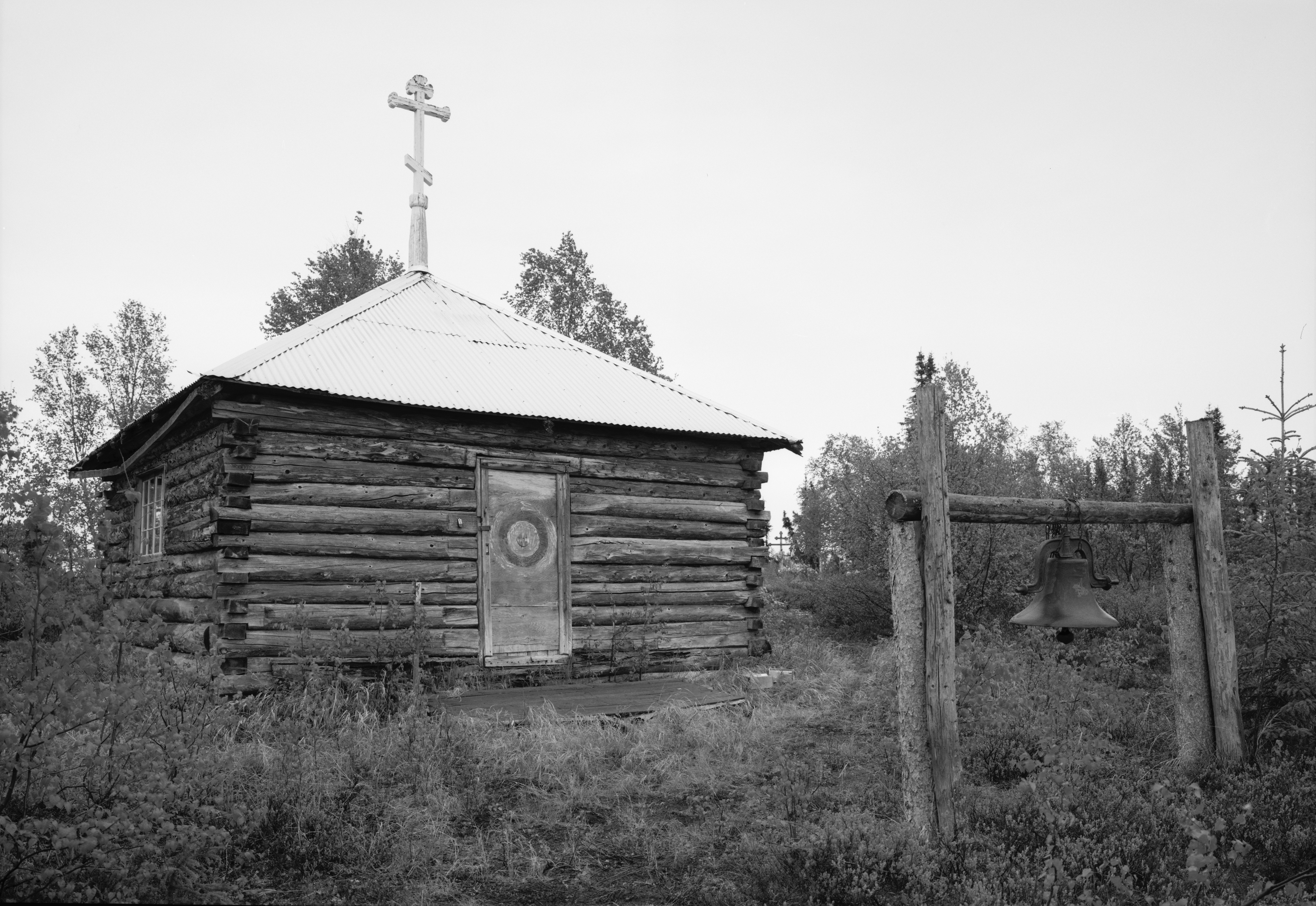

- Location within Alaska
- Location: In Lime Village, Lime Village, Alaska
- Coordinates: 61°21′19″N 155°26′6″W
- Area: less than one acre
- Built: 1923
- MPS: Russian Orthodox Church Buildings and Sites TR
- NRHP reference No.: 80004583
- AHRS No.: LIM-001

Significant dates
- Added to NRHP: June 6, 1980
- Designated AHRS: May 18, 1973

The Sts. Constantine and Helen Chapel in Lime Village, Alaska, United States, in the Bethel Census Area, is a historic Russian Orthodox church that was built in 1923. It is now under the Diocese of Alaska of the Orthodox Church in America.

It is simple and square, 17.75 feet (5.41 m) in each dimension, built of logs, and is argued to be "the evocation of a rural R.O. church structure in Alaska, an outstanding example of durable utile architectural simplicity". It was listed on the National Register of Historic Places in 1980.

== See also ==
- National Register of Historic Places listings in Bethel Census Area, Alaska
