= St. Jacob's Church (Napaskiak, Alaska) =

Historic church in Alaska, United States

- U.S. National Register of Historic Places
- Alaska Heritage Resources Survey
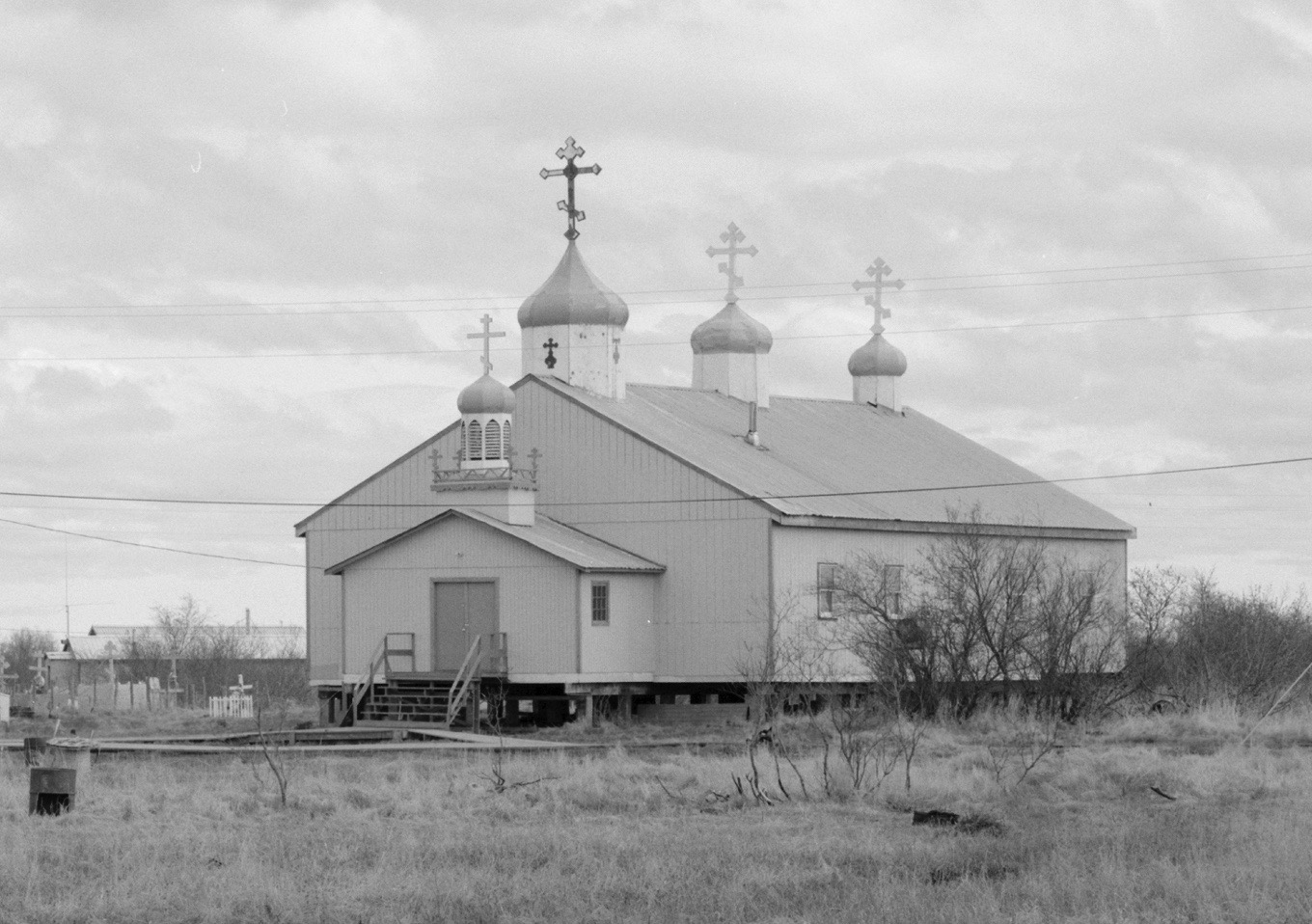

- Location within Alaska
- Location: In Napaskiak, Napaskiak, Alaska
- Coordinates: 60°42′23.8″N 161°45′59.7″W
- Area: less than one acre
- MPS: Russian Orthodox Church Buildings and Sites TR
- NRHP reference No.: 80000748
- AHRS No.: BTH-009

Significant dates
- Added to NRHP: June 6, 1980
- Designated AHRS: May 18, 1973

St. Jacob's Church is a historic Russian Orthodox church in Napaskiak, Alaska, United States. It is now under the Diocese of Alaska of the Orthodox Church in America. It was listed on the National Register of Historic Places in 1980.

It has a 62 by 23 feet (18.9 m × 7.0 m) plan, extended out from an original 32 feet (9.8 m) building length, from when it was built sometime in the early 1900s. The western 26 feet (7.9 m) part of the building was added in two stages over the course of the 20th century, and was done to closely match the properties of the existing structure. The second addition added a vestibule area and a small bell tower topped by an Orthodox onion dome. The building is clad in novelty siding.

== See also ==
- National Register of Historic Places listings in Bethel Census Area, Alaska
