= Tuluksak Airport =

Airport in Alaska, United States

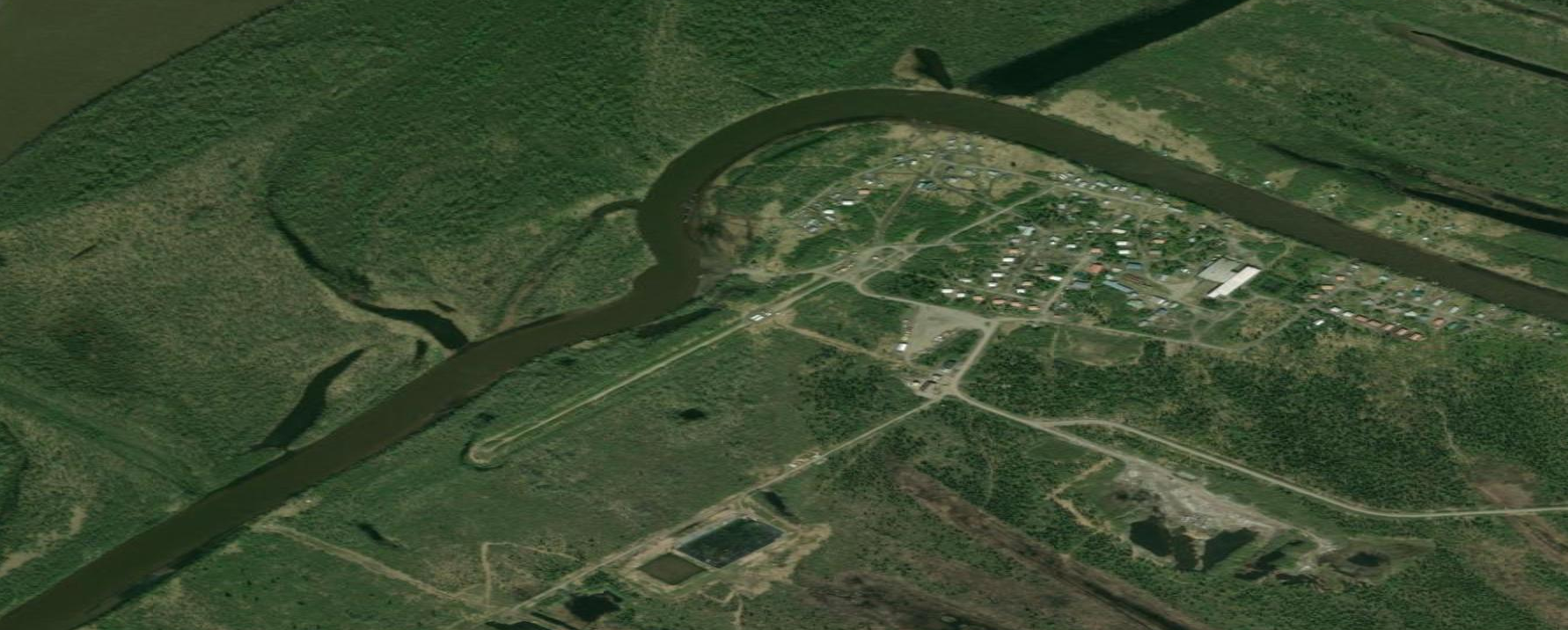
- IATA: TLT; ICAO: PALT; FAA LID: TLT

Summary
- Airport type: Public
- Owner: Alaska DOT&PF - Central Region
- Serves: Tuluksak, Alaska
- Elevation AMSL: 30 ft (9.1 m)
- Coordinates: 61°05′49″N 160°58′10″W

Map
- Location of airport in Alaska

Runways
Direction	Length		Surface
Direction	ft	m	Surface
02/20	2,461	750	Gravel/dirt
- Source: Federal Aviation Administration

Tuluksak Airport (IATA: TLT, ICAO: PALT, FAA LID: TLT) is a state-owned public-use airport serving Tuluksak, in the Bethel Census Area of the U.S. state of Alaska.

== Facilities ==
Tuluksak Airport has one runway designated 02/20 with a gravel and dirt surface measuring 2,461 by 30 feet (750 x 9 m).

== See also ==
- List of airports in Alaska
