= Mertarvik, Alaska =

Mertarvik (Mug-TUG-vik; Central Yupik: Mertarvik [məg'təgvɪk]) is a village in the Bethel Census Area, Alaska. In 2019, the first residents from the town of Newtok, which is eroding, began to arrive. By 2024, all Newtok residents had moved to Mertarvik.

As of the 2020 Census, 99 people lived there. In 2020, the State of Alaska had not sent voting primary forms to the village because of how new it was.

In 2025, much of the infrastructure already started failing, due to lack of federal involvement and dismissal of Mertarvik's specific needs.

== Education ==
The Lower Kuskokwim School District operates the Mertarvik Pioneer School, which is a continuation of Newtok's Ayaprun School. As of 2020, it uses temporary facilities in the Mertarvik Education Center (MEC) before a permanent school is to be constructed. The school has teachers using English and Yugtun as mediums of instruction. The Mertarvik school's initial enrollment was 10 and it began operations on October 14, 2019. It initially had four teachers, with half using each language as a medium.

As of the 2023-2024 school year, the Mertarvik's school had 40+ students.

As of April 2025, construction on the permanent school campus is still underway at 30% completion.
