= Newtok, Alaska =

Newtok Niugtaq
- CDP
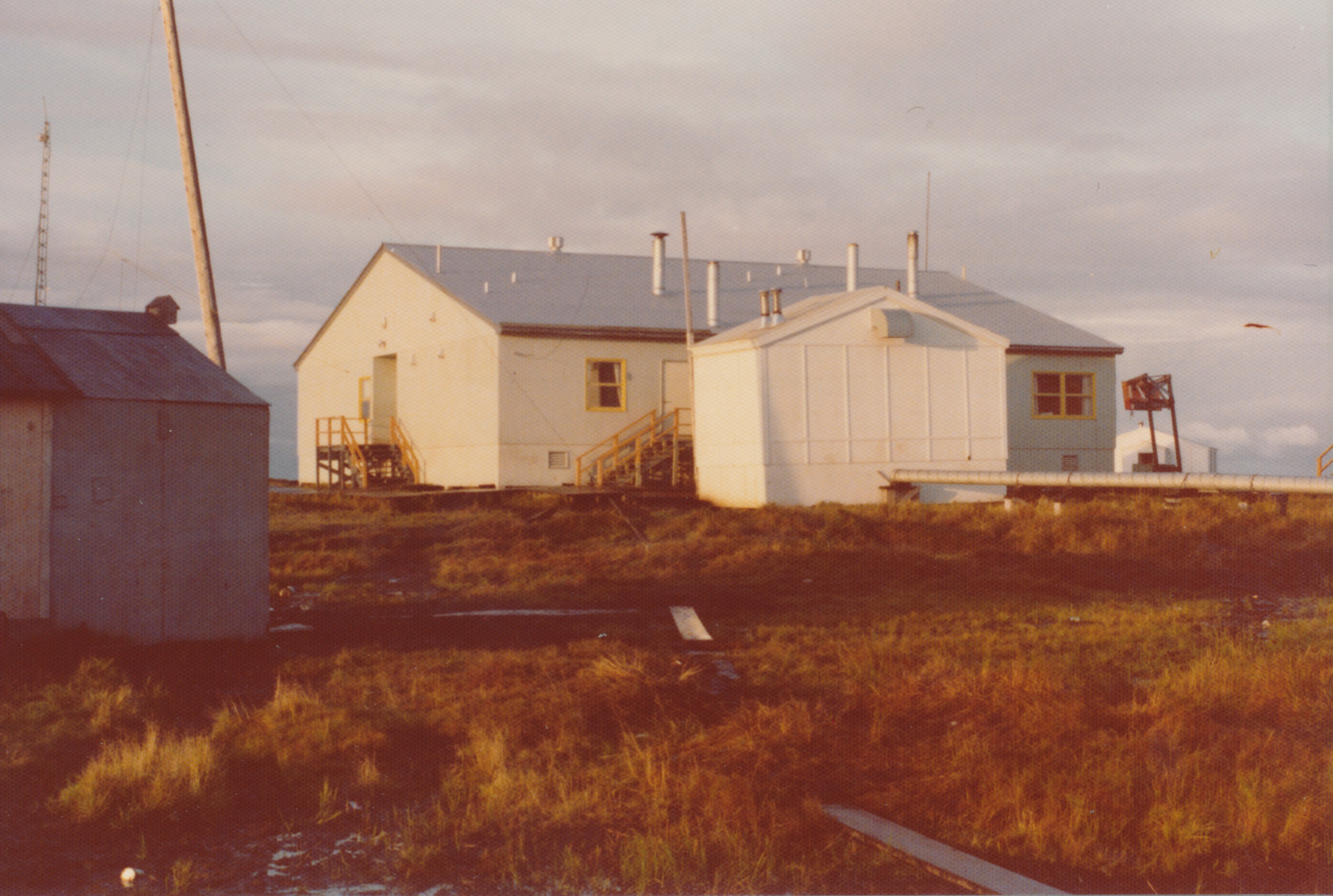
- Newtok school in 1974

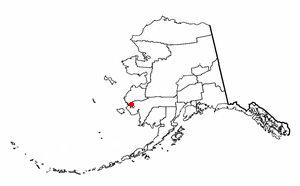
- Location of Newtok, Alaska
- Coordinates: 60°56′40″N 164°38′39″W
- Country: United States
- State: Alaska
- Census Area: Bethel

Government
  - State senator: Lyman Hoffman (D)
  - State rep.: Conrad McCormick (D)

Area
  - Total: 1.44 sq mi (3.74 km^{2})
  - Land: 1.33 sq mi (3.45 km^{2})
  - Water: 0.11 sq mi (0.29 km^{2})

Population (2020)
  - Total: 209
  - Density: 156.7/sq mi (60.51/km^{2})
- Time zone: UTC-9 (Alaska (AKST))
  - Summer (DST): UTC-8 (AKDT)
- ZIP code: 99559
- Area code: 907
- FIPS code: 02-53820

Newtok (Central Yupik: Niugtaq) is a small village on the Ningliq River in the Bethel Census Area, Alaska, United States. The population is 0 as of late 2024, down from 321 in 2000, and the village has been abandoned. Climate change and river erosion forced the primarily Central Yup'ik Alaska Native village to consider relocation. Residents moved to the new village of Mertarvik.

== Geography ==
According to the United States Census Bureau, the CDP has a total area of 1.1 square miles (2.8 km^{2}), of which, 1 square mile (2.6 km^{2}) of it is land and 0.1 square miles (0.26 km^{2}) of it (7.21%) is water.

== Demographics ==
Historical population
Census	Pop.	Note	%±
1950	69		—
1960	129		87.0%
1970	114		−11.6%
1980	131		14.9%
1990	207		58.0%
2000	321		55.1%
2010	354		10.3%
2020	209		−41.0%
U.S. Decennial Census

Newtok first appeared on the 1950 U.S. Census as "Keyaluvik", an unincorporated native village. This was also the name of the earlier settlement just to the west, which became known as "Old Keyaluvik." In 1960, the name was changed to Newtok. Newtok formally incorporated in 1976, but disincorporated in 1997. It was then made a census-designated place (CDP), effective with the 2000 census.

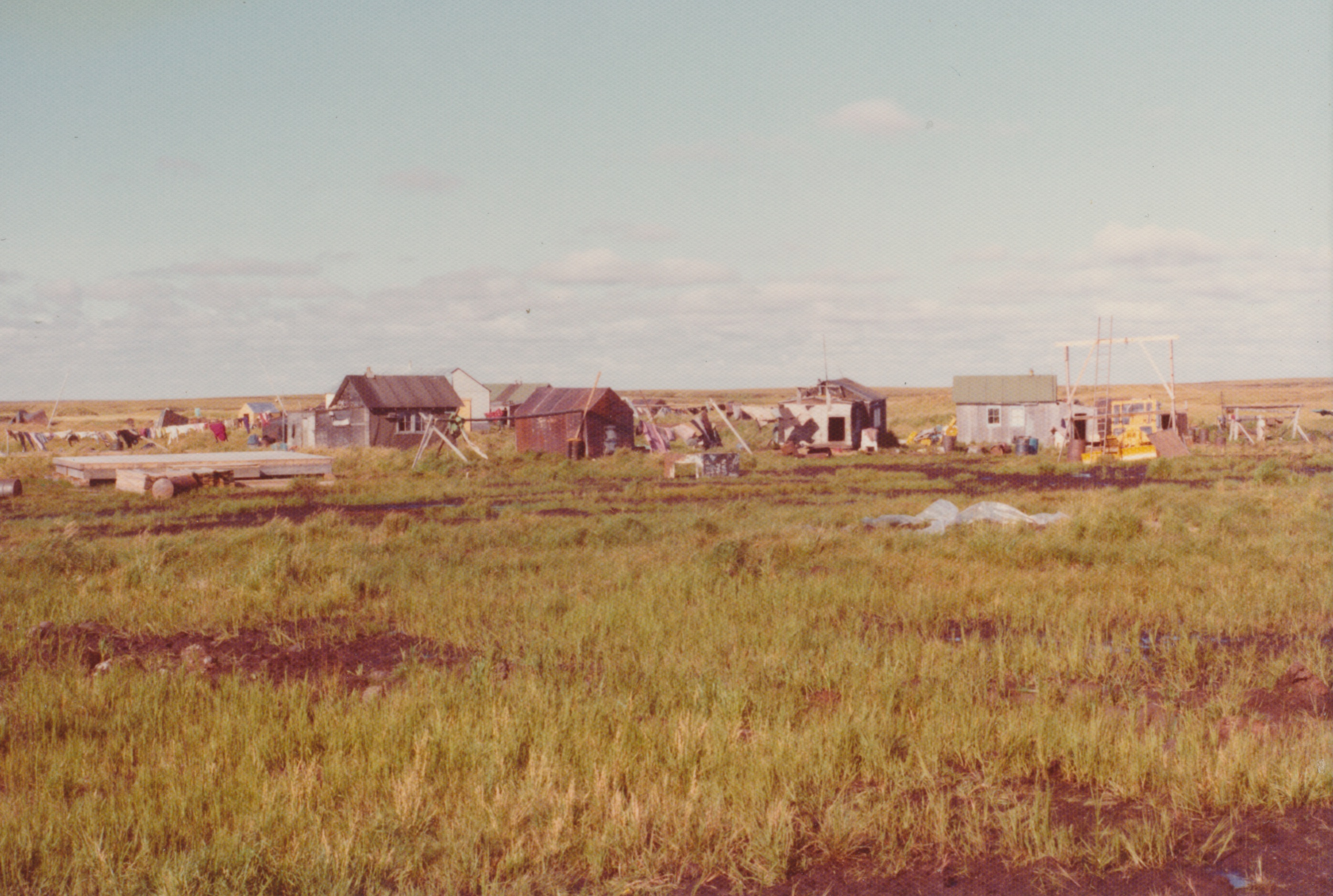
Houses in the south of Newtok, 1974

As of the census of 2000, there were 321 people, 63 households, and 51 families residing in the CDP. The population density was 313.1 inhabitants per square mile (120.9/km^{2}). There were 67 housing units at an average density of 65.4 per square mile (25.3/km^{2}). The racial makeup of the CDP was 3.12% White, 95.33% Native American, and 1.56% from two or more races.

There were 63 households, out of which 68.3% had children under the age of 18 living with them, 63.5% were married couples living together, 11.1% had a female householder with no husband present, and 19.0% were non-families. 19.0% of all households were made up of individuals, and none had someone living alone who was 65 years of age or older. The average household size was 5.10 and the average family size was 5.96.

In the CDP, the population was spread out, with 45.2% under the age of 18, 10.0% from 18 to 24, 26.8% from 25 to 44, 14.3% from 45 to 64, and 3.7% who were 65 years of age or older. The median age was 21 years. For every 100 females, there were 118.4 males. For every 100 females age 18 and over, there were 112.0 males.

The median income for a household in the CDP was $32,188, and the median income for a family was $32,188. Males had a median income of $26,250 versus $15,625 for females. The per capita income for the CDP was $9,514. About 29.8% of families and 31.0% of the population were below the poverty line, including 38.9% of those under age 18 and none of those age 65 or over.

== Environmental issues ==
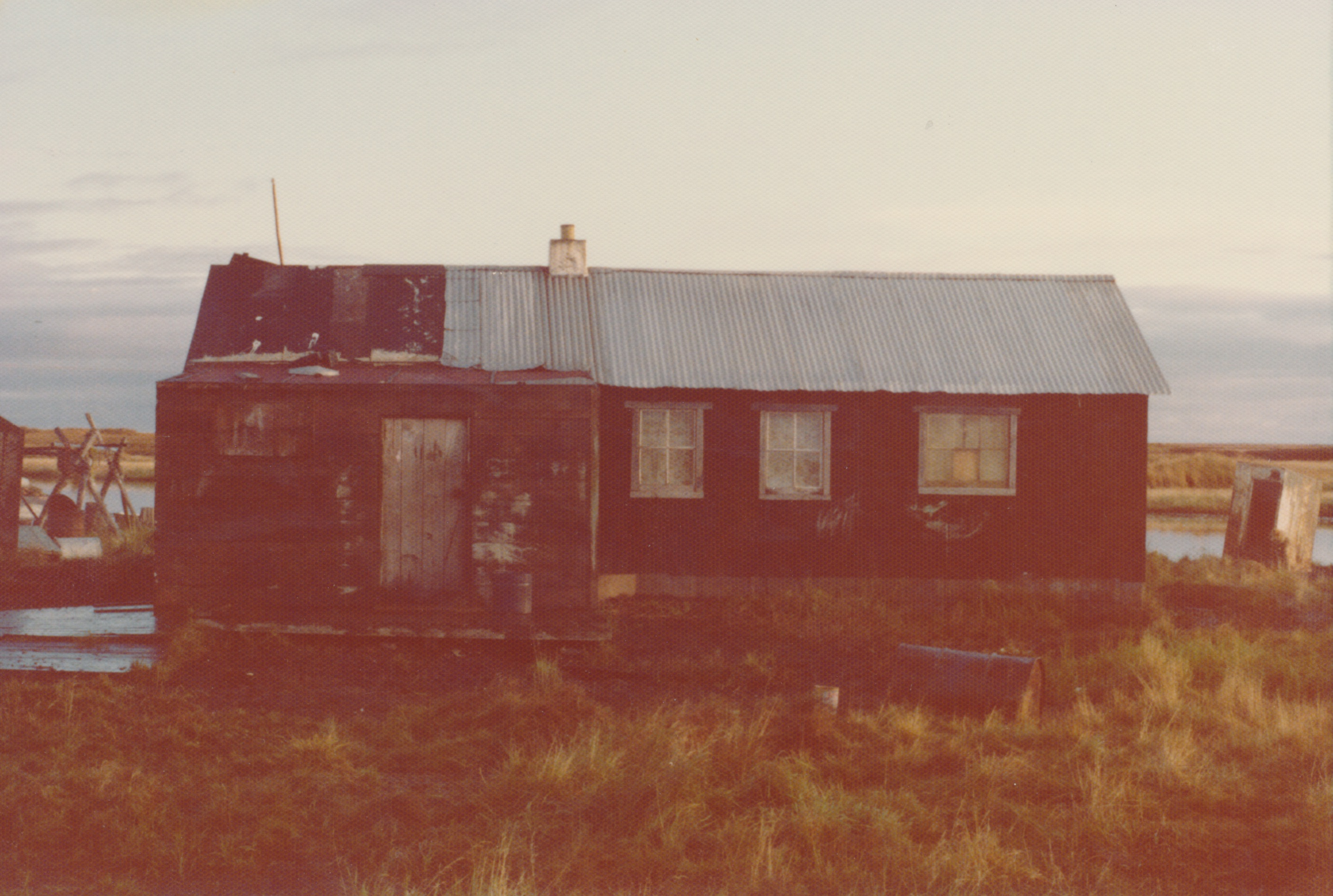
Building that functioned as the Head Start school and church, 1974

In 2007, The New York Times reported that erosion made Newtok an island between the widening Ningliq River and a slough to the north, because Alaskan permafrost is melting due to climate change. Coastal storms and thawing permafrost have worn away the land upon which Newtok was built. According to The New York Times article, because the village is below sea-level and sinking, the town could be washed away within a decade.

Erosion of the tundra by the river has destroyed much of the area of the village, including the barge dock. The United States Army Corps of Engineers' March 2009 report estimates the highest point in the town, the high school, will be under water by the year 2017.

The town was featured in the 2009 History Channel's TV show, Tougher in Alaska, in the episode called "Dangerous Earth."

In 2015, Newtok was one of the two towns featured in the Al Jazeera English Fault Lines documentary, When the Water Took the Land.

By 2019, the first residents moved to a new town, Mertarvik.

In 2022, Patagonia released a feature-length documentary on Newtok.

In 2025, Pro Publica published an article entitled, "Newtok, Alaska, Was Supposed to Be a Model for Climate Relocation. Here’s How It Went Wrong." The U.S. and the State of Alaska are ill-prepared to adapt and respond to climate change is making some places uninhabitable.

== Education ==
Lower Kuskokwim School District operated the Ayaprun School (not to be confused with Ayaprun-Elitnaurvik, a school in Bethel, AK, that is run by the same school district). As of 2018, the school had 128 students, 12 teachers, and 27 other employees. With Newtok residents relocating to Mertarvik, during the 2023-2024 school year, there were about 30 students and 4 teachers left at Ayaprun. Ayaprun officially closed for good at the end of the school year in 2024. Its continuation is the Mertarvik Pioneer School, which is still under construction and set to be completed in 2026.

== Relocation ==
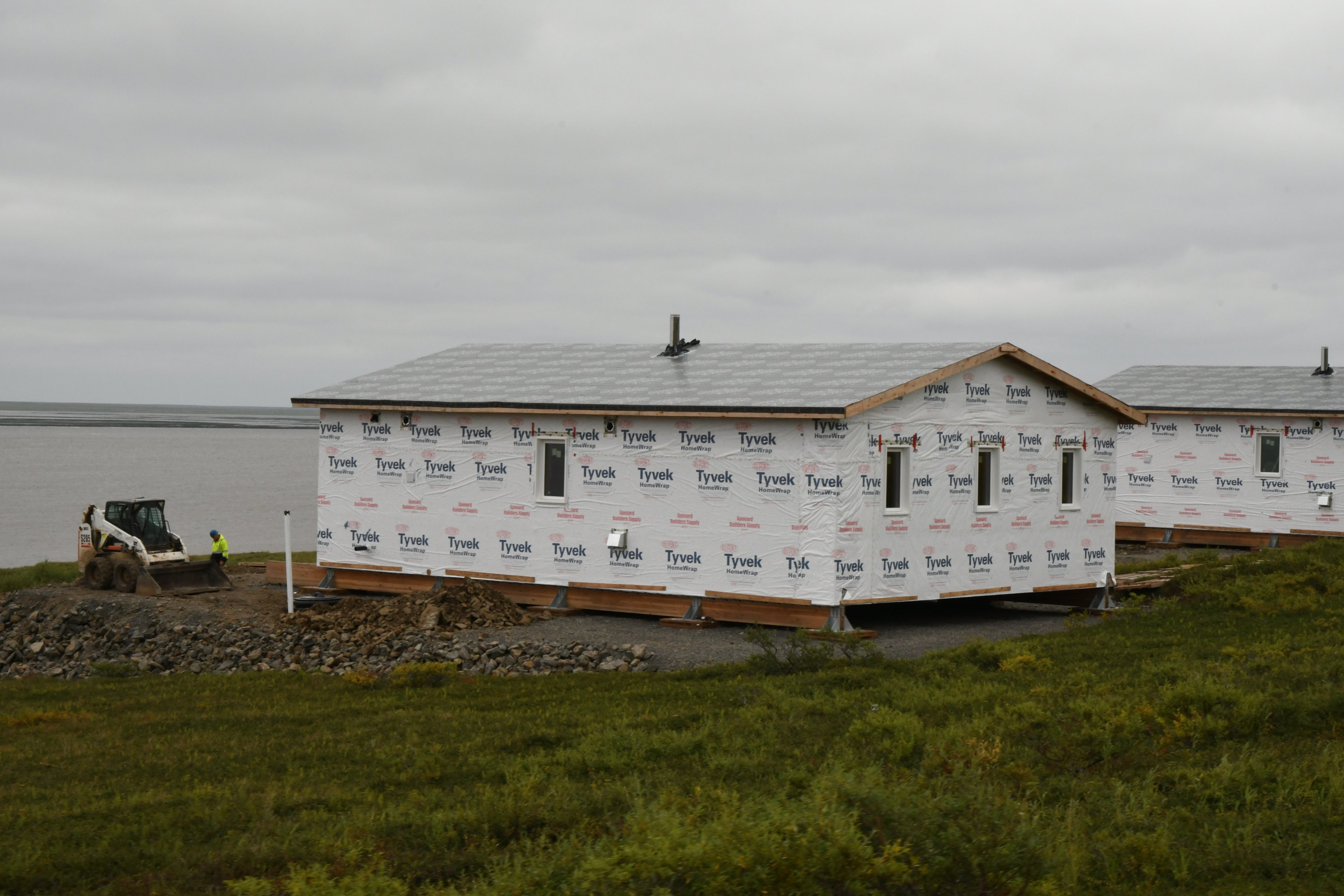
New homes being constructed as part of the Mertarvik village project.

Land was acquired for a new townsite called Mertarvik on nearby Nelson Island about 9 miles (14 km) away, and $1 million in government funding was obtained to build a dock for delivering building supplies.

As of 2016, although the town's roughly 400 residents voted in 2003 to relocate to higher ground nine miles away, progress has been slow.

On December 24, 2016, the village made a disaster declaration request to the Federal Emergency Management Agency for disaster assistance due to "flooding, persistent erosion, and permafrost degradation starting on January 1, 2006 and continuing." The request would "include relocation of the Yupik Tribe (population of ~350 people)."

During the summer of 2018, a 6,000 square-foot community center was built, as were 8 houses. Plans for 2019 include interior work in the community center so it can be used as a school, a generator building, and 13 more houses. Construction of roads, pipes, and a water treatment plant is planned. The goal is to complete relocation by 2023.

In September 2022, Typhoon Merbok caused damage to fuel barrels and moved the ocean shoreline closer to the edge of the town.. Although Newtok's relocation was intended to serve as a model for dozens of other Alaskan communities facing future displacement, a joint investigation by The Washington Post, ProPublica, and Bethel radio station KYUK found that participants in the effort viewed the project as indicative of federal oversight failures, a lack of understanding of local cultural needs, and broader U.S. unpreparedness for climate-induced displacement.

== See also ==
- Effects of global warming
- Sea level rise
