= St. Sergius Chapel =

Historic church in Alaska, United States

- U.S. National Register of Historic Places
- Alaska Heritage Resources Survey
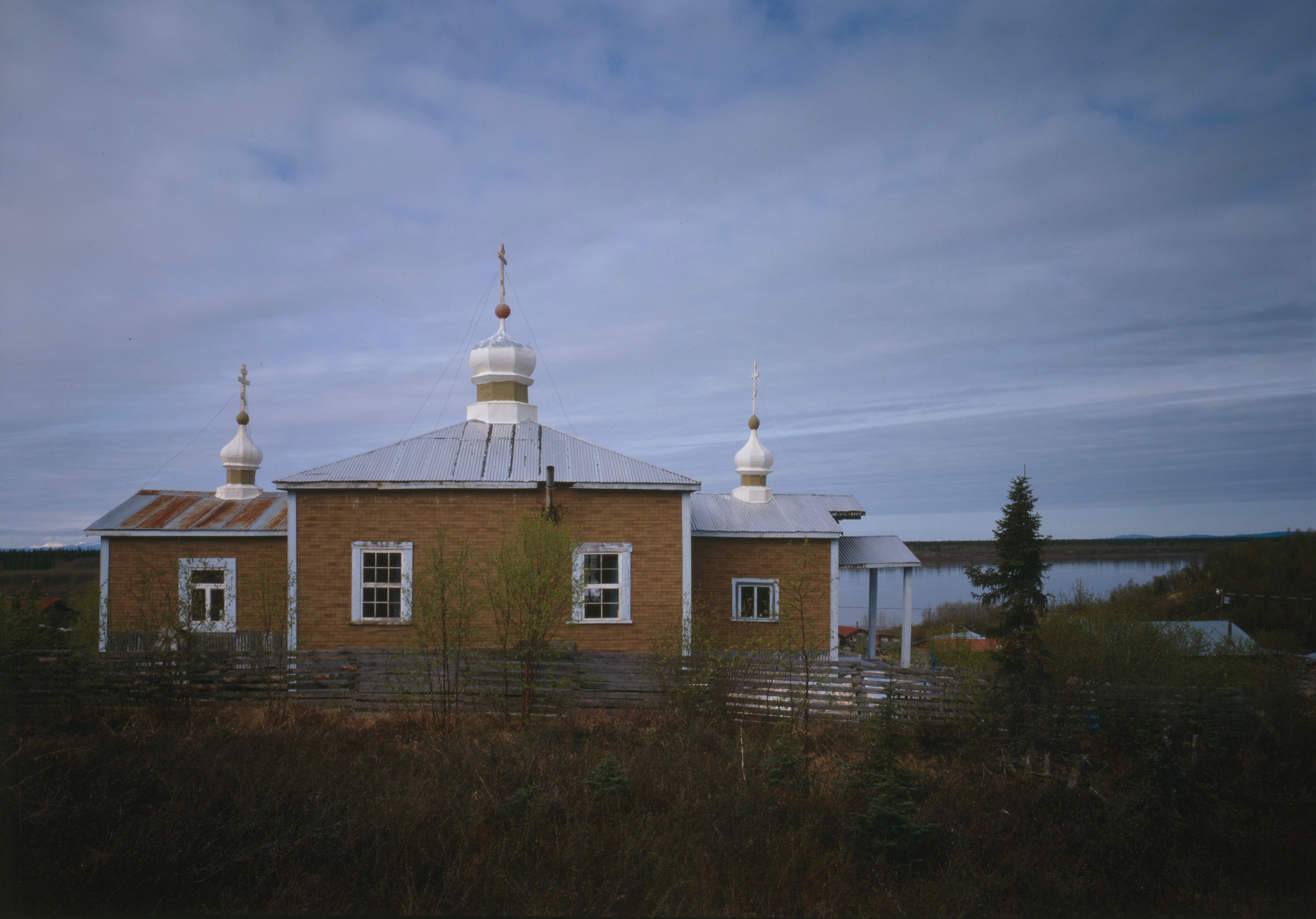
- 1990 HABS photo

- Location within Alaska
- Location: In Chuathbaluk, Chuathbaluk, Alaska
- Coordinates: 61°34′18″N 159°14′38″W
- Area: less than one acre
- Built: 1891
- MPS: Russian Orthodox Church Buildings and Sites TR
- NRHP reference No.: 80004585
- AHRS No.: RUS-015

Significant dates
- Added to NRHP: June 6, 1980
- Designated AHRS: May 18, 1973

The St. Sergius Chapel is a historic Russian Orthodox church in Chuathbaluk, Alaska, United States, in the Bethel Census Area. It is now under the Diocese of Alaska of the Orthodox Church in America.

Traditionally, the church is believed to have been built in 1891 by Father Ivan Orlov. The wood-frame structure has three major elements. At the western end is a gable-roof vestibule section with a small onion dome on top, and a similarly sized matching section at the eastern end. The central section is a larger, roughly square structure, topped by a hip roof with a larger onion dome. It was listed on the National Register of Historic Places in 1980.

== See also ==
- National Register of Historic Places listings in Bethel Census Area, Alaska
