= St. Nicholas Russian Orthodox Church (Kwethluk, Alaska) =

Historic church in Alaska, United States

- U.S. National Register of Historic Places
- Alaska Heritage Resources Survey
- Location within Alaska
- Location: Lower Kuskokwim River, Kwethluk, Alaska
- Coordinates: 60°48′43″N 161°26′15″W
- Area: less than one acre
- Built: 1935
- MPS: Russian Orthodox Church Buildings and Sites TR
- NRHP reference No.: 91000385
- AHRS No.: BTH-001
- Added to NRHP: April 15, 1991

The St. Nicholas Russian Orthodox Church is a historic Russian Orthodox church near Kwethluk, Alaska, United States, on the Lower Kuskokwim River. It is part of the Diocese of Alaska of the Orthodox Church in America.

It is a wood-frame structure, resting on a log foundation, and is completely built out of cedar. It is rectangular in plan, with a gable roof which sported two small onion domes with crosses, but these were blown off by high winds and stored. The western side of the building has the vestibule area, above which rises a modest square belltower. It was built in 1935 as a replacement for an earlier church that was built around 1900, and is the oldest structure standing in the Kwethluk area. It was listed on the U.S. National Register of Historic Places in 1991.

== See also ==
- National Register of Historic Places listings in Bethel Census Area, Alaska
