= Small nucleolar RNA Z13/snr52 =

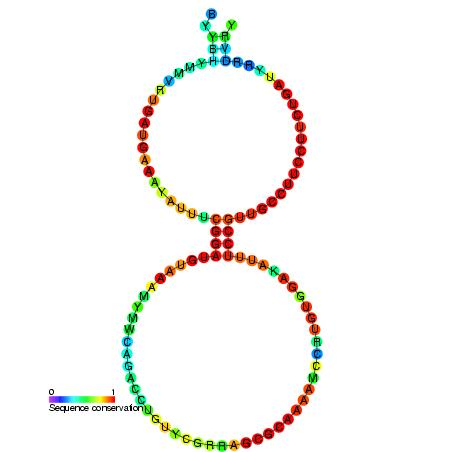
- Predicted secondary structure and sequence conservation of snoZ13_snr52

Identifiers
- Symbol: snoZ13_snr52
- Rfam: RF00335

Other data
- RNA type: Gene; snRNA; snoRNA; CD-box
- Domain: Eukaryota
- GO: GO:0006396 GO:0005730
- SO: SO:0000593
- PDB structures: PDBe

In molecular biology, Small nucleolar RNA snR52 (homologous to Z13) is a non-coding RNA (ncRNA) molecule which functions in the modification of other small nuclear RNAs (snRNAs). This type of modifying RNA is usually located in the nucleolus of the eukaryotic cell which is a major site of snRNA biogenesis. It is known as a small nucleolar RNA (snoRNA) and also often referred to as a guide RNA. snoRNA Z13 belongs to the C/D box class of snoRNAs which contain the conserved sequence motifs known as the C box (UGAUGA) and the D box (CUGA). Most of the members of the box C/D family function in directing site-specific 2'-O-methylation of substrate RNAs.

snoRNA snR52 was initially discovered using a computational screen of the Saccharomyces cerevisiae genome; subsequent work identified Z13 in Schizosaccharomyces pombe. Further experiments have shown that snR52 is transcribed by RNA polymerase III.
