= Kwethluk Airport =

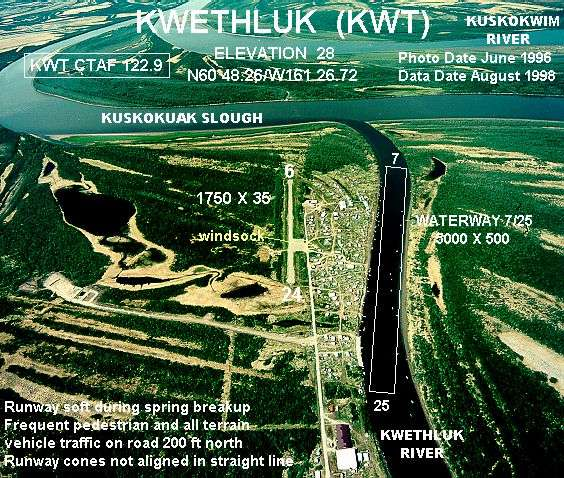
- IATA: KWT; ICAO: PFKW; FAA LID: KWT

Summary
- Airport type: Public
- Owner: State of Alaska DOT&PF - Central Region
- Serves: Kwethluk, Alaska
- Elevation AMSL: 30 ft / 9 m
- Coordinates: 60°47′25″N 161°26′37″W

Map
- Location of airport in Alaska

Runways
Direction	Length		Surface
Direction	ft	m	Surface
18/36	3,198	975	Gravel

Statistics
- Enplanements (2007): 2,923
- Source: Federal Aviation Administration

Kwethluk Airport (IATA: KWT, ICAO: PFKW, FAA LID: KWT) is a state-owned public-use airport located in Kwethluk, a city in the Bethel Census Area of the U.S. state of Alaska.

As per Federal Aviation Administration records, this airport had 2,923 passenger boardings (enplanements) in calendar year 2007, an increase of 26% from the 2,329 enplanements in 2006.

== Facilities ==
Kwethluk Airport has one gravel surfaced runway (18/36) measuring 3,198 by 75 ft. (975 by 23 m).

The airport was relocated from its former site at coordinates 60°48.26′N 161°26.72′W which had a 1,750 by 35 ft runway (6/24) and a 5,000 x 500 ft seaplane landing area.

== See also ==
- List of airports in Alaska
