= Akiak, Alaska =

Akiak Akiaq
- City
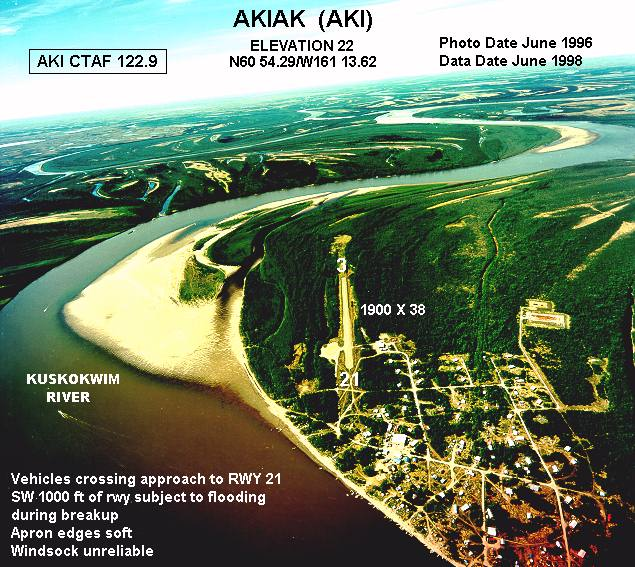
- Aerial view of Akiak, 1996

- Location in Alaska
- Coordinates: 60°54′36″N 161°13′6″W
- Country: United States
- State: Alaska
- Census Area: Bethel
- Incorporated: July 9, 1970

Government
  - Mayor: Olinka Jones
  - State senator: Lyman Hoffman (D)
  - State rep.: Conrad McCormick (D)

Area
  - Total: 3.00 sq mi (7.77 km^{2})
  - Land: 1.89 sq mi (4.89 km^{2})
  - Water: 1.11 sq mi (2.88 km^{2})
- Elevation: 13 ft (4 m)

Population (2020)
  - Total: 462
  - Density: 244.7/sq mi (94.48/km^{2})
- Time zone: UTC-9 (Alaska (AKST))
  - Summer (DST): UTC-8 (AKDT)
- ZIP code: 99552
- Area code: 907
- FIPS code: 02-00870
- GNIS feature ID: 1398012
- Website: akiaknativecommunity.org

Akiak (ACK-ee-ack) (Central Yupik: Akiaq) is a city in Bethel Census Area, Alaska, United States. The population was 462 at the 2020 census, up from 346 in 2010. It is the home of the Akiak Native Community.

== Geography and climate ==
Akiak is located at 60°54′36″N 161°13′6″W (60.912220, -161.21389) (Sec. 32, T010N, R067W, Seward Meridian), on the west bank of the Kuskokwim River, 42 miles (68 km) northeast of Bethel, on the Yukon–Kuskokwim Delta. Akiak is located in the Bethel Recording District.

According to the U.S. Census Bureau, the city has a total area of 3.1 square miles (8.1 km^{2}), of which 2.1 square miles (5.4 km^{2}) is land and 1.0 square mile (2.6 km^{2}), or 32.58%, is water. Precipitation averages 16 inches (410 mm) in this area, with snowfall of 50 inches (1,300 mm). Summer temperatures range from 42 °F (6 °C) to 62 °F (17 °C). Winter temperatures range from −2 °F (−19 °C) to 19 °F (−7 °C).

== History and culture ==
In 1880, the village, then known as Akkiagamute, had a population of 175. The current name Akiak means "the other side," since this place was a crossing to the Yukon River basin during the winter for area Yupiit. The community established a post office in 1916. The U.S. Public Health Service built a hospital in the 1920s. The city was incorporated in 1970. Akiak is a Yup'ik village with a reliance on subsistence and fishing activities.

=== Akiak Native Community ===
The Akiak Native Community is a federally recognized Alaska Native tribe located in Akiak.

== Demographics ==
Historical population
Census	Pop.	Note	%±
1880	175		—
1890	97		−44.6%
1920	150		—
1930	228		52.0%
1940	209		−8.3%
1950	168		−19.6%
1960	187		11.3%
1970	171		−8.6%
1980	198		15.8%
1990	285		43.9%
2000	309		8.4%
2010	346		12.0%
2020	462		33.5%
2022 (est.)	451	▼	−2.4%
U.S. Decennial Census

Akiak first appeared on the 1880 U.S. Census as the unincorporated Alaska Native (Inuit) village of "Akkiagamute." All 175 residents were Inuit. In 1890, it returned as "Akiagamiut" with 97 residents (all Alaska Native). It did not appear on the census again until 1920, then as Akiak. It has returned in every successive census. It formally incorporated in 1970.

=== 2020 census ===
As of the 2020 census, Akiak had a population of 462. The median age was 23.5 years. 41.1% of residents were under the age of 18 and 7.8% of residents were 65 years of age or older. For every 100 females there were 94.1 males, and for every 100 females age 18 and over there were 106.1 males age 18 and over.

0.0% of residents lived in urban areas, while 100.0% lived in rural areas.

There were 106 households in Akiak, of which 62.3% had children under the age of 18 living in them. Of all households, 34.9% were married-couple households, 23.6% were households with a male householder and no spouse or partner present, and 24.5% were households with a female householder and no spouse or partner present. About 17.9% of all households were made up of individuals and 2.8% had someone living alone who was 65 years of age or older.

There were 107 housing units, of which 0.9% were vacant. The homeowner vacancy rate was 0.0% and the rental vacancy rate was 4.2%.

Racial composition as of the 2020 census
Race	Number	Percent
White	18	3.9%
Black or African American	0	0.0%
American Indian and Alaska Native	442	95.7%
Asian	0	0.0%
Native Hawaiian and Other Pacific Islander	0	0.0%
Some other race	0	0.0%
Two or more races	2	0.4%
Hispanic or Latino (of any race)	0	0.0%

=== 2000 census ===
As of the 2000 census, there were 309 people, 69 households, and 54 families residing in the city. The population density was 157.2 inhabitants per square mile (60.7/km^{2}). There were 76 housing units at an average density of 38.7 units per square mile (14.9 units/km^{2}). The racial makeup of the city was 4.85% White, 92.88% Native American, and 2.27% from two or more races. 0.65% of the population were Hispanic or Latino of any race.

Of Akiak's 69 households, 53.6% had children under the age of 18 living with them, 43.5% were married couples living together, 20.3% had a female householder with no husband present, and 21.7% were non-families. 18.8% of all households were made up of individuals, and 4.3% had someone living alone who was 65 years of age or older. The average household size was 4.48 and the average family size was 5.24.

In the city, the age distribution of the population shows 43.4% under the age of 18, 11.3% from 18 to 24, 23.9% from 25 to 44, 14.6% from 45 to 64, and 6.8% who were 65 years of age or older. The median age was 21 years. For every 100 females, there were 122.3 males. For every 100 females age 18 and over, there were 105.9 males.

The median income for a household in the city was $26,250, and the median income for a family was $36,875. Males had a median income of $21,875 versus $11,667 for females. The per capita income for the city was $8,326. About 25.0% of families and 33.9% of the population were below the poverty line, including 40.3% of those under the age of eighteen and 6.7% of those 65 or over.

== Public services ==
A new well-water treatment plant and storage tank were recently completed. The school and clinic are connected directly to the water plant. Individual wells, septic systems and plumbing were installed in 14 HUD homes during 1997. Sewage disposal is currently by septic tanks, honey buckets or privies, but major improvements are underway. A piped water and gravity sewer system is under construction, with household plumbing. 67 homes need water and sewer service. Most residents are dependent upon the washeteria for laundry and bathing. The city provides septic pumping services. Electricity is provided by the city of Akiak.

The city is currently home to the world's third largest museum of taxidermy. Local hospitals or health clinics include Edith Kawagley Memorial Clinic (907-765-7125). Edith Kawagley Memorial Clinic is a Primary Health Care facility. Akiak is classified as an isolated village; it is found in EMS Region 7A in the Yukon/Kuskokwim Region. Emergency services have river and air access and are provided by a health aide.

== Education ==
The Yupiit School District is the local school district. There is one school located in the community, Akiak School, attended by 99 students.

== Economy and transportation ==
The majority of the year-round employment in Akiak is with the city, schools or other public services. Commercial fishing or BLM fire-fighting also provide seasonal income. Twenty-seven residents hold commercial fishing permits. The community is interested in developing a fish processing plant and tourism. Subsistence activities are important to residents. Poor fish returns since 1997 have significantly affected the community.

The airport has a gravel runway in good condition, measuring 3,196 feet (974 m) long by 75 feet (23 m) wide, at an elevation of 30 feet (9.1 m). The strip provides chartered or private air access year-round. Arctic Circle Air Service, Grant Aviation, and Hageland Aviation offer passenger flight service. Snow machines, ATVs, and skiffs are used extensively for local transportation to nearby villages. There are no docking facilities.

The town has no sales tax, property tax, or special taxes. The sale or importation of alcohol is banned in the village.

== Notable people ==
- Nora Guinn (1920–2005), judge
- Ivan M. Ivan, Yup'ik tribal leader and politician
