= Akiachak, Alaska =

Akiachak Akiacuaq / Akiacuar
- Census-designated place
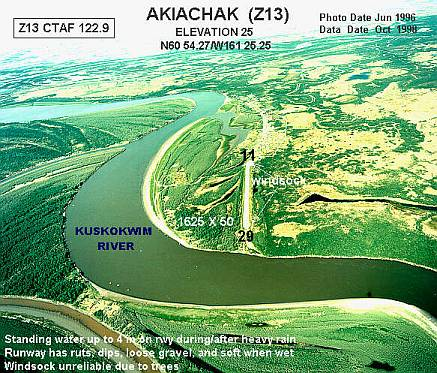
- Aerial photograph of Akiachak

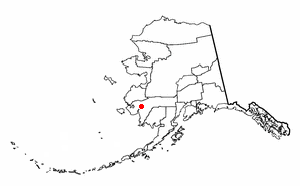
- Location of Akiachak, Alaska
- Coordinates: 60°53′58″N 161°24′48″W
- Country: United States
- State: Alaska
- Census Area: Bethel

Government
  - State senator: Lyman Hoffman (D)
  - State rep.: Nellie Jimmie (D)

Area
  - Total: 7.01 sq mi (18.16 km^{2})
  - Land: 7.01 sq mi (18.16 km^{2})
  - Water: 0 sq mi (0.00 km^{2})
- Elevation: 13 ft (4 m)

Population (2020)
  - Total: 677
  - Density: 96.6/sq mi (37.3/km^{2})
- Time zone: UTC-9 (Alaska (AKST))
  - Summer (DST): UTC-8 (AKDT)
- ZIP code: 99551
- Area code: 907
- FIPS code: 02-00760
- GNIS feature ID: 1398011
- Website: akiachak.org

Akiachak (ACK-ee-uh-chuck; Central Yupik: Akiacuaq) is a census-designated place (CDP) in the Bethel Census Area in the U.S. state of Alaska. The population was 677 in the 2020 census, up from 627 in 2010, and 585 in 2000.

== Geography and climate ==
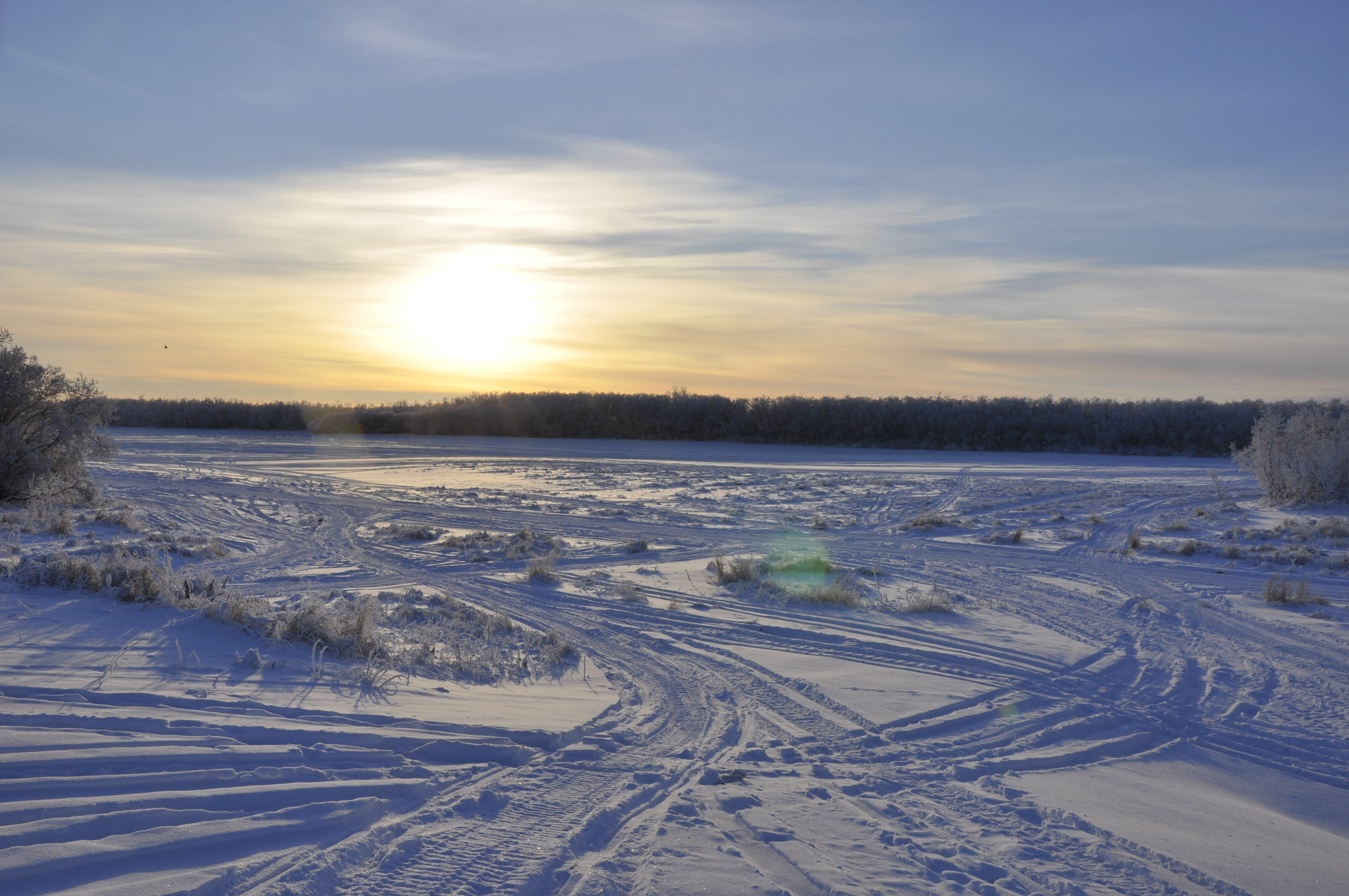
Ice road in Akiachak, AK

Akiachak is located at 60°54′34″N 161°25′53″W (60.909440, -161.43139), Sec. 36, T010N, R069W, Seward Meridian) in the Bethel Recording District.

According to the U.S. Census Bureau, the CDP has a total area of 7.5 square miles (19.5 km^{2}), of which 0.008 square miles (0.02 km^{2}), or 0.11%, is water.

Akiachak is located on the west bank of the Kuskokwim River in the Yukon–Kuskokwim Delta, 18 miles (29 km) northeast of Bethel. The area averages 16 inches (40.64 cm) of precipitation, with snowfall of 50 inches (127.00 cm). Summer temperatures range from 42 to 62 °F (6 to 17 °C). Winter temperatures range from −2 to 19 °F (−19 to −7 °C).

== History and culture ==
The Yup'ik peoples used this region as a seasonal subsistence site. Called Akiakchagamiut in the 1890 census, the village had a population of 43 then. A post office was established in 1934. It incorporated as a second-class city on February 7, 1974. The city government was dissolved in 1987, in favor of traditional village council governance.

A federally recognized Alaska Native tribal entity, the Akiachak Native Community, is located here. Akiachak is a Yup'ik village with a fishing and subsistence lifestyle. It has a strong traditional community, and was the first city in Alaska to dissolve its city government in favor of the Native village government. The sale, importation and possession of alcohol are banned in the village.

== Demographics ==
Historical population
Census	Pop.	Note	%±
1890	43		—
1900	165		283.7%
1940	156		—
1950	179		14.7%
1960	229		27.9%
1970	312		36.2%
1980	438		40.4%
1990	481		9.8%
2000	585		21.6%
2010	627		7.2%
2020	677		8.0%
U.S. Decennial Census

Akiachak first appeared on the 1890 U.S. Census as the unincorporated native village of "Akiakchagmiut." All 43 of its residents were Native. It returned as Akiachak in 1900. It did not appear again on the census until 1940, when it returned as "Akiachok." It returned in 1950 and every successive census as Akiachak. It formally incorporated in 1974. In 1990, it disincorporated and was assigned the status of census-designated place (CDP).

As of the census of 2000, there were 585 people, 133 households, and 111 families residing in the CDP. The population density was 86.5 inhabitants per square mile (33.4/km^{2}). There were 150 housing units at an average density of 22.2 units per square mile (8.6 units/km^{2}). The racial makeup of the CDP was 3.42% White, 92.31% Native American, and 4.27% from two or more races. 1.20% of the population were Hispanic or Latino of any race.

There were 133 households, out of which 63.9% had children under the age of 18 living with them, 59.4% were married couples living together, 15.0% had a female householder with no husband present, and 15.8% were non-families. 14.3% of all households were made up of individuals, and 2.3% had someone living alone who was 65 years of age or older. The average household size was 4.40 and the average family size was 4.89.

In the CDP, the population was spread out, with 44.4% under the age of 18, 9.6% from 18 to 24, 26.5% from 25 to 44, 14.5% from 45 to 64, and 5.0% who were 65 years of age or older. The median age was 22 years. For every 100 females, there were 121.6 males. For every 100 females age 18 and over, there were 118.1 males.

The median income for a household in the CDP was $35,833, and the median income for a family was $35,288. Males had a median income of $31,667 versus $18,750 for females. The per capita income for the CDP was $8,321. About 16.2% of families and 21.2% of the population were below the poverty line, including 25.7% of those under age 18 and 34.8% of those age 65 or over.

Currently half of the village is hooked up to a plumbing system. The village is currently working to write a grant in order to receive federal funding to plumb the rest of the village who still use honey buckets and must get their water from the river, rain, or snow. The village would like to purchase an incinerator and use the waste heat for public buildings. Electricity is provided by Akiachak Native Community Electric Co. There is one school located in the community, attended by over 200 students each year and growing. Local hospitals or health clinics include Akiachak Health Clinic. Akiachak Health Clinic is a Primary Health facility - they do not have authorization to prescribe drugs, give birth control, or handle much more than colds, small cuts, or routine strep throat treatment which is pervasive in the community. Most live births, birth control, injury, or serious illness will be referred to the Bethel hospital or patients may be air lifted to Anchorage in serious cases. Akiachak is classified as an isolated village. It is found in EMS Region 7A in the Yukon/Kuskokwim Region. Emergency Services have river and air access. Emergency service is provided by a health aide.

== Economy and transportation ==
The majority of year-round employment in Akiachak is in education and other public services. The Yupiit School District, which serves both Akiachak and nearby Tuluksak, has its headquarters located in the community. As part of the district's curriculum, students can take part in substance harvesting and moose hunts, in order to learn the traditions of the Yupiit communities.

Residents rely on seasonal employment such as commercial fishing, construction and BLM fire-fighting. 70 residents hold commercial fishing permits, and some work at canneries in Bristol Bay. The community is developing a fish processing facility and freezer. Subsistence activities provide most food sources. Poor fish returns since 1997 have significantly affected the community.

Akiachak Airport, a state-owned 1,649-foot (503 m) long by 40-foot (12 m) wide gravel airstrip and public seaplane facilities, provides scheduled and chartered services year-round to Akiachak. Relocation of the Akiachak Airport is planned for the future. Boats, snowmachines and ATVs are used extensively by locals on the Kuskokwim River. A winter trail exists to Bethel (19 mi). Barges deliver bulk fuel and supplies during the summer.
