= Oscarville, Alaska =

Oscarville Kuiggayagaq
- CDP
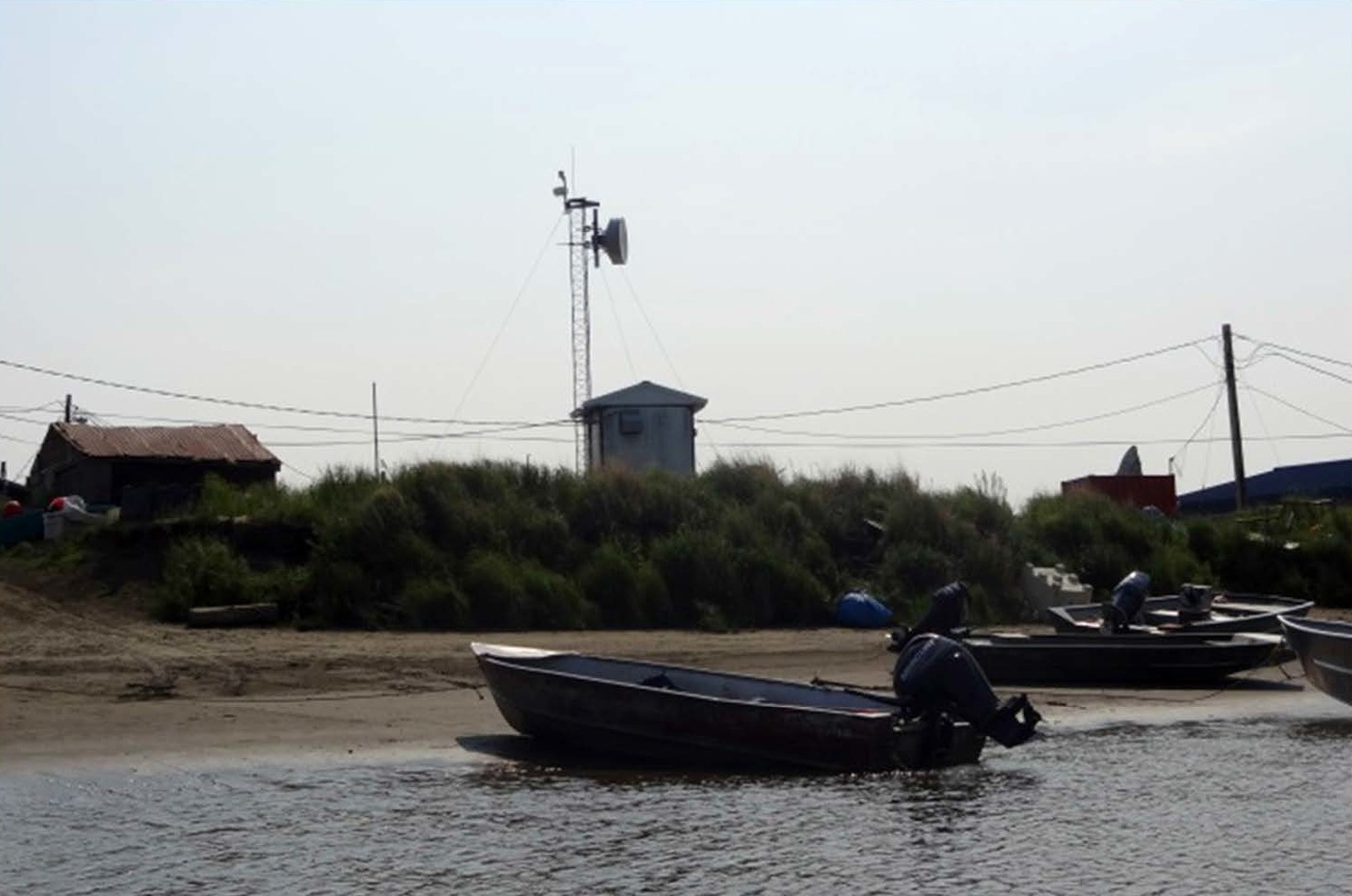

- Location within the state of Alaska
- Coordinates: 60°43′17″N 161°46′6″W
- Country: United States
- State: Alaska
- Census Area: Bethel

Government
  - State senator: Lyman Hoffman (D)
  - State rep.: Conrad McCormick (D)

Area
  - Total: 2.78 sq mi (7.20 km^{2})
  - Land: 2.60 sq mi (6.74 km^{2})
  - Water: 0.18 sq mi (0.46 km^{2})

Population (2020)
  - Total: 70
  - Density: 26.9/sq mi (10.38/km^{2})
- Time zone: UTC-9 (Alaska (AKST))
  - Summer (DST): UTC-8 (AKDT)
- ZIP code: 99559
- Area code: 907
- FIPS code: 02-58330

Oscarville (Central Yupik: Kuiggayagaq) is a census-designated place (CDP) in Bethel Census Area, Alaska, United States. As of the 2020 census, Oscarville had a population of 70.

== Geography ==
Oscarville is located at 60°43′17″N 161°46′6″W (60.721274, -161.768440).

According to the United States Census Bureau, the CDP has a total area of 1.6 square miles (4.1 km^{2}), of which, 1.5 square miles (3.9 km^{2}) of it is land and 0.1 square miles (0.26 km^{2}) of it (8.54%) is water.

== Demographics ==
Historical population
Census	Pop.	Note	%±
1940	11		—
1950	27		145.5%
1960	51		88.9%
1970	41		−19.6%
1980	56		36.6%
1990	57		1.8%
2000	61		7.0%
2010	70		14.8%
2020	70		0.0%
U.S. Decennial Census

Oscarville first reported on the 1940 U.S. Census as an unincorporated Native village. In 1980, it was made a census-designated place (CDP).

As of the census of 2000, there were 61 people, 15 households, and 12 families residing in the CDP. The population density was 40.6 inhabitants per square mile (15.7/km^{2}). There were 20 housing units at an average density of 13.3 per square mile (5.1/km^{2}). The racial makeup of the CDP was 98.36% Native American, 1.64% from two or more races, and 0.00% white.

There were 15 households, out of which 53.3% had children under the age of 18 living with them, 66.7% were married couples living together, 6.7% had a female householder with no husband present, and 20.0% were non-families. 20.0% of all households were made up of individuals, and none had someone living alone who was 65 years of age or older. The average household size was 4.07 and the average family size was 4.58.

In the CDP, the population was spread out, with 42.6% under the age of 18, 6.6% from 18 to 24, 27.9% from 25 to 44, 14.8% from 45 to 64, and 8.2% who were 65 years of age or older. The median age was 25 years. For every 100 women, there were 110.3 men. For every 100 women age 18 and over, there were 133.3 men.

The median income for a household in the CDP was $8,125, and the median income for a family was $16,250. Males had a median income of $24,375 versus $0 for females. The per capita income for the CDP was $5,824. There were 50.0% of families and 40.0% of the population living below the poverty line, including 18.8% of under eighteens and 100.0% of those over 64.

== Education ==
Lower Kuskokwim School District operates the Qugcuun Memorial School, K-12. As of 2018 the school had 13 students; for the 2023-2024 school year, there were 18 students. It is a bilingual English-Yup'ik school.
