= First Mission House =

Historic church in Alaska, United States

- U.S. National Register of Historic Places
- Alaska Heritage Resources Survey
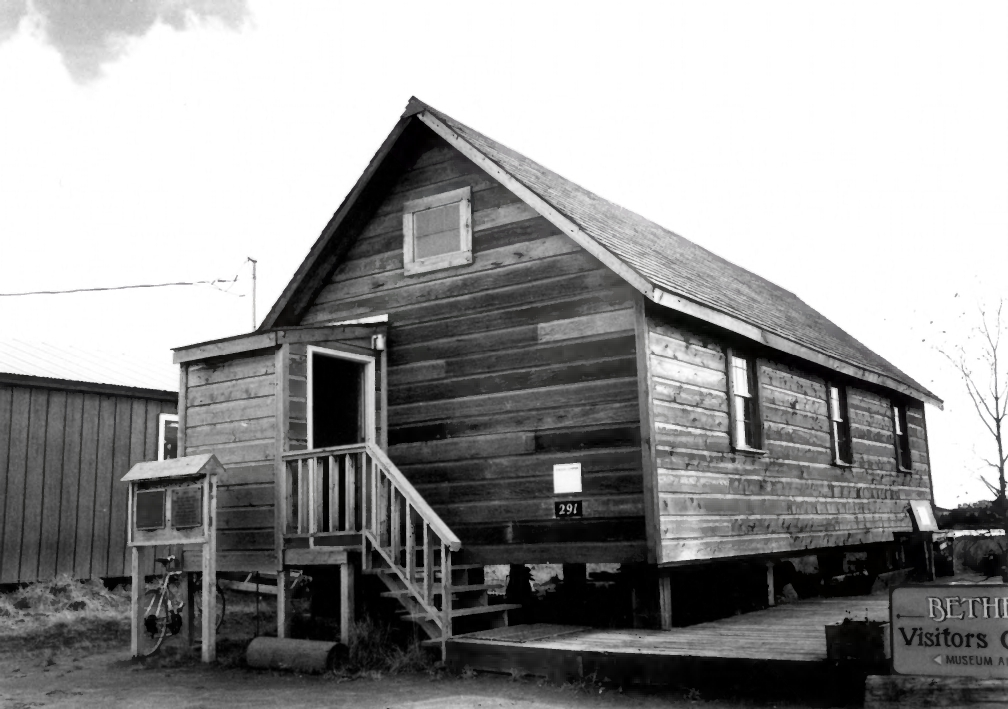

- Location within Alaska
- Location: 291 3rd Avenue, Bethel, Alaska
- Coordinates: 60°47′37″N 161°46′4″W
- Area: less than one acre
- Built: 1885
- Built by: John Kilbuck, William Weinland
- Architect: Hans Torgensen
- Architectural style: Vernacular Moravian mission
- NRHP reference No.: 90001551
- AHRS No.: BTH-013
- Added to NRHP: October 30, 1990

The First Mission House (First Mission House and Place of Worship; First Moravian Mission) is a historic church and mission house at 291 Third Avenue in Bethel, Alaska. The wood-frame structure was the first to be built in Bethel, in 1885. It was designed by Hans Torgersen, one of the first group of Moravian missionaries sent to the area, but he died in a boating accident before it was built, and it was completed by two priests with no significant construction experience. Although the building received some alterations, it was restored to its early appearance in 1985. The building has been moved three times, primarily due to erosion along the Kuskokwim River.

It was built in 1945 and added to the National Register of Historic Places in 1990.

== See also ==
- National Register of Historic Places listings in Bethel Census Area, Alaska
