= Z13 torpedo =

Z13
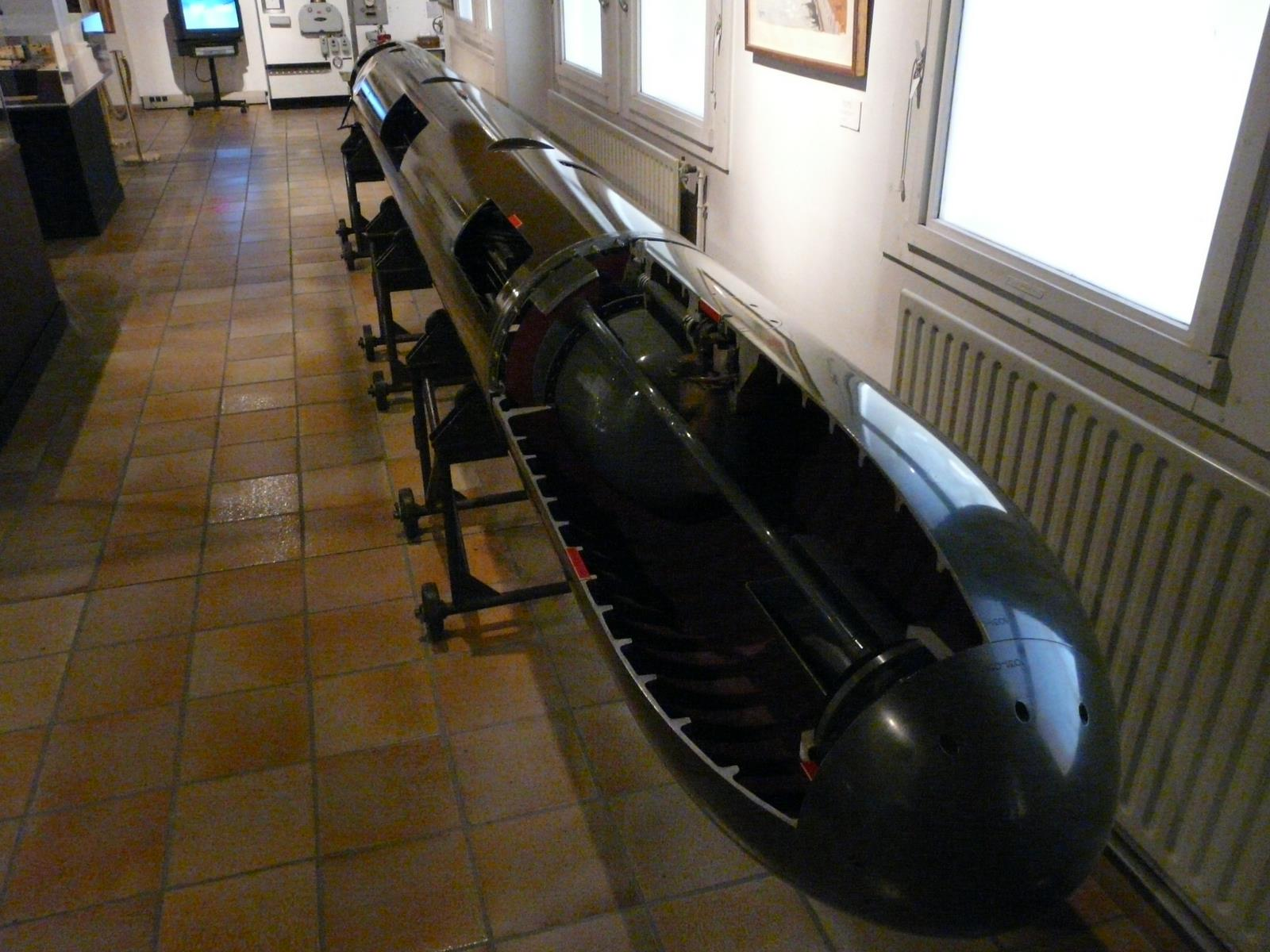
- Type: Torpedo
- Place of origin: France

Service history
- In service: 1960
- Used by: French Navy

Production history
- Manufacturer: DCAN Toulon

Specifications
- Length: 7.125 metres
- Diameter: 550 mm
- Warhead: TNT/Aluminium or HBX-3
- Warhead weight: 300 kg
- Engine: electric, two countrarotating propellers
- Operational range: 5 km
- Maximum depth: >1000 m
- Maximum speed: 25 knots (46 km/h; 29 mph)

The Z-13 was an electric heavy torpedo of the French Navy based on captured German technology.

It was designed to be fired from submerged submarines to target surface ships. The Z-13 was propelled by two electric motors, each driving a propeller. A Ni-Cd battery fed the engines.

The payload could be detonated either on contact, or by a magnetic exploder.
