= Lime Village, Alaska =

Lime Village Hek'dichen Hdakaq'
- Census-designated place
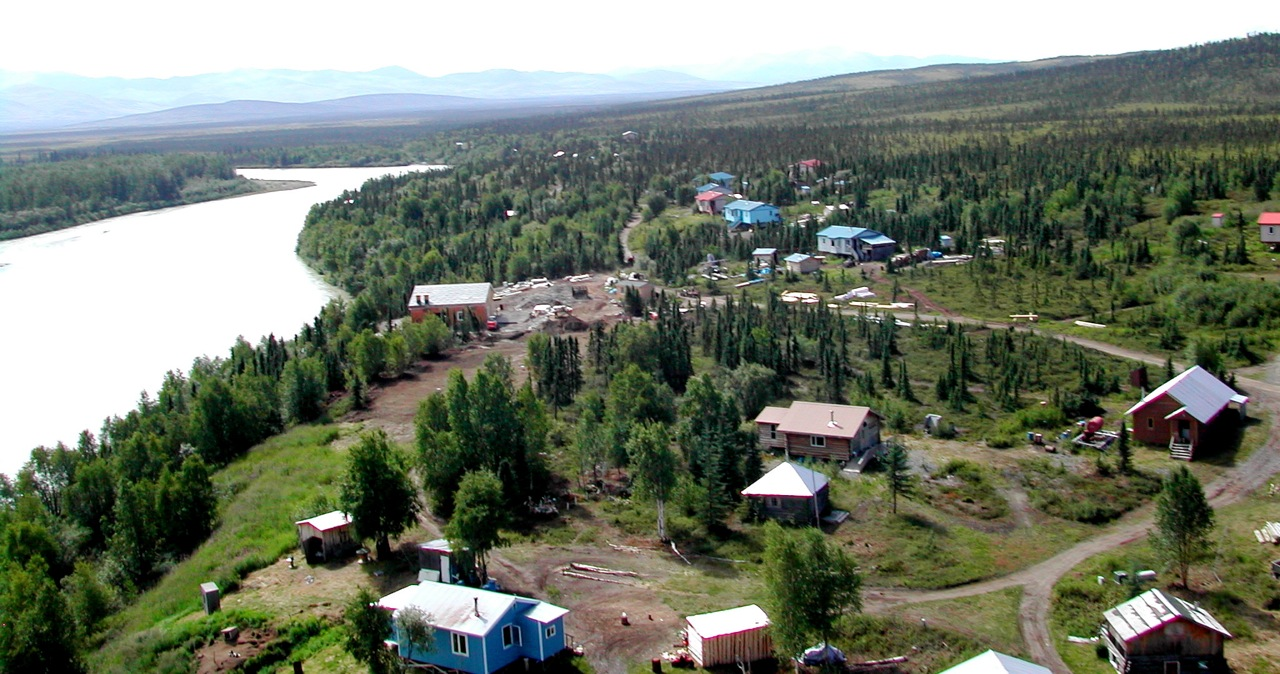

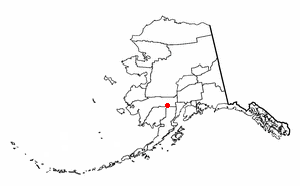
- Location of Lime Village, Alaska
- Coordinates: 61°20′29″N 155°29′27″W
- Country: United States
- State: Alaska
- Census Area: Bethel

Government
  - State senator: Lyman Hoffman (D)
  - State rep.: Bryce Edgmon (I)

Area
  - Total: 78.71 sq mi (203.87 km^{2})
  - Land: 76.52 sq mi (198.19 km^{2})
  - Water: 2.19 sq mi (5.67 km^{2})

Population (2020)
  - Total: 13
  - Density: 0.18/sq mi (0.07/km^{2})
- Time zone: UTC-9 (Alaska (AKST))
  - Summer (DST): UTC-8 (AKDT)
- ZIP code: 99557
- Area code: 907
- FIPS code: 02-44030
- GNIS ID: 2418687

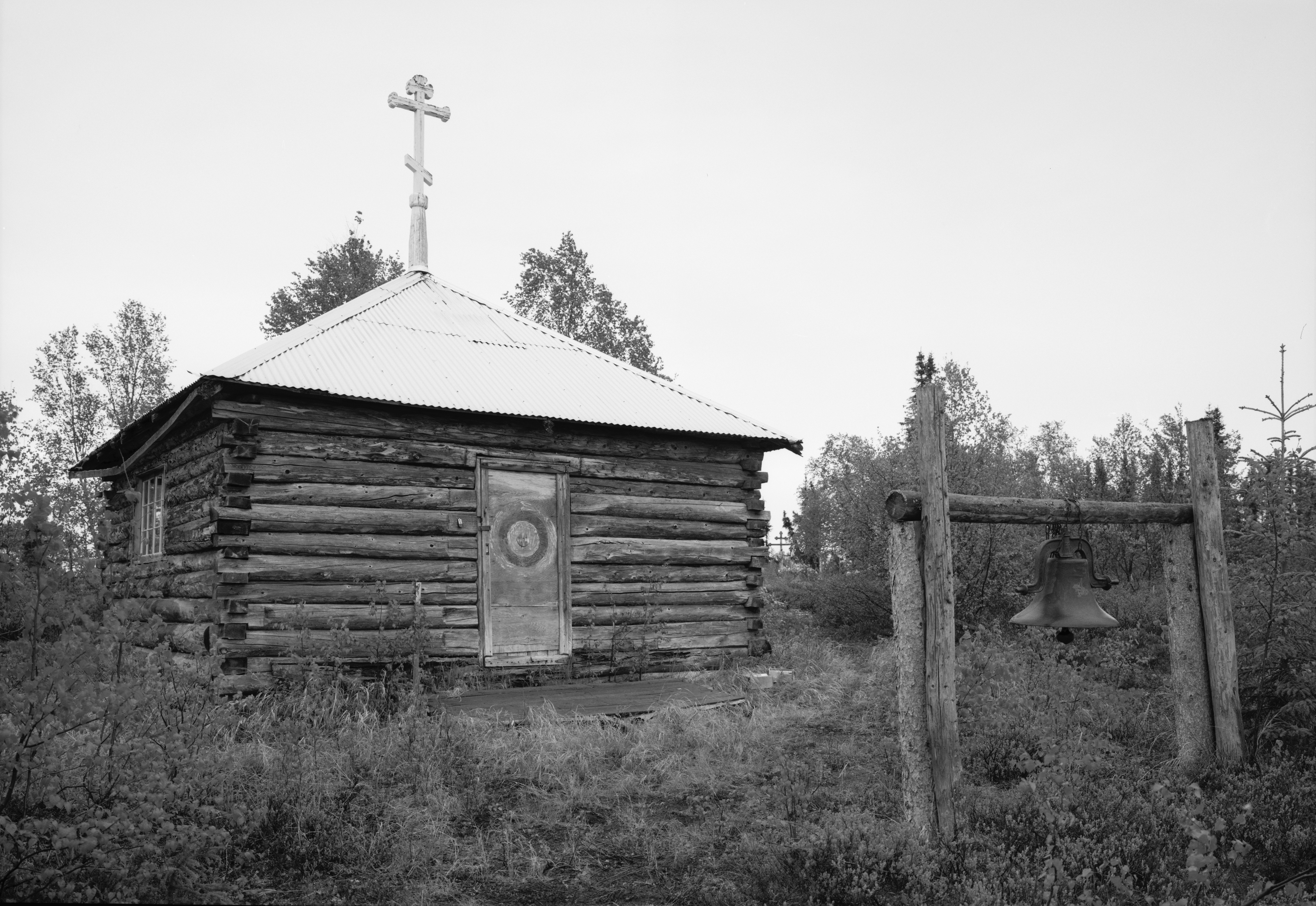
Sts. Constantine and Helen Chapel

Lime (Denaʼina: Hek'dichen Hdakaq') is a census-designated place (CDP) in Bethel Census Area, Alaska, United States. The 2020 census found a population of 13, down from 29 in 2010. It has also been known as Hungry Village.

In July 2008, Lime Village gained notoriety when it was reported that their gasoline prices were more than double of the already-high national average of over $4/gallon with Lime Village selling regular unleaded gasoline at $8.55/gallon. The high prices were considered ironic considering that Alaska is one of the main suppliers of oil in the United States, but have the highest state average due to scattered villages throughout Alaska such as Lime Village making it difficult to transport oil and other goods.

== Geography ==
Lime Village is located at 61°20′29″N 155°29′27″W (61.341383, -155.490944).

According to the United States Census Bureau, the CDP has a total area of 82.5 square miles (214 km^{2}), of which, 80.3 square miles (208 km^{2}) of it is land and 2.2 square miles (5.7 km^{2}) of it (2.67%) is water.

== Demographics ==
Historical population
| Census | Pop. | Note | %± |
|---|---|---|---|
| 1940 | 38 | | — |
| 1950 | 29 | | −23.7% |
| 1970 | 25 | | — |
| 1980 | 48 | | 92.0% |
| 1990 | 42 | | −12.5% |
| 2000 | 6 | | −85.7% |
| 2010 | 29 | | 383.3% |
| 2020 | 13 | | −55.2% |
U.S. Decennial Census

Lime Village first appeared on the 1940 U.S. Census as the unincorporated village of Hungry. It did not appear on the 1960 census. It returned in 1970 as Lime Village. It was made a census-designated place (CDP) in 1980.

=== 2000 ===
As of the census of 2000, there were 6 people, 5 households, and 0 families residing in the CDP. The population density was 0.1 inhabitants per square mile (0.039/km^{2}). There were 24 housing units at an average density of 0.3 per square mile (0.12/km^{2}). The racial makeup of the CDP was 83.33% White, and 16.67% from two or more races.

There were 5 households, out of which none were married couples living together, and 100.0% were non-families. 80.0% of all households were made up of individuals, and none had someone living alone who was 65 years of age or older. The average household size was 1.20 and the average family size was 0.00.

In the CDP the population was spread out, with 66.7% from 25 to 44, 33.3% from 45 to 64. The median age was 44 years. For every 100 females, there were 200.0 males. For every 100 females age 18 and over, there were 200.0 males.

=== 2010 ===
As of the census of 2010, there were 29 people and 11 households. The population density was 0.1 inhabitants per square mile (0.039/km^{2}). There were 24 housing units at an average density of 0.3 per square mile (0.12/km^{2}). The racial makeup of the CDP was 3.4% White, 93.1% Native American (79.3% specified Alaska Native), and 3.4% from two or more races.

== School ==
The Lime Village School, formerly operated by the Iditarod Area School District, closed in 2007, when the enrollment of six students failed to meet the state-mandated minimum of ten students. As of Fall 2008 the school remained closed. The lack of access to local schooling has increased urban migration, though many migrants continue to spend summers in the village.
