= Napaskiak, Alaska =

Napaskiak Napaskiaq
- City
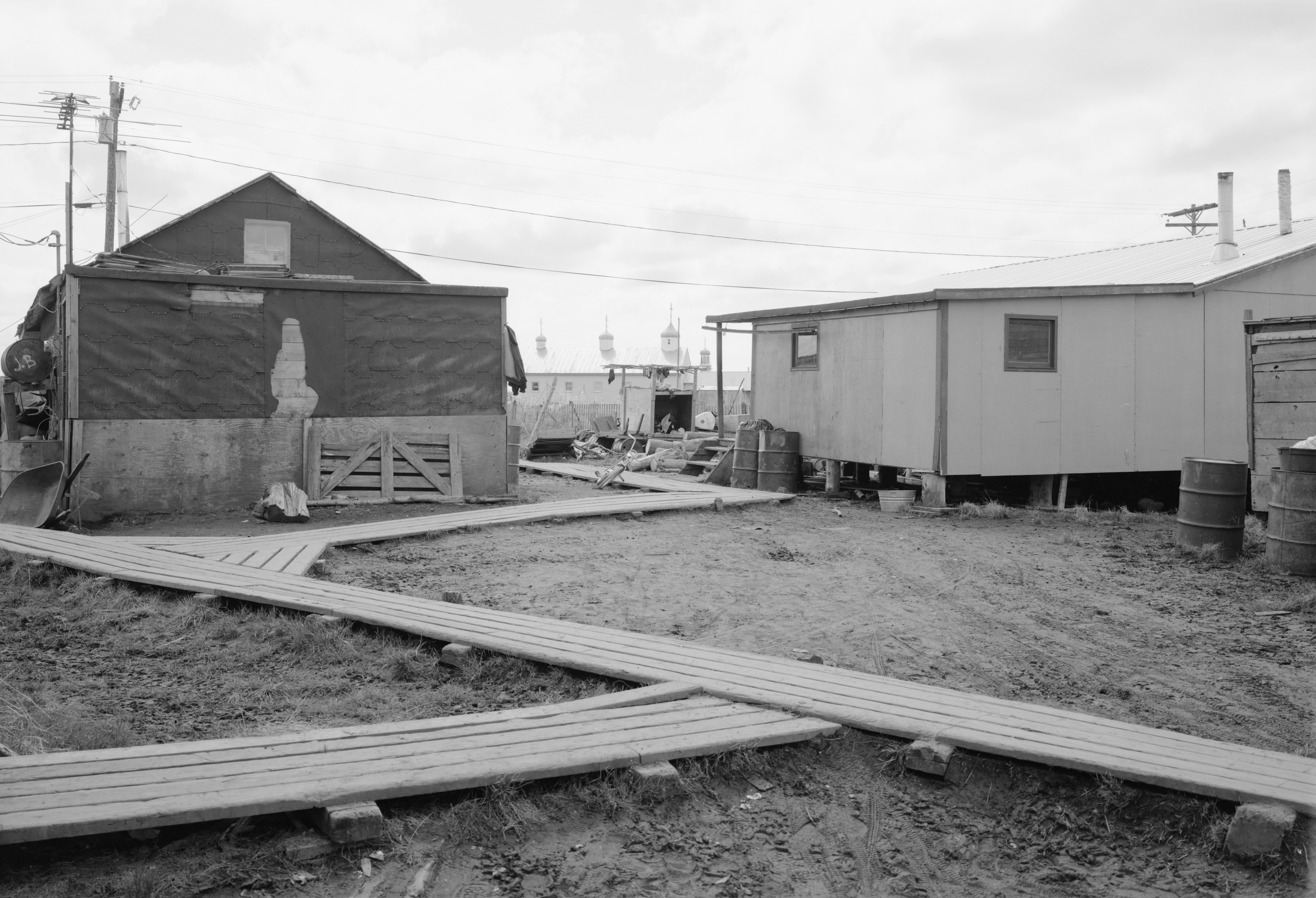

- Location in Alaska
- Coordinates: 60°42′25″N 161°45′39″W
- Country: United States
- State: Alaska
- Census Area: Bethel
- Incorporated: October 27, 1971

Government
  - Mayor: Timothy Jacob
  - State senator: Lyman Hoffman (D)
  - State rep.: Conrad McCormick (D)

Area
  - Total: 3.17 sq mi (8.22 km^{2})
  - Land: 2.90 sq mi (7.51 km^{2})
  - Water: 0.27 sq mi (0.71 km^{2})
- Elevation: 3.3 ft (1 m)

Population (2020)
  - Total: 509
  - Density: 175.5/sq mi (67.77/km^{2})
- Time zone: UTC-9 (Alaska (AKST))
  - Summer (DST): UTC-8 (AKDT)
- Zip code: 99559
- Area code: 907
- FIPS code: 02-52720
- GNIS feature ID: 1406834

Napaskiak (Central Yupik: Napaskiaq) is a city in Bethel Census Area, Alaska, United States. As of the 2020 census, Napaskiak had a population of 509.

== Geography ==
Napaskiak is located at 60°42′25″N 161°45′39″W.

According to the United States Census Bureau, the city has a total area of 3.8 square miles (9.8 km^{2}), of which, 3.5 square miles (9.1 km^{2}) of it is land and 0.3 square miles (0.78 km^{2}) of it (9.14%) is water.

== Demographics ==
Historical population
Census	Pop.	Note	%±
1880	196		—
1890	97		−50.5%
1940	67		—
1950	121		80.6%
1960	154		27.3%
1970	188		22.1%
1980	244		29.8%
1990	328		34.4%
2000	390		18.9%
2010	405		3.8%
2020	509		25.7%
U.S. Decennial Census

Napaskiak first appeared on the 1880 U.S. Census as the unincorporated Yupik village of "Napaskiagamute." All 196 residents were Yupik. In 1890, it returned as "Napaskeagamiut." All residents that year also were native. It did not appear on the census again until 1940, under the present spelling of Napaskiak. In 1950 and 1960, it was returned under the spelling of "Napaiskak." The spelling was reverted to the prior Napaskiak in 1970. It was formally incorporated the following year (1971).

=== 2020 census ===
As of the 2020 census, Napaskiak had a population of 509. The median age was 23.8 years. 36.3% of residents were under the age of 18 and 7.1% of residents were 65 years of age or older. For every 100 females there were 112.1 males, and for every 100 females age 18 and over there were 102.5 males age 18 and over.

There were 125 households in Napaskiak, of which 71.2% had children under the age of 18 living in them. Of all households, 43.2% were married-couple households, 15.2% were households with a male householder and no spouse or partner present, and 28.8% were households with a female householder and no spouse or partner present. About 7.2% of all households were made up of individuals and 3.2% had someone living alone who was 65 years of age or older.

There were 143 housing units, of which 12.6% were vacant. The homeowner vacancy rate was 0.0% and the rental vacancy rate was 0.0%.

0.0% of residents lived in urban areas, while 100.0% lived in rural areas.

Racial composition as of the 2020 census
Race	Number	Percent
White	12	2.4%
Black or African American	0	0.0%
American Indian and Alaska Native	488	95.9%
Asian	0	0.0%
Native Hawaiian and Other Pacific Islander	0	0.0%
Some other race	3	0.6%
Two or more races	6	1.2%
Hispanic or Latino (of any race)	5	1.0%

=== 2000 census ===
As of the census of 2000, there were 390 people, 82 households, and 70 families residing in the city. The population density was 112.3 inhabitants per square mile (43.4/km^{2}). There were 95 housing units at an average density of 27.4 units per square mile (10.6 units/km^{2}). The racial makeup of the city was 1.54% White, 97.44% Native American, 0.26% Asian, and 0.77% from two or more races. 0.26% of the population were Hispanic or Latino of any race.

There were 82 households, out of which 56.1% had children under the age of 18 living with them, 59.8% were married couples living together, 18.3% had a female householder with no husband present, and 14.6% were non-families. 13.4% of all households were made up of individuals, and 8.5% had someone living alone who was 65 years of age or older. The average household size was 4.76 and the average family size was 5.24.

In the city, the age distribution of the population shows 43.6% under the age of 18, 10.3% from 18 to 24, 27.7% from 25 to 44, 11.8% from 45 to 64, and 6.7% who were 65 years of age or older. The median age was 22 years. For every 100 females, there were 104.2 males. For every 100 females age 18 and over, there were 96.4 males.

The median income for a household in the city was $31,806, and the median income for a family was $32,083. Males had a median income of $25,469 versus $25,000 for females. The per capita income for the city was $8,162. About 16.9% of families and 20.2% of the population were below the poverty line, including 20.1% of those under age 18 and 20.0% of those age 65 or over.

== Education ==
Lower Kuskokwim School District operates the Zacharias John Williams Memorial School, PreK-12. As of 2018 it has 155 students, with 90% classified as learners of English as a second language, 85% are on free or reduced lunch programs, and the majority are of Central Yupik Eskimo origins; that year only two students were not Yupik. That year the school had 34 employees, with four of them being native Alaskans; the employees included 16 teachers. The current building opened in October 2016, and the original building opened in 1982.
