= Lower Kalskag, Alaska =

Lower Kalskag, Alaska Qalqaq
- City
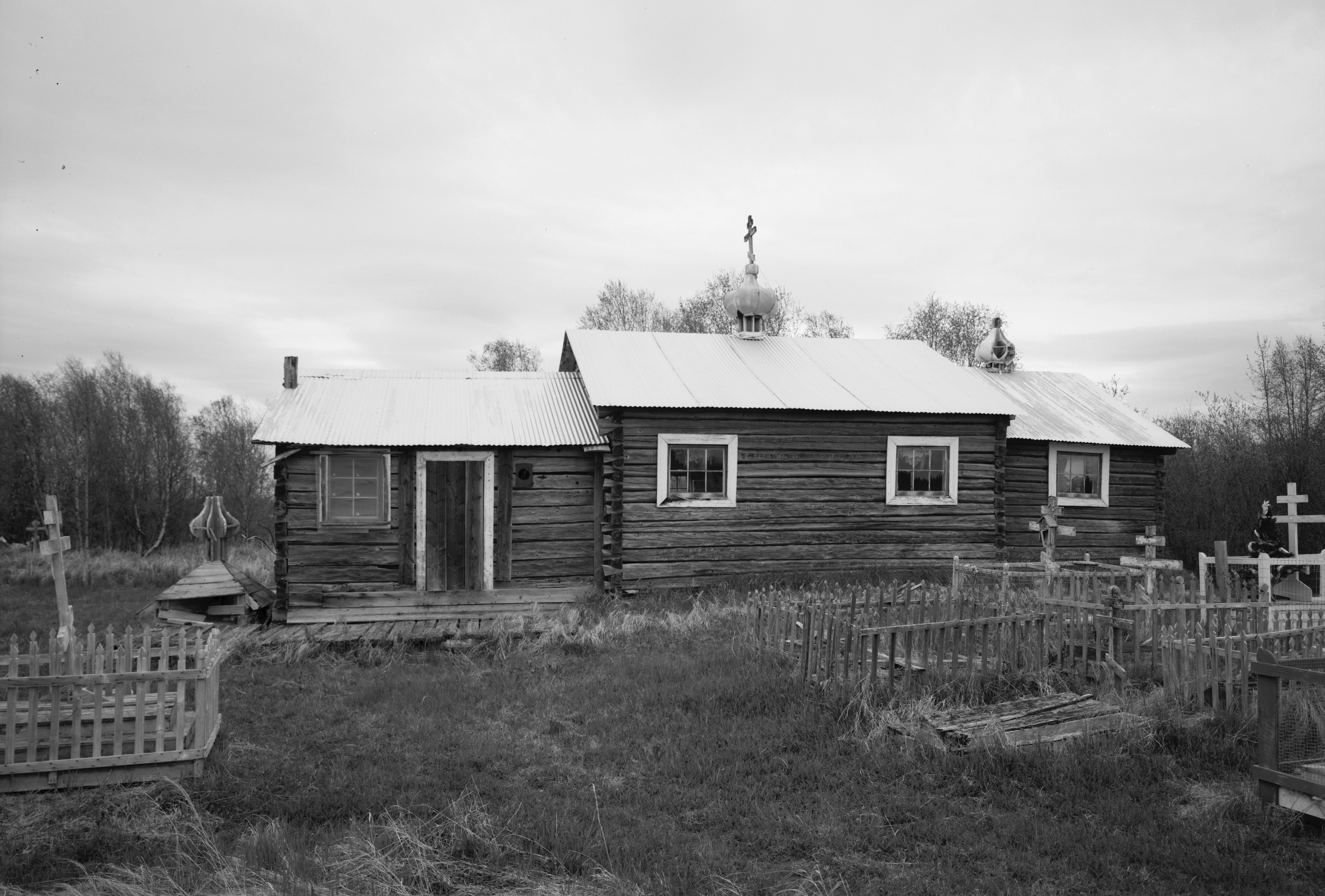
- The historic St. Seraphim Chapel

- Location in Alaska
- Coordinates: 61°30′49″N 160°21′33″W
- Country: United States
- State: Alaska
- Census Area: Bethel
- Incorporated: 1969

Government
  - Mayor: Crim Evan
  - State senator: Lyman Hoffman (D)
  - State rep.: Bryce Edgmon (I)

Area
  - Total: 1.75 sq mi (4.53 km^{2})
  - Land: 1.24 sq mi (3.22 km^{2})
  - Water: 0.51 sq mi (1.31 km^{2})
- Elevation: 26 ft (8 m)

Population (2020)
  - Total: 278
  - Density: 223.4/sq mi (86.27/km^{2})
- Time zone: UTC-9 (Alaska (AKST))
  - Summer (DST): UTC-8 (AKDT)
- ZIP code: 99626
- Area code: 907
- FIPS code: 02-45460
- GNIS feature ID: 1405763

Lower Kalskag (Central Yupik: Qalqaq; Russian: Лоуэр-Калскаг) is a city in Bethel Census Area, Alaska, United States. It is twenty-six miles west of Aniak. As of the 2020 census, Lower Kalskag had a population of 278.

== Geography ==
Lower Kalskag is located at 61°30′49″N 160°21′33″W (61.513735, -160.359050).

According to the United States Census Bureau, the city has a total area of 1.7 square miles (4.4 km^{2}), of which, 1.3 square miles (3.4 km^{2}) of it is land and 0.4 square miles (1.0 km^{2}) of it (25.58%) is water.

Lower Kalskag, referred to by the locals as just "Lower", is linked to Upper Kalskag (Upper) by a single two mile maintained gravel/dirt road.

Lower Kalskag is accessible only by small plane, boat, and vehicles via the river "ice road" (Winter only).

== Demographics ==
Historical population
| Census | Pop. | Note | %± |
|---|---|---|---|
| 1940 | 76 | | — |
| 1950 | 88 | | 15.8% |
| 1960 | 122 | | 38.6% |
| 1970 | 183 | | 50.0% |
| 1980 | 246 | | 34.4% |
| 1990 | 291 | | 18.3% |
| 2000 | 267 | | −8.2% |
| 2010 | 282 | | 5.6% |
| 2020 | 278 | | −1.4% |
U.S. Decennial Census

Lower Kalskag first appeared on the 1940 U.S. Census erroneously as the unincorporated village of Kalskag. In 1950, it reported as Lower Kalskag. It formally incorporated in 1969.

=== 2020 census ===
As of the 2020 census, Lower Kalskag had a population of 278. The median age was 30.0 years. 34.5% of residents were under the age of 18 and 9.4% of residents were 65 years of age or older. For every 100 females there were 107.5 males, and for every 100 females age 18 and over there were 102.2 males age 18 and over.

0.0% of residents lived in urban areas, while 100.0% lived in rural areas.

There were 82 households in Lower Kalskag, of which 58.5% had children under the age of 18 living in them. Of all households, 34.1% were married-couple households, 29.3% were households with a male householder and no spouse or partner present, and 25.6% were households with a female householder and no spouse or partner present. About 19.5% of all households were made up of individuals and 4.9% had someone living alone who was 65 years of age or older.

There were 95 housing units, of which 13.7% were vacant. The homeowner vacancy rate was 0.0% and the rental vacancy rate was 4.0%.

Racial composition as of the 2020 census
| Race | Number | Percent |
|---|---|---|
| White | 6 | 2.2% |
| Black or African American | 0 | 0.0% |
| American Indian and Alaska Native | 262 | 94.2% |
| Asian | 0 | 0.0% |
| Native Hawaiian and Other Pacific Islander | 0 | 0.0% |
| Some other race | 0 | 0.0% |
| Two or more races | 10 | 3.6% |
| Hispanic or Latino (of any race) | 2 | 0.7% |

=== 2000 census ===
As of the census of 2000, there were 267 people, 66 households, and 54 families residing in the city. The population density was 208.2 inhabitants per square mile (80.4/km^{2}). There were 79 housing units at an average density of 61.6 units per square mile (23.8 units/km^{2}). The racial makeup of the city was 4.49% White, 88.76% Native American, and 6.74% from two or more races.

There were 66 households, out of which 62.1% had children under the age of 18 living with them, 47.0% were married couples living together, 24.2% had a female householder with no husband present, and 16.7% were non-families. 15.2% of all households were made up of individuals, and 1.5% had someone living alone who was 65 years of age or older. The average household size was 4.05 and the average family size was 4.53.

In the city, the population was spread out, with 44.9% under the age of 18, 13.5% from 18 to 24, 22.1% from 25 to 44, 15.4% from 45 to 64, and 4.1% who were 65 years of age or older. The median age was 21 years. For every 100 females, there were 96.3 males. For every 100 females age 18 and over, there were 98.6 males.

The median income for a household in the city was $25,625, and the median income for a family was $27,500. Males had a median income of $16,667 versus $36,250 for females. The per capita income for the city was $7,654. About 36.7% of families and 40.6% of the population were below the poverty line, including 51.4% of those under the age of eighteen and 35.7% of those 65 or over.
