= Tuluksak, Alaska =

Tuluksak Tuulkessaaq
- CDP
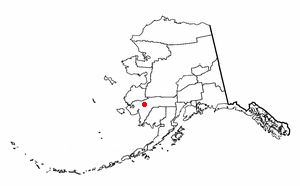
- Location of Tuluksak, Alaska
- Coordinates: 61°6′9″N 160°57′38″W
- Country: United States
- State: Alaska
- Census Area: Bethel
- Incorporated: October 28, 1970
- Disincorporated: 1997

Government
  - State senator: Lyman Hoffman (D)
  - State rep.: Nellie Jimmie (D)

Area
  - Total: 3.02 sq mi (7.82 km^{2})
  - Land: 2.93 sq mi (7.58 km^{2})
  - Water: 0.097 sq mi (0.25 km^{2})

Population (2020)
  - Total: 444
  - Density: 151.7/sq mi (58.59/km^{2})
- Time zone: UTC-9 (Alaska (AKST))
  - Summer (DST): UTC-8 (AKDT)
- ZIP code: 99679
- Area code: 907
- FIPS code: 02-78790

Tuluksak (Central Yupik: Tuulkessaaq) is a census-designated place (CDP) in Bethel Census Area, Alaska, United States. As of the 2020 census, Tuluksak had a population of 444.

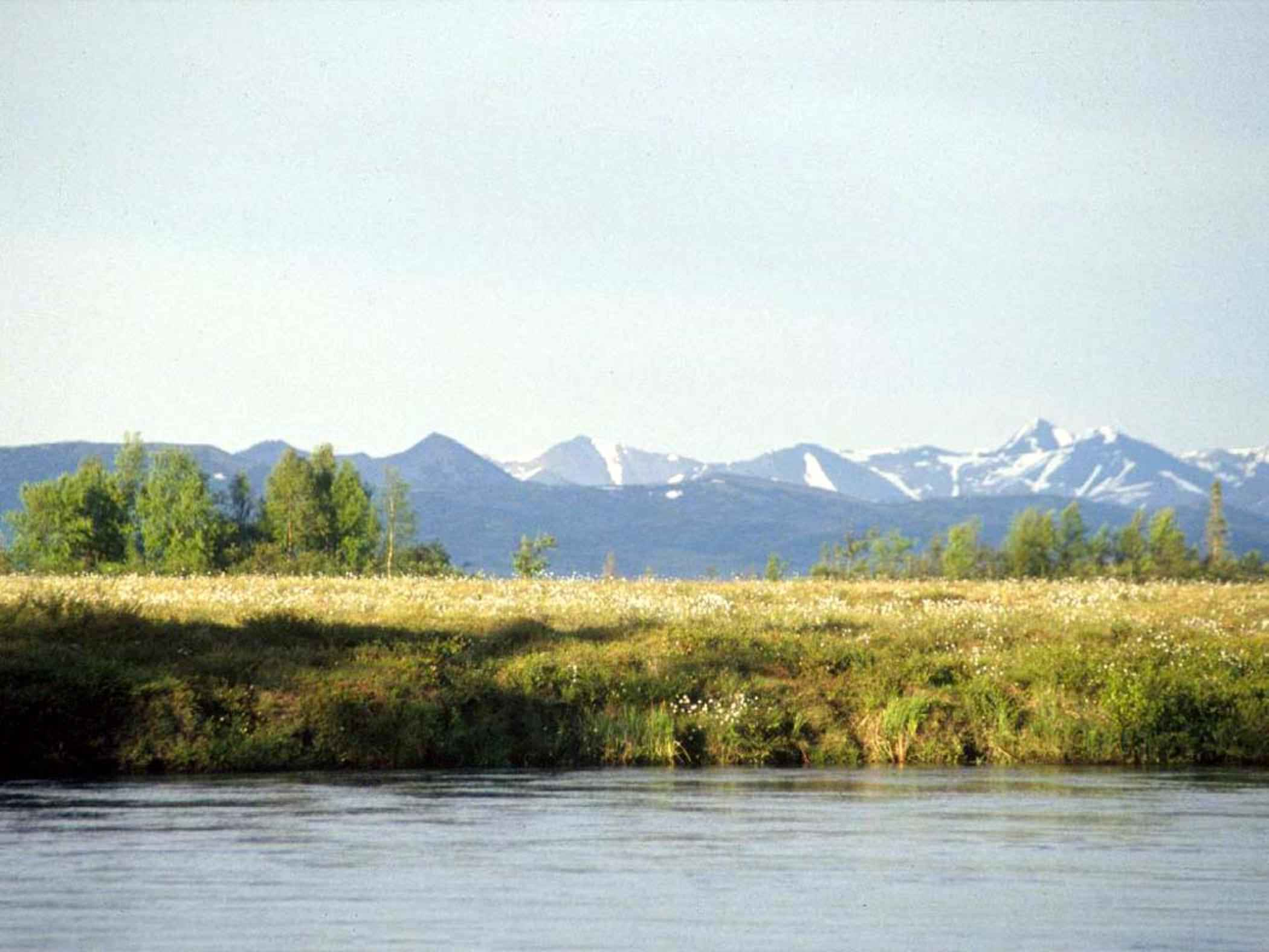
The view spans across the tundra from the banks of the Tuluksak river

== Geography ==
Tuluksak is located at 61°06′09″N 160°57′38″W.

According to the United States Census Bureau, the CDP has a total area of 3.1 square miles (8.0 km^{2}), of which, 3.0 square miles (7.8 km^{2}) of it is land and 0.1 square miles (0.26 km^{2}) of it (2.24%) is water.

== Demographics ==
Historical population
| Census | Pop. | Note | %± |
|---|---|---|---|
| 1880 | 150 | | — |
| 1890 | 62 | | −58.7% |
| 1920 | 73 | | — |
| 1930 | 96 | | 31.5% |
| 1940 | 88 | | −8.3% |
| 1950 | 116 | | 31.8% |
| 1960 | 137 | | 18.1% |
| 1970 | 195 | | 42.3% |
| 1980 | 236 | | 21.0% |
| 1990 | 358 | | 51.7% |
| 2000 | 428 | | 19.6% |
| 2010 | 373 | | −12.9% |
| 2020 | 444 | | 19.0% |
U.S. Decennial Census

Tuluksak first appeared on the 1880 U.S. Census as an unincorporated Inuit village. All 150 residents were Inuit. In 1890, it returned as "Tuluksagmiut." All residents were listed as Native. It did not report again until 1920, when it returned under its original 1880 spelling of Tuluksak. It has returned in every successive census to date. In 1970, it formally incorporated. In 1997, it disincorporated as a city and was reclassified as a census-designated place (CDP).

As of the census of 2000, there were 428 people, 86 households, and 76 families residing in the CDP. The population density was 140.1 inhabitants per square mile (54.1/km^{2}). There were 93 housing units at an average density of 30.4 per square mile (11.7/km^{2}). The racial makeup of the CDP was 5.14% White, 94.16% Native American and 0.70% Asian.

There were 86 households, out of which 53.5% had children under the age of 18 living with them, 59.3% were married couples living together, 9.3% had a female householder with no husband present, and 11.6% were non-families. 11.6% of all households were made up of individuals, and 3.5% had someone living alone who was 65 years of age or older. The average household size was 4.98 and the average family size was 5.37.

In the CDP, the population was spread out, with 39.7% under the age of 18, 12.4% from 18 to 24, 28.7% from 25 to 44, 11.4% from 45 to 64, and 7.7% who were 65 years of age or older. The median age was 24 years. For every 100 females, there were 117.3 males. For every 100 females age 18 and over, there were 106.4 males.

The median income for a household in the CDP was $31,563, and the median income for a family was $33,125. Males had a median income of $21,250 versus $31,250 for females. The per capita income for the CDP was $7,132. About 21.3% of families and 27.9% of the population were below the poverty line, including 33.6% of those under age 18 and 11.1% of those age 65 or over.
