= Bethel Census Area, Alaska =

Census area in Alaska, United States

- Borough
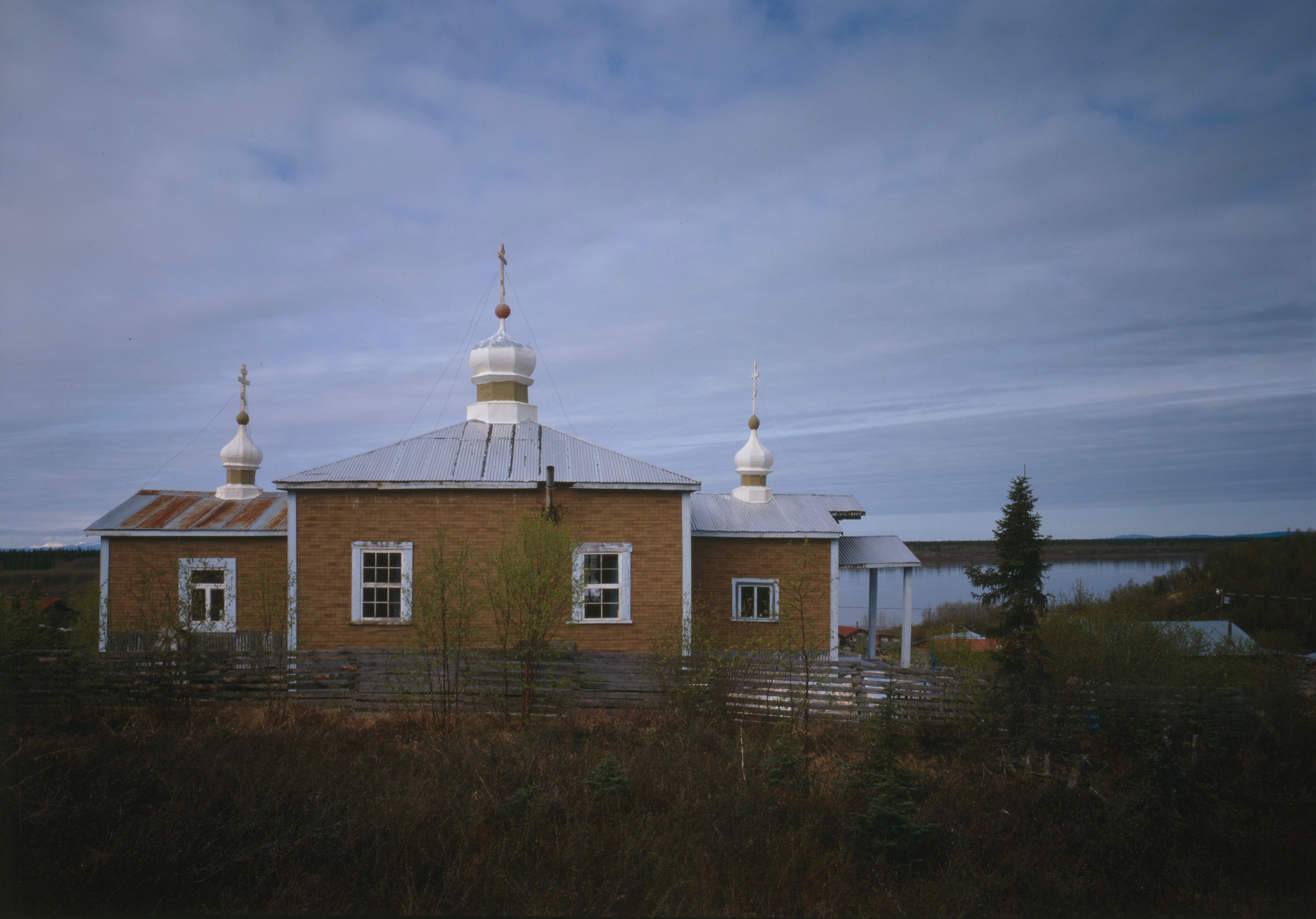
- St. Sergius Chapel, Chuathbaluk

- Location within the U.S. state of Alaska
- Coordinates: 60°45′N 160°30′W
- Country: United States
- State: Alaska
- Established: 1980
- Largest city: Bethel

Area
  - Total: 45,504 sq mi (117,850 km^{2})
  - Land: 40,570 sq mi (105,100 km^{2})
  - Water: 4,934 sq mi (12,780 km^{2}) 10.8%

Population (2020)
  - Total: 18,666
  - Estimate (2025): 18,391 ▼
  - Density: 0.42/sq mi (0.16/km^{2})
- Time zone: UTC−9 (Alaska)
  - Summer (DST): UTC−8 (ADT)
- Congressional district: At-large

Bethel Census Area is a census area in the U.S. state of Alaska. As of the 2020 census, the population is 18,666, up from 17,013 in 2010. It is part of the unorganized borough and therefore has no borough seat. Its largest community is the city of Bethel, which is also the largest city in the unorganized borough.

== Geography ==
According to the United States Census Bureau, the census area has an area of 45,504 square miles (117,850 km^{2}), of which 40,570 square miles (105,100 km^{2}) is land and 4,934 square miles (12,780 km^{2}) (10.8%) is water. Its territory includes the large Nunivak Island in the Bering Sea.

Its land area is comparable to that of Kentucky, which has an area of slightly under forty thousand square miles.

=== Adjacent boroughs and census areas ===
- Kusilvak Census Area, Alaska - northwest
- Yukon–Koyukuk Census Area, Alaska - north
- Matanuska-Susitna Borough, Alaska - east
- Kenai Peninsula Borough, Alaska - southeast
- Lake and Peninsula Borough, Alaska - south
- Dillingham Census Area, Alaska - south

=== National protected areas ===
- Alaska Maritime National Wildlife Refuge (part of the Bering Sea unit)
  - Bering Sea Wilderness
- Lake Clark National Park and Preserve (part)
  - Lake Clark Wilderness (part)
- Togiak National Wildlife Refuge (part)
  - Togiak Wilderness (part)
- Yukon Delta National Wildlife Refuge (part)
  - Nunivak Wilderness

== Demographics ==
Historical population
Census	Pop.	Note	%±
1960	5,537		—
1970	7,579		36.9%
1980	10,999		45.1%
1990	13,656		24.2%
2000	16,006		17.2%
2010	17,013		6.3%
2020	18,666		9.7%
2025 (est.)	18,391	▼	−1.5%
U.S. Decennial Census; 1790-1960 1900-1990; 1990-2000 2010-2020

=== 2020 census ===
Bethel Census Area, Alaska – Racial and ethnic composition Note: the US Census treats Hispanic/Latino as an ethnic category. This table excludes Latinos from the racial categories and assigns them to a separate category. Hispanics/Latinos may be of any race.
Race / Ethnicity (NH = Non-Hispanic)	Pop 1980	Pop 1990	Pop 2000	Pop 2010	Pop 2020	% 1980	% 1990	% 2000	% 2010	% 2020
White alone (NH)	1,636	2,074	1,958	1,854	1,628	14.87%	15.19%	12.23%	10.90%	8.72%
Black or African American alone (NH)	26	62	59	65	84	0.24%	0.45%	0.37%	0.38%	0.45%
Native American or Alaska Native alone (NH)	9,247	11,339	13,063	14,056	15,580	84.07%	83.03%	81.61%	82.62%	83.47%
Asian alone (NH)	29	90	168	158	201	0.26%	0.66%	1.05%	0.93%	1.08%
Native Hawaiian or Pacific Islander alone (NH)	x	x	9	18	2	x	x	0.06%	0.11%	0.01%
Other race alone (NH)	0	11	5	6	19	0.00%	0.08%	0.03%	0.04%	0.10%
Mixed race or Multiracial (NH)	x	x	604	675	945	x	x	3.77%	3.97%	5.06%
Hispanic or Latino (any race)	61	80	140	181	207	0.55%	0.59%	0.87%	1.06%	1.11%
Total	10,999	13,656	16,006	17,013	18,666	100.00%	100.00%	100.00%	100.00%	100.00%

As of the 2020 census, the county had a population of 18,666. The median age was 27.6 years. 35.0% of residents were under the age of 18 and 8.2% of residents were 65 years of age or older. For every 100 females there were 109.3 males, and for every 100 females age 18 and over there were 111.4 males.

The racial makeup of the county was 8.9% White, 0.5% Black or African American, 83.7% American Indian and Alaska Native, 1.1% Asian, 0.0% Native Hawaiian and Pacific Islander, 0.3% from some other race, and 5.4% from two or more races. Hispanic or Latino residents of any race comprised 1.1% of the population.

27.3% of residents lived in urban areas, while 72.7% lived in rural areas.

There were 4,897 households in the county, of which 53.2% had children under the age of 18 living with them and 24.0% had a female householder with no spouse or partner present. About 20.1% of all households were made up of individuals and 4.9% had someone living alone who was 65 years of age or older.

There were 5,984 housing units, of which 18.2% were vacant. Among occupied housing units, 60.9% were owner-occupied and 39.1% were renter-occupied. The homeowner vacancy rate was 0.3% and the rental vacancy rate was 6.5%.

=== 2000 census ===
As of the census of 2000, there were 16,006 people, 4,226 households, and 3,173 families living in the census area. The population density was 0 people per square mile (0 people/km^{2}). There were 5,188 housing units at an average density of 0 per square mile (0/km^{2}). The racial makeup of the census area was 12.53% White, 0.38% Black or African American, 81.93% Native American, 1.05% Asian, 0.06% Pacific Islander, 0.19% from other races, and 3.85% from two or more races. 0.87% of the population were Hispanic or Latino of any race. Of the 4,226 households, 51.00% had children under the age of 18 living with them, 50.20% were married couples living together, 15.20% had a female householder with no husband present, and 24.90% were non-families. 19.90% of households were one person, and 2.80% were one person aged 65 or older. The average household size was 3.73 and the average family size was 4.41.

In the census area the population was spread out, with 39.80% under the age of 18, 9.70% from 18 to 24, 28.90% from 25 to 44, 16.40% from 45 to 64, and 5.20% 65 or older. The median age was 25 years. For every 100 females, there were 113.20 males. For every 100 females age 18 and over, there were 112.80 males.

=== Languages ===
Bethel Census Area is one of only 38 county-level census divisions of the United States where the most spoken language is not English and one of only 4 where it is neither English nor Spanish. 63.14% of the population speak a Yupik language at home, followed by English at 34.71%.

== Politics ==
United States presidential election results for Bethel Census Area, Alaska
Year	Republican		Democratic		Third party(ies)	
Year	No.	%	No.	%	No.	%
1960	785	67.27%	382	32.73%	0	0.00%
1964	257	13.48%	1,649	86.52%	0	0.00%
1968	939	39.29%	1,293	54.10%	158	6.61%
1972	1,033	40.57%	1,426	56.01%	87	3.42%
1976	1,344	46.89%	1,410	49.20%	112	3.91%
1980	860	25.41%	2,068	61.09%	457	13.50%
1984	2,402	51.49%	2,104	45.10%	159	3.41%
1988	1,951	51.79%	1,669	44.31%	147	3.90%
1992	1,844	40.10%	1,840	40.01%	915	19.90%
1996	1,467	30.39%	2,790	57.80%	570	11.81%
2000	2,025	42.10%	2,232	46.40%	553	11.50%
2004	1,935	49.01%	1,832	46.40%	181	4.58%
2008	2,250	43.50%	2,695	52.10%	228	4.41%
2012	1,150	23.90%	3,425	71.19%	236	4.91%
2016	1,103	22.31%	2,719	55.00%	1,122	22.69%
2020	1,670	32.70%	3,085	60.41%	352	6.89%
2024	1,622	37.99%	2,181	51.09%	466	10.92%

Like most counties or equivalents with a Native American majority, Bethel tends to support Democratic presidential candidates. However, Republican Senator Lisa Murkowski, who has fared well with Alaska Native voters, carried the census area overwhelmingly in 2022. Republicans Mike Dunleavy and Sean Parnell also won its vote for governorship in 2022 and 2010.

== Communities ==
=== Cities ===
- Akiak
- Aniak
- Bethel
- Chefornak
- Chuathbaluk
- Eek
- Goodnews Bay
- Kwethluk
- Lower Kalskag
- Mekoryuk
- Napakiak
- Napaskiak
- Nightmute
- Nunapitchuk
- Platinum
- Quinhagak
- Toksook Bay
- Upper Kalskag

=== Census-designated places ===
- Akiachak
- Atmautluak
- Crooked Creek
- Kasigluk
- Kipnuk
- Kongiganak
- Kwigillingok
- Lime Village
- Mertarvik
- Newtok
- Oscarville
- Red Devil
- Sleetmute
- Stony River
- Tuluksak
- Tuntutuliak
- Tununak

=== Unincorporated communities ===
- Crow Village
- Georgetown
- Napaimute
- Umkumiute

== Education ==
School districts include:

- Iditarod Area School District
- Kuspuk School District
- Lower Kuskokwim School District
- Lower Yukon School District
- Yupiit School District

== Transportation ==
Bethel has Bethel Airport and Bethel Seaplane Base.

== See also ==
- Nunathloogagamiutbingoi Dunes
