= Upper Kalskag, Alaska =

- City
- Location in Alaska
- Coordinates: 61°32′15″N 160°18′58″W
- Country: United States
- State: Alaska
- Census Area: Bethel
- Incorporated: February 13, 1975

Government
  - Mayor: John Evan
  - State senator: Lyman Hoffman (D)
  - State rep.: Bryce Edgmon (I)

Area
  - Total: 4.00 sq mi (10.36 km^{2})
  - Land: 3.56 sq mi (9.21 km^{2})
  - Water: 0.44 sq mi (1.15 km^{2})
- Elevation: 39 ft (12 m)

Population (2020)
  - Total: 212
  - Density: 59.6/sq mi (23.02/km^{2})
- Time zone: UTC-9 (Alaska (AKST))
  - Summer (DST): UTC-8 (AKDT)
- ZIP code: 99607
- Area code: 907
- FIPS code: 02-81320
- GNIS feature ID: 1404378

Upper Kalskag (Russian: Аппер-Калскаг) is a city in Bethel Census Area, Alaska, United States. It is thirty miles west of Aniak. As of the 2020 census, Upper Kalskag had a population of 212.

== Culture and history ==
Upper Kalskag is a traditional Yup'ik village, with a culture centered on subsistence activities. The founding residents were from the native village of Kaltkhagamute, four miles down river. The Russian explorer Lavrenty Zagoskin reported a population of 120 in 1843 for Kaltkhagamute (Khalkagmute). Over the years, residents of Crow Village, Ohagamiut, Russian Mission, and Paimute also moved to the village. Russian and American explorers brought both Roman Catholic and Russian Orthodox religious influences, but the village's Russian Orthodox practitioners left to establish Lower Kalskag 2 miles downriver in 1940. George Morgan, a German immigrant who founded Georgetown, established a general store and post office in 1932. Paul N. Kameroff Sr. also established a general store, a pool hall, and a coffee shop around 1930. The government school was built in that timeframe as well. The community once owned a herd of about 2000 caribou.

== Geography ==
Upper Kalskag is located at 61°32′15″N 160°18′58″W (61.537440, -160.316070).

According to the United States Census Bureau, the city has a total area of 4.1 square miles (11 km^{2}), of which, 3.8 square miles (9.8 km^{2}) of it is land and 0.3 square miles (0.78 km^{2}) of it (8.47%) is water.

Upper Kalskag, referred to by the locals as just "Upper", is linked to Lower Kalskag (Lower) by a single two mile maintained gravel/dirt road.

Upper Kalskag is accessible only by small plane, boat, and automobile via the river "ice road" (Winter only). The ice road is constructed each winter from Crooked Creek to Bethel by drilling and marking holes in the ice every 100 yards and subsequently marking and plowing a route on the river where the ice depth is sufficient.

== Demographics ==
Historical population
Census	Pop.	Note	%±
1940	70		—
1950	139		98.6%
1960	147		5.8%
1970	122		−17.0%
1980	129		5.7%
1990	172		33.3%
2000	230		33.7%
2010	210		−8.7%
2020	212		1.0%
U.S. Decennial Census

Upper Kalskag first reported on the 1940 U.S. Census erroneously as the unincorporated village of "Old Kalskag." The population was 70 instead of 76, while the population accredited to Upper Kalskag (then called "Kalskag") was actually for Lower Kalskag. It would continue to report as Kalskag on the census until it formally incorporate as Upper Kalskag in 1975.

=== 2020 census ===
As of the 2020 census, Upper Kalskag had a population of 212. The median age was 29.7 years. 34.0% of residents were under the age of 18 and 6.1% of residents were 65 years of age or older. For every 100 females there were 91.0 males, and for every 100 females age 18 and over there were 100.0 males age 18 and over.

0.0% of residents lived in urban areas, while 100.0% lived in rural areas.

There were 59 households in Upper Kalskag, of which 57.6% had children under the age of 18 living in them. Of all households, 37.3% were married-couple households, 16.9% were households with a male householder and no spouse or partner present, and 28.8% were households with a female householder and no spouse or partner present. About 18.7% of all households were made up of individuals and 6.8% had someone living alone who was 65 years of age or older.

There were 89 housing units, of which 33.7% were vacant. The homeowner vacancy rate was 0.0% and the rental vacancy rate was 5.3%.

Racial composition as of the 2020 census
Race	Number	Percent
White	15	7.1%
Black or African American	0	0.0%
American Indian and Alaska Native	182	85.8%
Asian	0	0.0%
Native Hawaiian and Other Pacific Islander	0	0.0%
Some other race	0	0.0%
Two or more races	15	7.1%
Hispanic or Latino (of any race)	1	0.5%

=== 2000 census ===
As of the census of 2000, there were 230 people, 62 households, and 44 families residing in the city. The population density was 60.8 inhabitants per square mile (23.5/km^{2}). There were 66 housing units at an average density of 17.5 units per square mile (6.8 units/km^{2}). The racial makeup of the city was 8.70% White, 0.43% Black or African American, 85.65% Native American, and 5.22% from two or more races.

There were 62 households, out of which 56.5% had children under the age of 18 living with them, 37.1% were married couples living together, 16.1% had a female householder with no husband present, and 29.0% were non-families. 24.2% of all households were made up of individuals, and 6.5% had someone living alone who was 65 years of age or older. The average household size was 3.71 and the average family size was 4.55.

In the city, the population was spread out, with 43.9% under the age of 18, 10.4% from 18 to 24, 27.0% from 25 to 44, 12.6% from 45 to 64, and 6.1% who were 65 years of age or older. The median age was 22 years. For every 100 females, there were 103.5 males. For every 100 females age 18 and over, there were 111.5 males.

The median income for a household in the city was $28,333, and the median income for a family was $32,708. Males had a median income of $16,667 versus $20,938 for females. The per capita income for the city was $7,859. About 24.5% of families and 24.2% of the population were below the poverty line, including 28.4% of those under the age of eighteen and 5.3% of those 65 or over.
