= Napaimute, Alaska =

Unincorporated community in the state of Alaska, United States

Napaimute
- Unincorporated community
- Location within the state of Alaska
- Coordinates: 61°27′43″N 158°38′21″W
- Country: United States
- State: Alaska
- Census area: Bethel

Government
  - State senator: Lyman Hoffman (D)
  - State rep.: Zach Fansler (D)

Population (2010)
  - Total: 2
- Time zone: UTC-9 (Alaska (AKST))
  - Summer (DST): UTC-8 (AKDT)
- GNIS feature ID: 2418727

Napaimute (Central Yupik: Napamiut) is an unincorporated Alaska Native village located in the Bethel Census Area of the U.S. state of Alaska. It is classified as an Alaskan Native Village Statistical Area. As of the 2010 U.S. Census, it has a population of 2. This is up from a population of zero in 2000.

== History ==
Englishman George Hoffman established a trading post at the location of present-day Napaimute in 1906. The village that formed around the trading post was called Hoffman's. The middle Kuskokwim Valley was seeing and influx of gold prospectors at that time and Hoffman's became an important supply and trade center. George Hoffman would soon relocated to Georgetown, and the name of the village was changed to Napaimute. In Yup'ik language, the word Napaimute translates to "forest people". The first territorial school along the Kuskokwim River was built in 1920 at Napaimute. By 1930, the US census was reporting a Napaimute population of 111, however, the population then began to decline, and by 1969, the village's last permanent resident had left the village. With the passage of the Alaska Native Claims Settlement Act in 1971, a village corporation called Napaimute Limited was formed and in 1975, one of its members established permanent residency at the village. the village council was able to receive federal recognition as an Alaska Native Tribe in 1994, which enabled it to start receiving funding from the Bureau of Indian Affairs. Current efforts to revitalize the community are evident by the set up of a sawmill in 2001, tribal operations in 2002, and an airport feasibility study launched in 2004.

== Geography ==
Georgetown is located at 61°32′N 158°40′W on the north bank of the upper Kuskokwim River 28 miles east of Aniak in the Kilbuck-Kuskokwim mountains. Napaimute is accessible by boat, or snowmobile (winter).

== Demographics ==
Historical population
Census	Pop.	Note	%±
1880	60		—
1890	23		−61.7%
1930	111		—
1940	75		−32.4%
1950	44		−41.3%
1980	4		—
1990	3		−25.0%
2000	0		−100.0%
2010	2		—
U.S. Decennial Census

Napaimute first appeared on the 1880 U.S. Census as an unincorporated Tinneh village of 60 residents (all Tinneh). In 1890, it returned as "Napaimiut" (all 23 residents were Native). It did not return again until 1930, this time as "Napaimut." In 1940, it returned as "Napamiute." In 1950, it returned under its 1890 census name, "Napaimiut." It did not return again until 1980, when it returned as its original 1880 name and spelling, Napaimute. It was classified as an unincorporated Alaskan Native Village Statistical Area (ANVSA) in each successive census.
