= Ohagamiut, Alaska =

Coordinates: 61.537196417932485°N 160.19766944016726°W

Ohagamiut (Central Yupik: Urr’agmiut) is an abandoned village along the Kuskokwim River in the Bethel Census Area of the southwestern part of the U.S. state of Alaska, located between Crow Village and Kalskag. It was abandoned in the 1940s as residents relocated to Kalskag, Aniak, Bethel and other towns. The village site is located just 3 miles east of Upper Kalskag.

Ohagamiut is sometimes confused with another Yup'ik village on the Yukon River called Ohogamiut, which is presently an Alaska Native Village Statistical Area (ANVSA).

== History ==
Ohagamiut has also been called Okhogamute. The first reference to the village comes from Russian explorers who traveled down the Kuskokwim River in 1818. The first Roman Catholic mission in western Alaska was established at Ohagamiut in 1892. The first census of Alaska completed in 1884 by Ivan Petrof showed Okhogamute having a population of 130.

== Demographics ==
Historical population
Census	Pop.	Note	%±
1880	130		—
1890	36		−72.3%
1920	92		—
U.S. Decennial Census

Ohagamiut first reported on the 1880 United States census as the unincorporated Yup'ik village of "Okhogamute", with 130 residents (127 Inuit and 3 Creole (Mixed Russian and Native)). It returned in 1890 as "Oh-hagamiut", with 36 residents (all Native). It last appeared on the 1920 census as "Ohagamute", with 92 residents. Although it never appeared on the census again, it would later appear on maps as "Oknagamut."
