= Kwigiumpainukamiut, Alaska =

Ghost town in Alaska

Coordinates: 61.5686°N 159.2258°W

Kwigiumpainukamiut is a ghost town in Bethel Census Area, Alaska, United States, located between Chuathbaluk and Napaimute, directly across the river from Kolmakoff Island. It is a clearing about 200 yards (200 m) long. In the early spring, it is covered with tan-colored grass and is easier to see.
