= Mukluk =

Soft boot worn by Arctic peoples

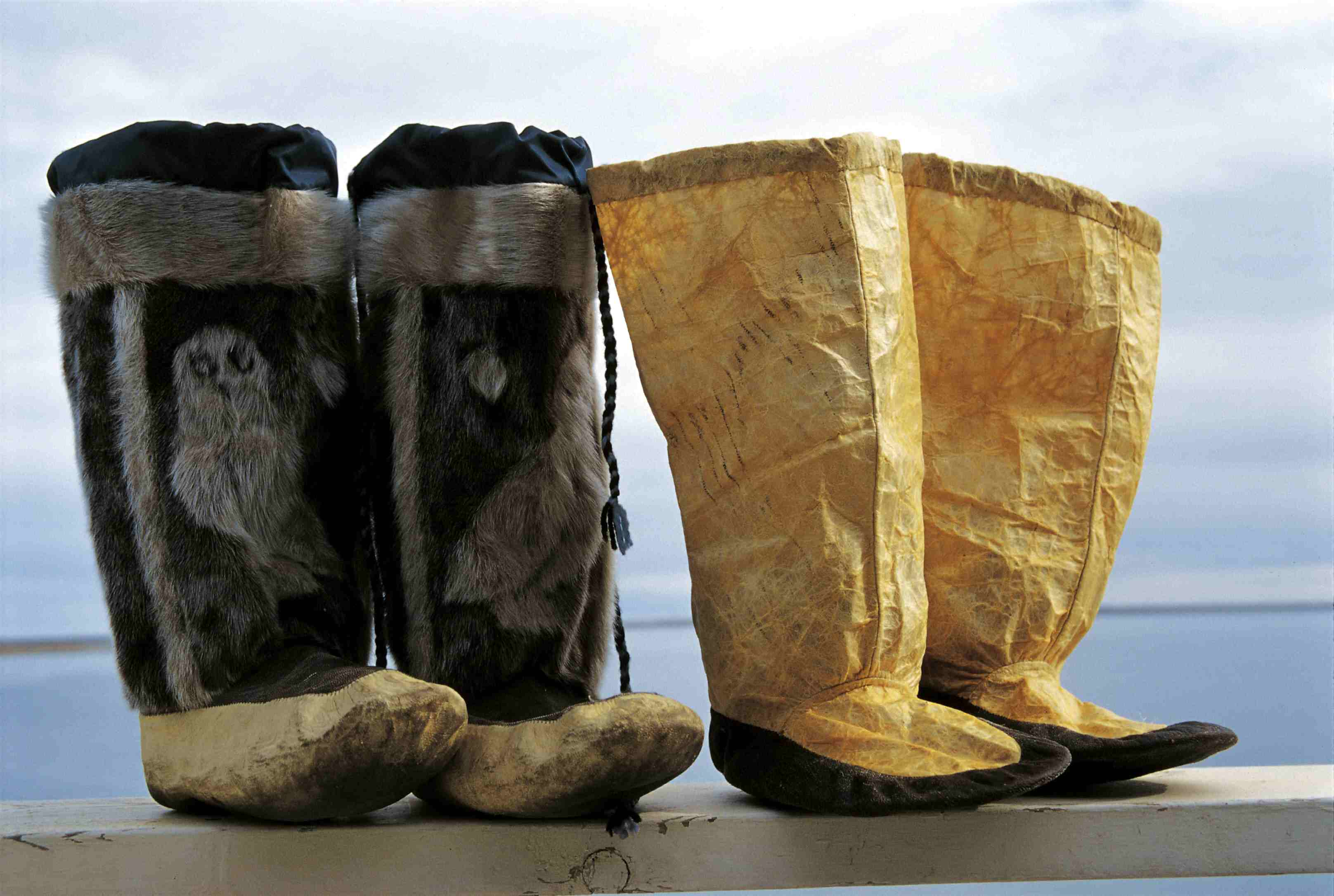
Two pair of sealskin kamiit. Left, winter kamik, right, summer kamik.

Mukluks or kamik (Inuktitut: ᑲᒥᒃ [kaˈmik]) (singular: ᑲᒪᒃ kamak, plural: ᑲᒦᑦ kamiit) are soft boots, traditionally made of reindeer (caribou) skin or sealskin, and worn by Indigenous Arctic peoples, including Inuit, Iñupiat, and Yup'ik.

Mukluks may be worn over an inner boot liner and under a protective overshoe. The term mukluk is often used for any soft boot designed for cold weather, and modern designs may use both traditional and modern materials. The word mukluk is of Yup'ik origin, from maklak, the bearded seal, while kamik is an Inuit word.

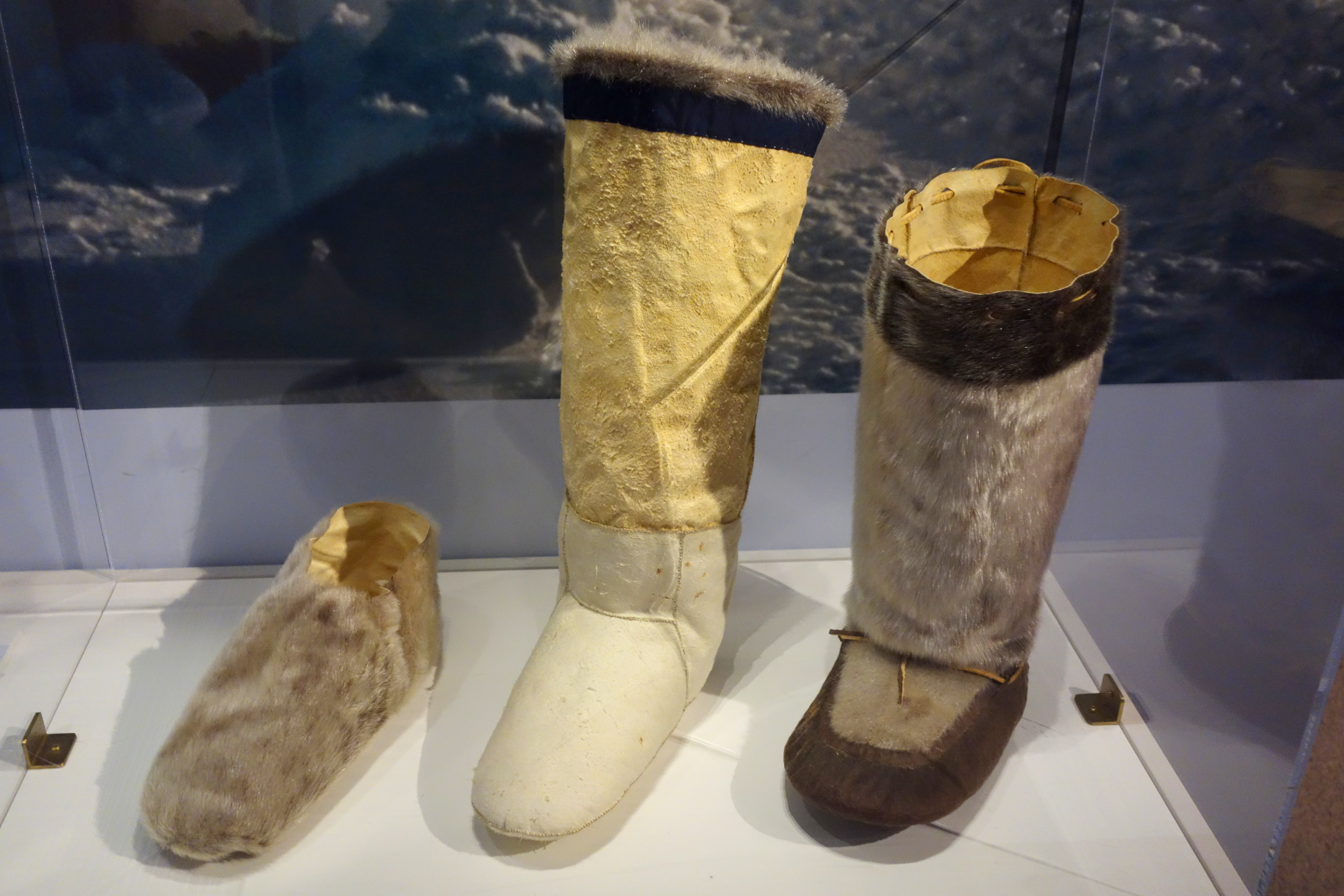
Three-layer winter footwear system. Left to right, short inner slipper, inner (fur inwards), outer (fur outwards).

== Related boots ==
Soft-soled boots, of similar materials (mostly sealskin and caribou-skin) and designs, but with local variations, are traditionally worn in the Arctic and subarctic areas. These include the North American Arctic, including Greenland, the European Arctic, including Fennoscandia, and Siberia.

Another type of boot, sometimes called an Inuit boot, originating in Greenland and the eastern part of Alaska, is made by binding it with animal sinew, and has a centre seam running down to the foot of the boot.

Another type has a soft leather sole, but the upper is knitted out of wool or a wool-rayon blend. Often called "slipper socks", these are traditionally worn by the people of the Hindu Kush mountains.

== Use ==
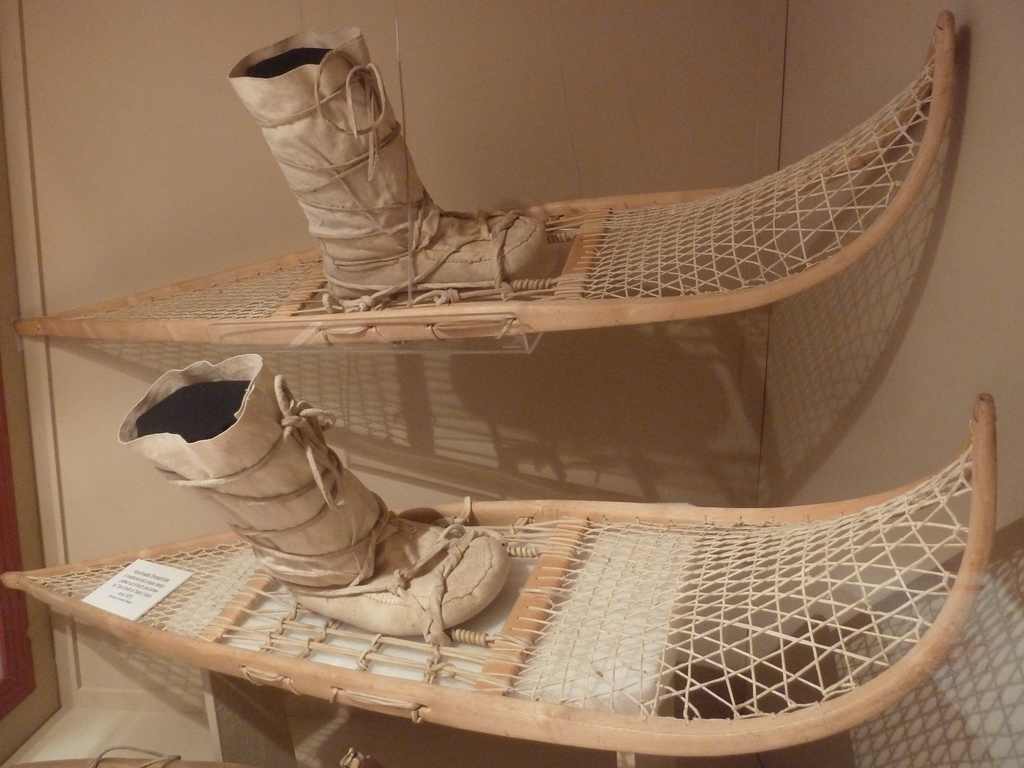
Use with snowshoes

As mukluks are soft-soled, and flex with the feet, they allow hunters to move very quietly. A wearer can run, tip-toe, and even dance in mukluks. They are also designed for use in the tundra.

Mukluks weigh little. While, for instance, the United States Marines extreme-cold-weather boots weigh 3.6 kg (8 lb), soft-soled boots made using modern materials weigh less than a tenth of that. Lighter shoes also allow for more efficient running.

== Care ==
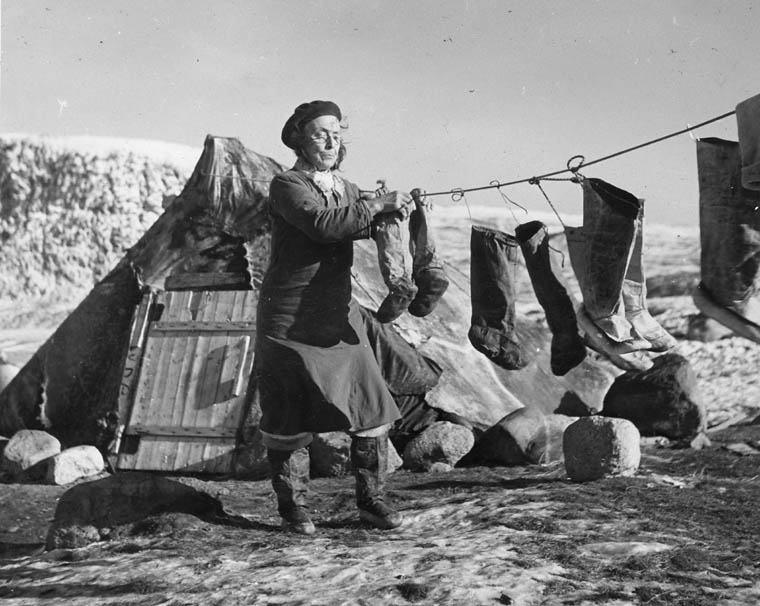
Drying summer kamiit, Pangnirtung, Northwest Territories, 1951

Fur garments, including kamiks, are in the modern day stored in an unheated annexe. In a home with forced-air heating, the interior air is warm and very dry. The warmth and dryness would cause the furs to deteriorate quickly. On sunny days they are aired outside, especially in spring. After a season's storage, traditional skin kamiks tend to stiffen and need to be worked and stretched to make them pliable again.

Allowing traditional boots to dry between uses hinders rot, letting the boots last longer. Multiple pairs can be worn in rotation to allow them more time to dry.

== Design ==
Because mukluks weigh little, there is no need for heavy lacing; friction is enough to hold them on the foot. Some mukluks are very lightly laced (through external loops sewn into the seams, so as not to leak). They may be laced over the arch of the foot, or around the top of the boot to stiffen it. Many, however, are designed without lacing, to avoid constricting the circulation and making the foot cold. The top of the boot stands up somewhat stiffly, and may be open at the top, which allows moisture to escape.

Mukluks are often made with a wrapped sole, so that the seam around the sole is on the top and sides of the boot, not on the bottom edge. This helps avoid leaks, and wear and tear on the seams.

As with many Inuit clothing and worn items, the grain direction of the skins used in kamiks are critical for their proper function. According to Deborah Qaunaq, improper placement of harp seal skin soles with the fur grain towards the heel direction causes kamiks to become quite slippery even with moderate wear, and is a common mistake. Aligning the skin with the seal's flipper end facing the kamik toes (seal rostral-caudal aligned to foot proximal-distal) prevents slip and ensures the kamik's utility.

Kamiks made for cold, dry winter weather may have fur low down on the outside, and other features that would be a problem when not on dry, powdery snow. Kamiks for warm, slushy, muddy, or open-ocean conditions are finely stitched from waterproof sealskin (see illustration above).

The short overshoes may also be made waterproof for wet conditions, or furry with more grip for dry terrain. The inner boots are often made with the fur facing inwards. They are worn without socks, because socks absorb and hold sweat.

Mukluks may be adorned with pom-poms, beads, embroidery, and other techniques.

The design of the mukluk is used for the industrial manufacture of some other cold-weather boots, especially paired with a rugged contemporary sole. The key component of the overall success of the mukluk design is its ability to breathe, that is, to allow air exchange. This is an advantage in extremely cold conditions where perspiration may become a factor in frostbite on one's feet. Their bulkiness, paired with their poor performance in slush (they keep snow out, but water quickly soaks through), makes them less ideal for the casual winter wearer.

== Manufacture ==
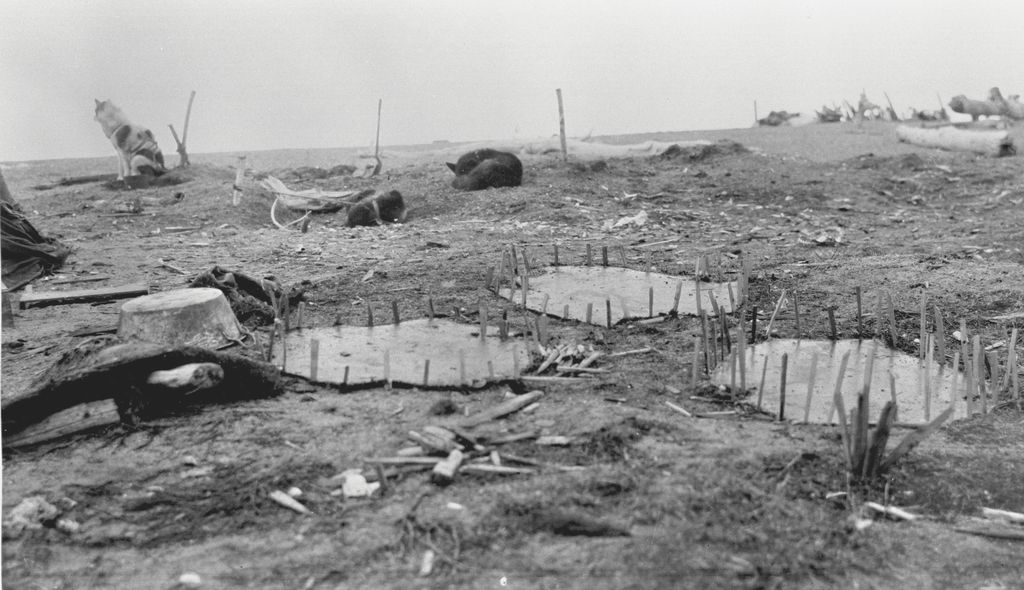
Drying sealskins, near Barter Island, Alaska, June 1914

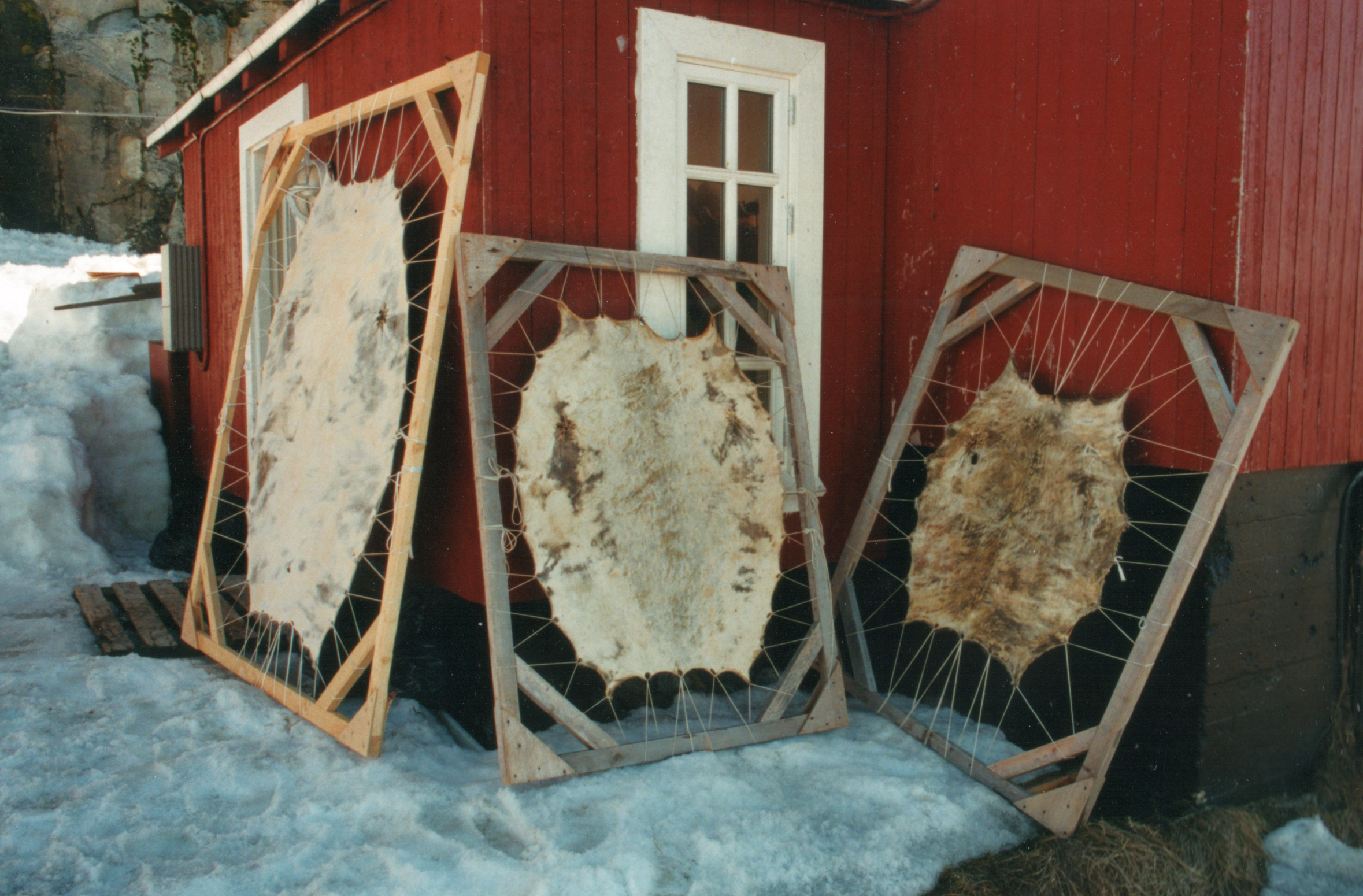
Greenland, 1999

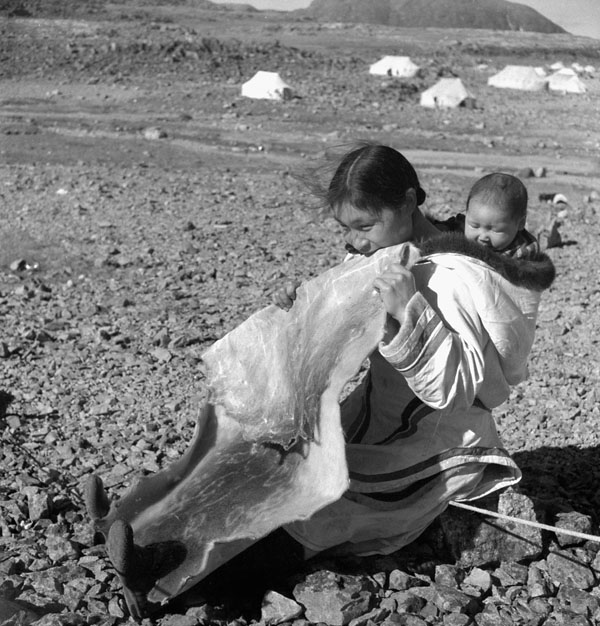
Chewing sealskin to soften it; Cape Dorset, Northwest Territories, July 1951

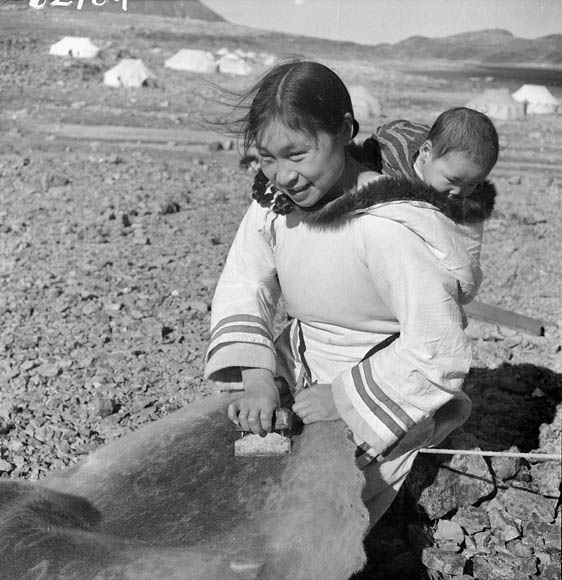
A scraper may also be used.

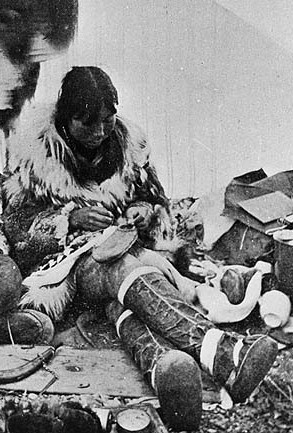
Making waterproof summer overshoes in a tent, c. 1900, Port Clarence, Alaska

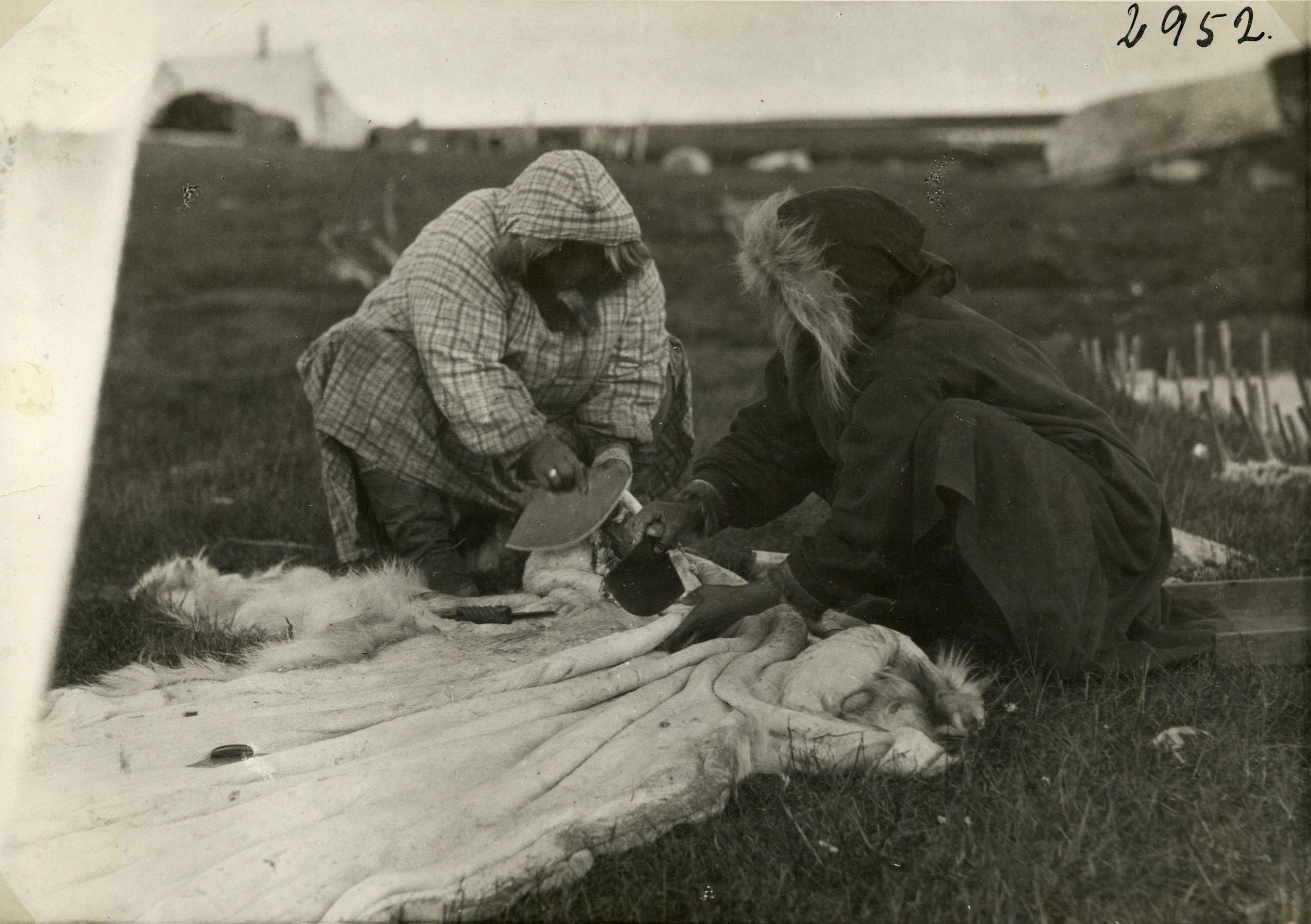
Scraping caribou skin, Alaska, 1922

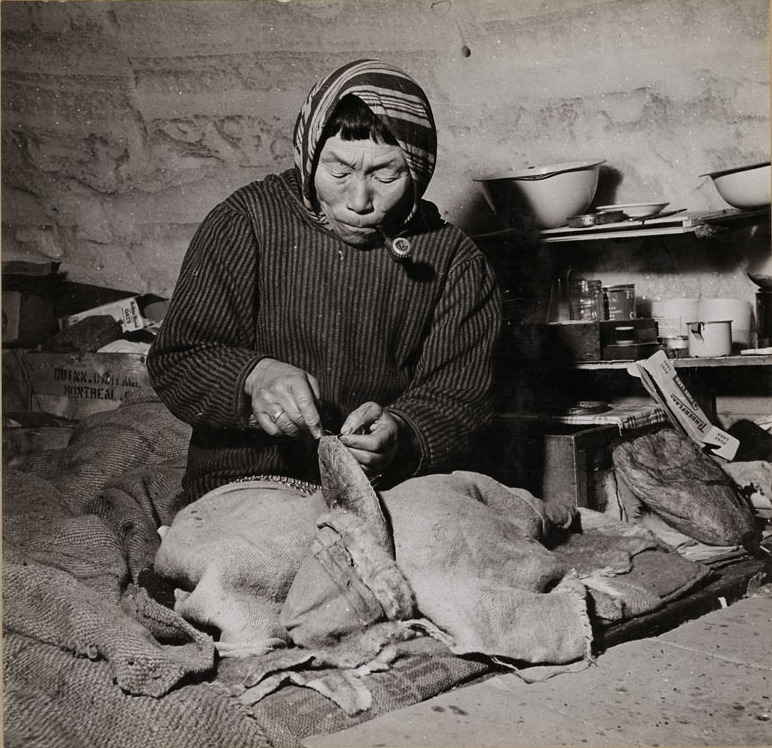
An Inuk making kamiit from sealskin, in an igloo in Port Harrison, Quebec, Canada, January 1946

Usually, the uppers of summer kamik are made from ringed seal skin, while the soles are made of bearded seal skin, which is tougher. Winter kamik are often made of caribou leg fur; caribou, unlike seals, rely on fur rather than blubber for insulation, so their fur is warmer.

The skin requires laborious preparation. Seals must be skinned, and the skins blubbered, washed in dish soap, scraped to clean them, hung to drain, and then stretched to dry outside. The skins may be bleached in the sun, and for summer kamik, they are generally scraped clean of fur to allow watertight stitching. Blind-stitching (not piercing the full depth of the skin) with sinew, which shrinks when wet, helps keep mukluks watertight. Commercial boots of modern materials will often require seam-sealing after purchase if they are to be fully waterproof.

For insulation, mukluks may be lined with furs such as caribou, Arctic hare, Arctic fox and more modern imports such as raccoon or rabbit. Commercial sheepskin may be used to line and sole boots, as of the first decade of the 20th century. Down, polyester, and closed-celled EVA foam is also used in soft-soled boots. The inner boot may also be made of textile, or wool felt.

== Gallery ==
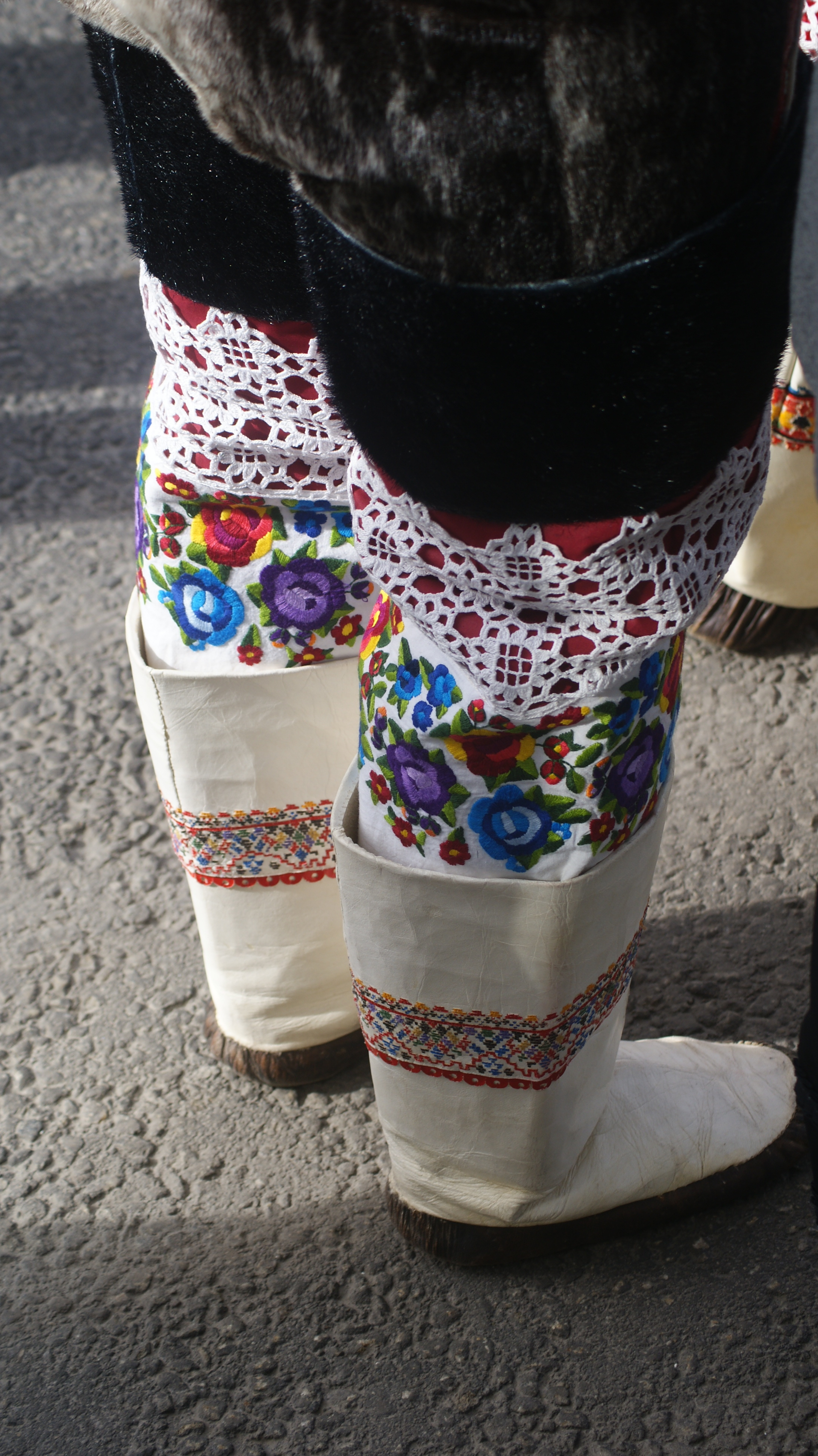
Ceremonial kamik boots worn by women in Greenland during special occasions. Shorter sealskin outer boots are worn over decorated textile thigh-high inners. Sisimiut, Greenland

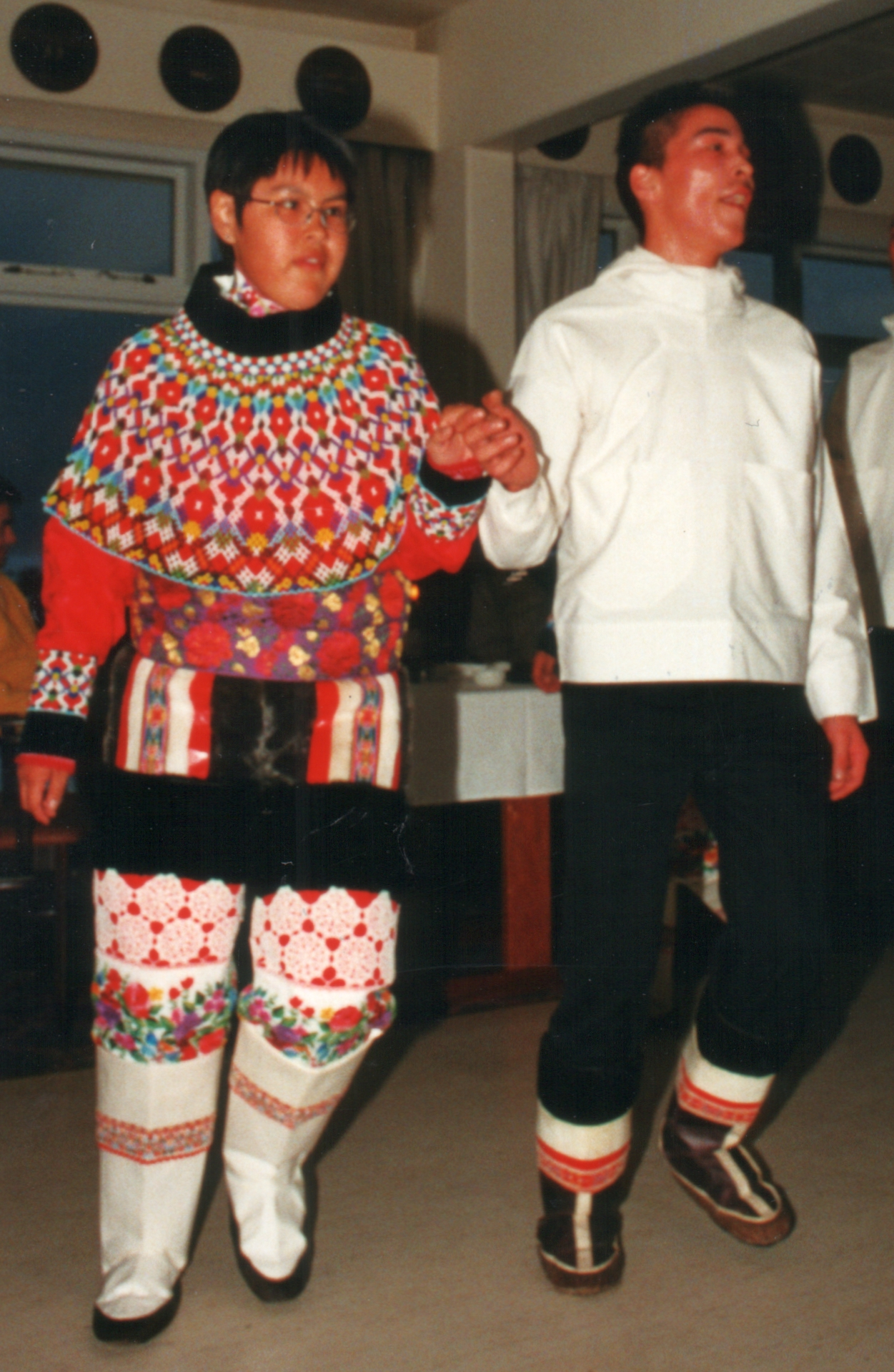
Dancing in ceremonial kamiit in Ilulissat, Greenland in 1999. Note flexibility and lack of lacing.

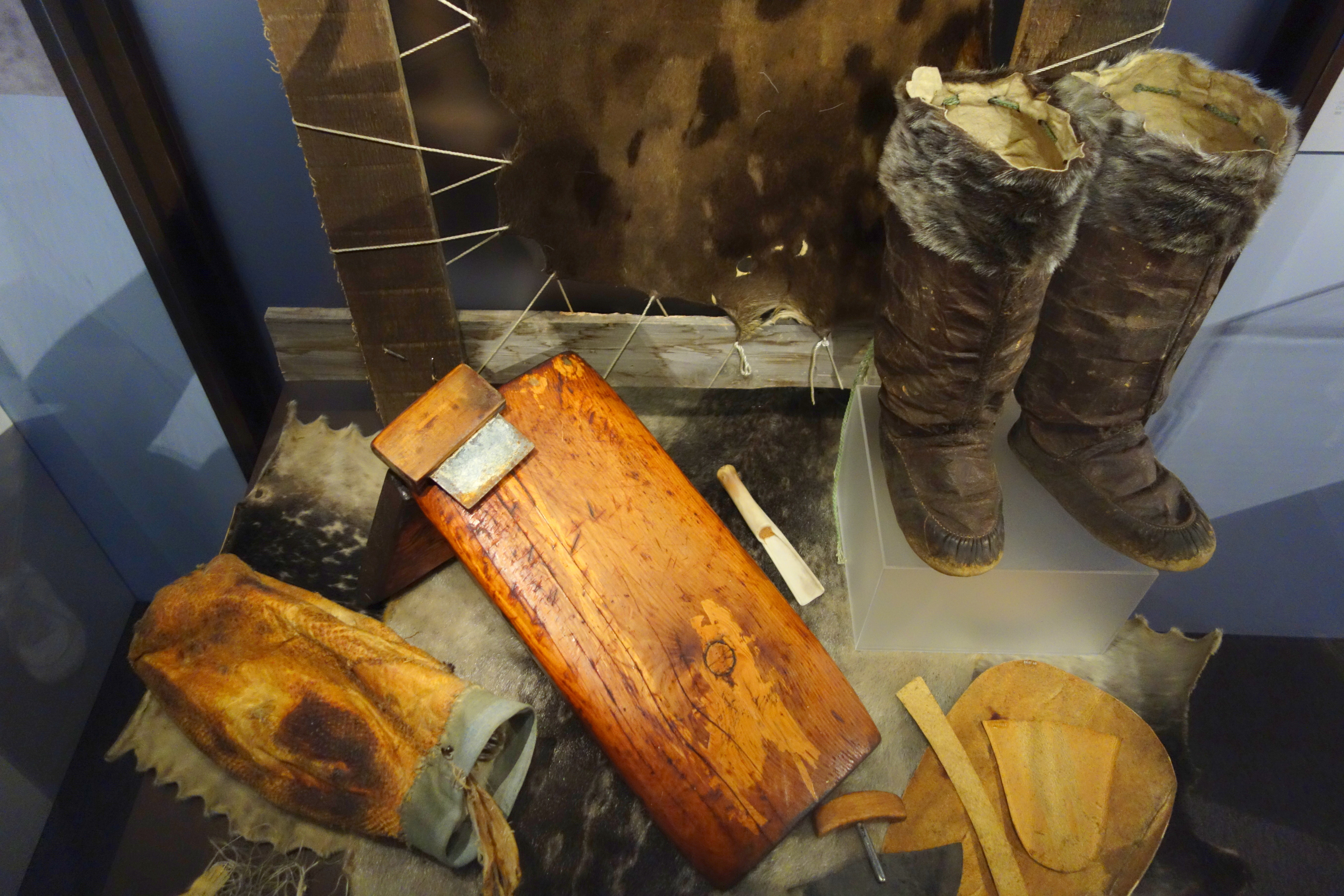
Top right, kamik for wet conditions, from Ungava, 1989. Note wrap-around sole, seam location, and lack of laces (close-up). Left, the tools for making them. Lower right, cut-out pieces for sole and vamp.

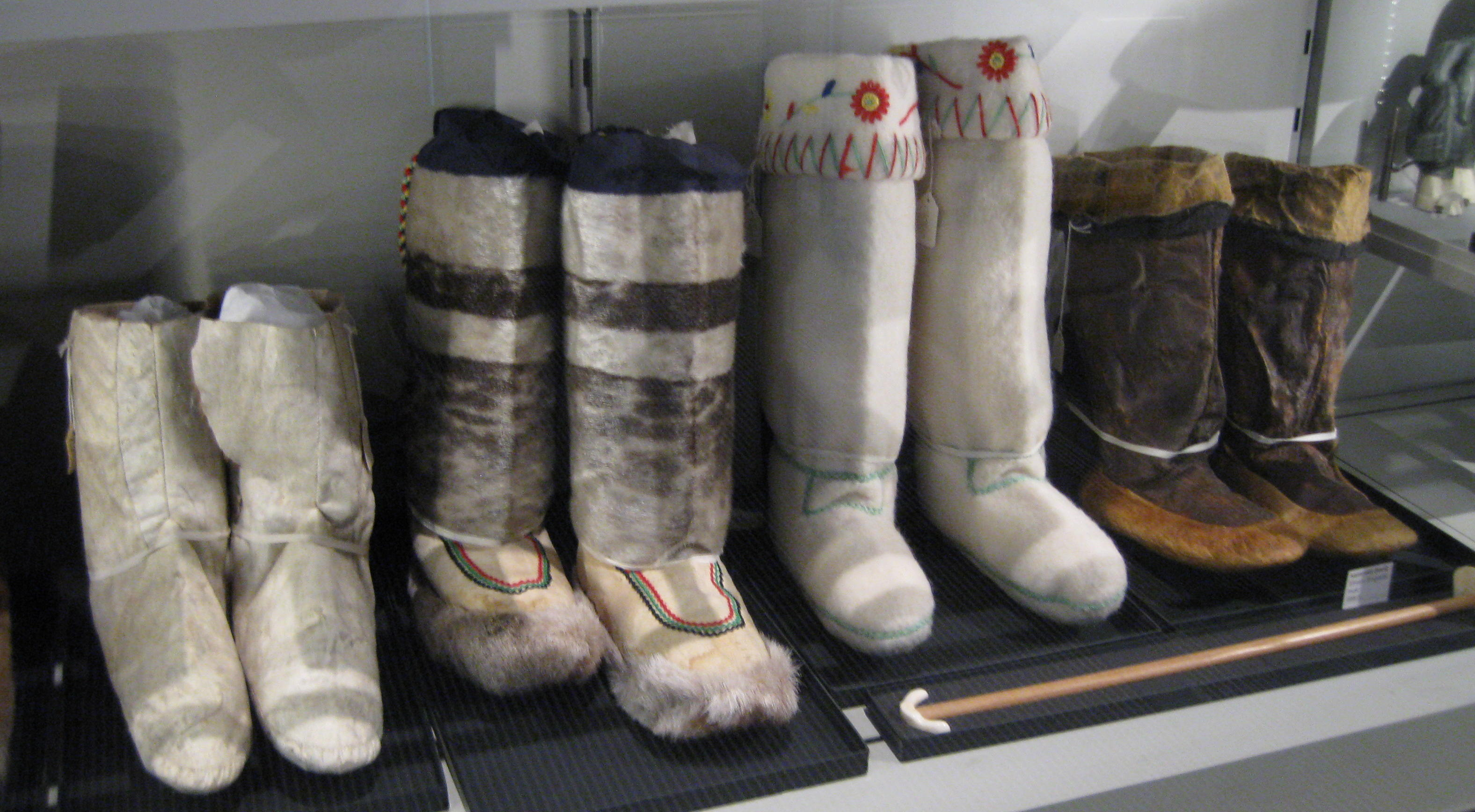
Kamiit, winter and summer, with their inners removed and stood separately. The exposed parts of the (felt) winter liner are decorated.

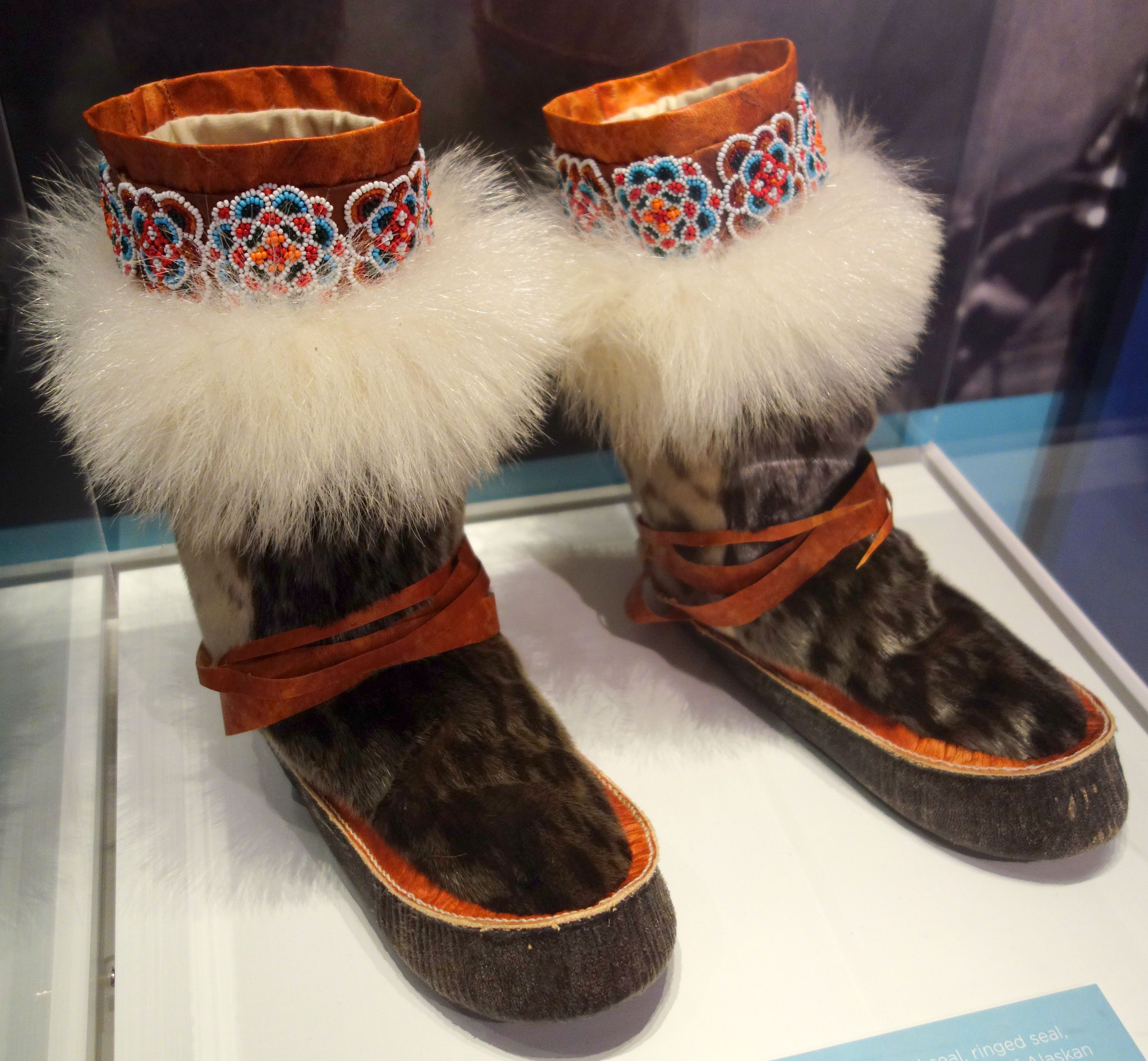
Alaskan boots, Inupiat, 1989, bearded seal, ringed seal, spotted seal, caribou, polar bear

Crow Village Sam wearing his favorite mukluks, Chuathbaluk, Alaskaca, 1970

== See also ==
- Inuit clothing#Footwear
- Ugg boots
- Yupʼik clothing
- List of boots
- List of shoe styles
