= Zagoskin =

Zagoskin is a surname of Russian origin. Notable people with the surname include:

- Lavrenty Zagoskin (1808–1890), Russian naval officer and explorer
- Mikhail Zagoskin (1789–1852), Russian writer
