= Kuspuk School District =

School district in Alaska, United States

Address
- 100 Boundary Avenue Aniak, Alaska, 99557; United States

District information
- Type: Public
- Grades: Pre-K–12
- NCES District ID: 0200760

Students and staff
- Students: 309
- Teachers: 30.8
- Staff: 57.62
- Student–teacher ratio: 10.03

Other information
- Website: www.kuspuk.org

Kuspuk School District is a school district headquartered in Aniak, Alaska.

In 2024 the enrollment count was 318. The district's area is similar in size to that of Maryland.

== History ==
On July 1, 2020, James Anderson began his term as superintendent.

By 2024, over 50% of the teachers were from the Philippines, hired on J-1 visas.

== Schools ==
Secondary schools (grades 6–12)

- Aniak Junior Senior High School (Aniak)
- George Morgan Sr. High School (Upper Kalskag)

Elementary schools

- Joseph & Olinga Gregory Elementary School (Kalskag) (grades PK-2)
- Zackar Levi Elementary School (Lower Kalskag) (grades 3–5)
- Auntie Mary Nicoli Elementary School (Aniak) (grades PK-5)

Rural schools K-12

- Crow Village Sam School (Chuathbaluk)
- Jack Egnaty Sr. School (Sleetmute)
- Johnnie John Sr. School (Crooked Creek)
- Gusty Michael School (Stony River)
