= Crow Village Sam =

Yup'ik leader from Alaska, c. 1893–1974

"Crow Village" Sam
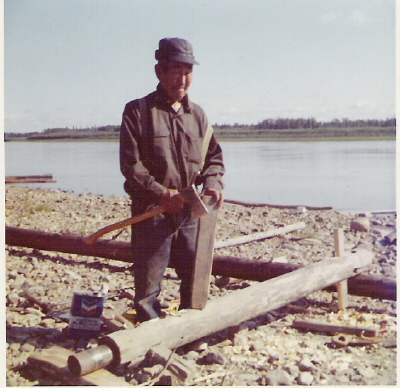
- Sam Phillips, circa 1970
- Born: Sam Phillips c. 1893; Old Crow Village, Alaska, Russia
- Died: 1974 (aged 80–81); Alaska, United States
- Citizenship: Native Village of Chuathbaluk, Russian, American
- Occupations: boat builder, carpenter, community leader, fisherman
- Years active: 1950s–1970s
- Known for: community leader, culture bearer, translator

"Crow Village" Sam Phillips (Yup'ik, c. 1893–1974) was an Alaskan Native leader who lived in the mid-Kuskokwim River valley in Alaska.

== Early life ==
Sam Phillips was born around 1893 in the old Crow Village, Alaska. Birth records in the area were not maintained until 1914, so that date is based on Crow Village Sam's recollection as told to archaeologist Wendell H. Oswalt in 1963.

When Phillips was about 10 years old, he and his community evacuated from Old Crow Village due to shifts in the Kuskokwim River sediment. They settled a half-mile downriver. Their more recent settlement was called New Crow Village. Today, it is simply called Crow Village and the original settlement is referred to as Old Crow Village.

Phillips survived the kanukpuk or "big sickness", an early 20th-century influenza epidemic that wiped out about 50 percent of the population along the Kuskokwim River. Later, he lived in Akiak, and Chuathbaluk.

== Community leadership ==
Sam Phillips wearing his favorite mukluks

By the 1950s, Sam Phillips was recognized as the leader of the Native Yupiit living in the mid-Kuskokwim valley. He was an accomplished boat builder, woodworker, and snowshoe-maker among other things. He was fluent in the English language, which was a great asset in his leadership role.

In 1954, to avoid epidemics, Sam Phillips orchestrated a collective relocation from New Crow Village inhabitants upstream to Chuathbaluk, Alaska. Chuathbaluk was a village located 18 miles upstream from Crow Village that had been abandoned since 1929. Yup'ik people from Aniak and Crooked Creek later joined the Phillips family at Chuathbaluk. The community later became part of the federally recognized Chuathbaluk Traditional Council, part of the Calista Corporation, an Alaska Native Regional Corporation. In the 1950s, Sam Phillips and other men from the community built a new church, St. Sergious Church, at Chuathbaluk to replace the original Russian Orthodox church built between 1897 and 1905.

Sam Phillips still maintained a fish camp at the abandoned Crow Village with a large fish smokehouse. Later he installed a wind-powered generator at Crow Village to supply his radio with electricity. Crow Sam Phillips was an avid subsistence fisher and had the largest fish smokehouse in Chuathbaluk as well.

In 1963, Phillips shared cultural information and traditional oral history of Yup'ik peoples with Wendell H. Oswalt. This project reflected a new approach to archaeology by learning from living oral history.

With the 1971 passage of the Alaska Native Claims Settlement Act, the title to the lands including Crow Village was given to Sam Phillips, since he could fill out the English-language paperwork. His son inherited the land, followed by his grandson David Phillips.

== Personal life ==
Sam Phillips married three times. Each wife, named Lucy, died. He had at least seven children from his first wife. It has been reported by some of his descendants that Sam was of half Russian ancestry.

== Death and legacy ==
Sam Phillips died in 1974 at the age of 81. That was remarkable longevity for a person living in his region during the 20th century. In 1991, the Chuathbaluk grade school built in 1969 was renamed Crow Village Sam School in his honor.
