= List of mayors of Bethel, Alaska =

The following is a list of mayors of the city of Bethel, Alaska, United States.

- Harriet Crocker Jackson, c.1959-1961
- Arthur L. Nicholson, c.1966
- Joseph N. Pike, c.1967
- John Guinn, c.1971, 1982
- Stanley "Tundy" Rodgers, c.2001-2002
- Raymond “Thor” Williams, 2005-2006
- Eric Middlebrook, c.2008
- Tiffany Zulkosky, 2008-2009
- Joseph Klejka, c.2009-2014
- Rick Robb, c.2017-2018
- Michelle DeWitt, 2020-2021
- Mark Springer, c.2021-2022
- Rose "Sugar" Henderson, c.2025-present

== See also ==
- Bethel history
