= Crow Village, Alaska =

Unincorporated community in the state of Alaska, United States

Crow Village
- Unincorporated community
- Location within the state of Alaska
- Coordinates: 61°34′15″N 159°47′00″W
- Country: United States
- State: Alaska
- Census area: Bethel

Government
  - State senator: Lyman Hoffman (D)
  - State rep.: Zach Fansler (D)

Population (2000)
  - Total: 6
- Time zone: UTC-9 (Alaska (AKST))
  - Summer (DST): UTC-8 (AKDT)
- GNIS feature ID: 1894033

Crow Village is an unincorporated community on the Kuskokwim River in the U.S. state of Alaska. There are an estimated six residents.

== Geography ==
Crow Village is located in the Bethel Census Area on the north bank of the Kuskokwim River 6.5 miles (10.5 km) by river west of Aniak, just downstream from where the Crow Village Slough flows back into the Kuskokwim River. Crow Village is 86 miles (138 km) northeast of Bethel.

== Demographics ==
Historical population
Census	Pop.	Note	%±
1880	59		—
1890	17		−71.2%
U.S. Decennial Census

Old Crow Village first appeared on the 1880 U.S. Census as the unincorporated Inuit village of "Toolooka-anahamute" (AKA Tuluka). All 59 residents were listed as Inuit. It returned on the 1890 census as "Tulukagnagamiut." It featured 17 residents, all Native. It did not report on the census again. The original village is referred to today as "Old Crow Village", located 1/2 mile east of the present "new" village. Crow Village is, as of 2010, not a part of any census-designated place or Alaska Native Village Statistical Area (ANVSA), so does not have an official population count. Unverified estimates have stated it to have 5 or 6 residents.

== History ==
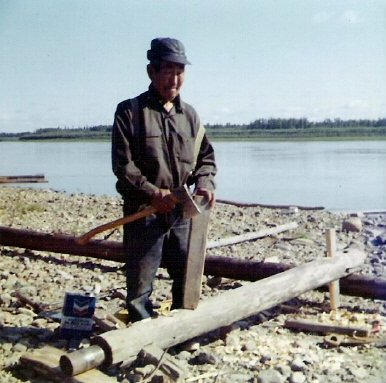
Crow Village Sam circa 1970

Crow Village was originally called Tulukarugmiut (Tulukaghogamiut) by the native Yup'ik population, which roughly translates as "Raven Village People". It is widely believed to be named that after the boisterous raven population native to the nearby bluff. It has also been called Tulukagnag, Toolooka-anahamute, Tuluka and Tulukagangamiut by various explorers and historians; however it is now referred to as Crow Village.

Evidence shows that Kuskokwim Yup'ik (Kuskowagamiut) began migrating inland from the Bering Sea up the Kuskokwim and Yukon Rivers around 500 years ago. The first recorded history of Crow Village was in 1843 by Lt. Lavrenty Zagoskin who was dispatched by the Russian Navy to conduct reconnaissance in the Alaska Interior for potential forts and trading posts. He traveled to the Kuskokwim River traveling by boat to Bristol Bay, then portaging across several rivers and entering the Kuskokwim through the headwaters of the Hoholitna. He described the village at that time as one of the two main villages on the Kuskokwim with a year-round population of approximately 100. This village moved up and down the bank with changes in the river's course and appeared in the 1880 census which was the first census accounting for Alaska population following the Alaska Purchase in 1867. That census was completed by Ivan Petrof and listed Crow Village as Toolooka-anahamute with a population of 59.

Around 1910, Crow Village was moved about 0.5 mile (800 m) downstream due to a change in the river sediment pattern. This settlement was also referred to as New Crow Village. Crow Village Sam (Phillips), a future leader of the area's native people, was a youngster at that time and participated in that move. By the 1950s, Crow Village Sam was firmly entrenched as the area's leader. In 1954 he decided the village had to be vacated to stem ongoing issues with epidemics, possibly from lack of knowledge that the epidemics were likely caused by increased contact with white settlers and not directly related to the village itself. He moved the inhabitants upriver 18 miles (29 km) to Chuathbaluk, a village that had been abandoned since 1929.

== Archaeology ==
Given the length of occupancy of Crow Village by the native population, the site has had several archaeological digs. Archaeologist Aleš Hrdlička recovered some bone material from Old Crow Village in 1930 and reportedly took some pictures. In 1953, archaeologist Wendell H. Oswalt collected tree ring samples at New Crow Village. He would return for a three-week study in 1954 with James Van Stone and again in 1963 for the entire summer. The 1963 dig was the most extensive as they researched 5 dwellings in Old Crow Village and interviewed area natives including Crow Village Sam as part of their research into the cultural history of the area. The findings can be found in the book entitled "The Ethnoarchaeology of Crow Village, Alaska". This project pioneered the use of archaeology as a means to augment oral and written sources in constructing a historical ethnography of a Native people.

The Alaska Native Claims Settlement Act of 1971 resulted in Crow Village Sam receiving ownership of the land encompassing Crow Village. This claim was later inherited by his grandson, David Phillips, who re-settled Crow Village with his family in 1994.

Later David's eldest son, Dakota River Phillips, found the motor of Crow Village Sam's old wind power generator. His other children, Raven Myst Phillips and Storm Hudson Phillips, found other artifacts like an old reindeer bell.
