= Bob Herron =

American politician and Alaska statesman

Member of the Alaska House of Representatives from the 38th district
- In office January 19, 2009 – January 23, 2017
- Preceded by: Mary Peltola
- Succeeded by: Zach Fansler

Personal details
- Born: March 9, 1951 (age 75) La Grande, Oregon
- Party: Democratic
- Spouse: Margaret
- Children: Buddy; Charles; Jalene

Military service
- Allegiance: United States of America
- Branch/service: United States Marine Corps
- Rank: Sergeant

Bob Herron (born March 9, 1951) is a Democratic former member of the Alaska House of Representatives, representing the 38th District from 2009 until 2017. Herron was the Majority Whip, granting him the distinction of being the only Representative in the United States elected as a Democrat who served as a statewide leader of a Republican party-majority legislative body. The official job of the Whip is to make sure that House members vote in line with Republican leadership.

Before the beginning of the 26th Legislature, in January 2008 Representative Herron, began caucusing with the Republicans in the House Majority Caucus. During the 2009 and 2010 legislative sessions, Representative Herron served as Co-Chair of the Community & Regional Affairs Committee, Co-Chair of the Health & Social Services Committee, and Vice-Chair of the Rules Committee. During the 2011 legislative session, Representative Herron began serving as the Chair of the Economic Development, Trade and Tourism Committee.

== Elections ==
- 2012 Running unopposed in the primary and general elections, Herron won the November 6, 2012 general election with 96% of the vote.
- 2014 Running unopposed in the primary and general elections, Herron won the November 4, 2014 General election with 97% of the vote.
- 2016 In the August 15th Democratic primary, Herron was defeated 57%-43% by Zach Fansler.

== Personal life ==
Herron has a wife: Margaret, three children: Buddy, Charles & Jalene, and three grand children. Bob Herron graduated from Lathrop High School in 1968.
