= Lavrenty Zagoskin =

Russian naval officer (1808–1890)

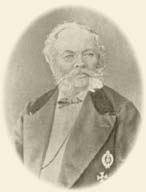

Lavrenty Alekseyevich Zagoskin (Russian: Лаврентий Алексеевич Загоскин; 21 May 1808 – 22 January 1890) was a Russian naval officer and explorer of Alaska.

Zagoskin was born in 1808 in the Russian district of Penza in a village named Nikolayevka. Even though Nikolayevka was not near the ocean, Zagoskin would eventually train for the Russian Navy and served as a naval officer in the Baltic and Caspian seas. He would subsequently receive training in mineralogy, zoology, botany, and entomology from Russian scientist I.G. Voznesensky.

In 1799, Russia formed the Russian America Company and gave it monopolistic powers over the region now known as Alaska as part of their colonization effort. Early Russian explorers like Vitus Bering, Mikhail Gvozdev, and Georg Steller provided knowledge of the coastal region, however by the 1840s very little was known about the interior of the colony. Such knowledge was desired in the hopes of expanding the commercial opportunities for the Russian America Company. Zagoskin was given a two-year assignment to conduct reconnaissance of the region to help determine the most profitable and convenient sites for forts and trading posts in the region - an assignment he was well suited for given his background and in fact a mission he had proposed.

In 1842 and 1843, Zagoskin traveled extensively on the Yukon, Kuskokwim, Innoko and Koyukuk Rivers all told traveling over 3,300 miles (5,300 km). His journals included details about the native people, their customs, language, and environment in the region all noted with remarkable accuracy.

Zagoskin received national Academy of Science award for his work. To this day, his writing is recognized for its accuracy, quality and insight and is often referenced by local residents, historians, anthropologists, and geographers.

Zagoskin died in Ryazan.

== Settlements visited by Zagoskin ==
- Upper Kalskag, Alaska
- Golovin, Alaska
- Shaktoolik, Alaska
- Selawik, Alaska
- Crow Village, Alaska
- Georgetown, Alaska
- Kwigiumpainukamiut, Alaska
