= Tiffany Zulkosky =

American politician (born 1984)

- Zulkosky in 2020

Member of the Alaska House of Representatives from the 38th district
- In office March 9, 2018 – January 17, 2023
- Preceded by: Zach Fansler
- Succeeded by: Conrad McCormick

Mayor of Bethel, Alaska
- In office October 20, 2008 – April 2009
- Preceded by: Eric Middlebrook
- Succeeded by: Joseph Klejka

Personal details
- Born: May 19, 1984 (age 42)
- Party: Democratic
- Education: University of Alaska Southeast
- Occupation: Vice President of Communications at the Yukon Kuskokwim Health Corporation

Tiffany Zulkosky (born May 19, 1984) is an American politician. She represented District 38 in the Alaska House of Representatives from 2018 until 2023, after she chose not to run for re-election. Zulkosky is a Democrat and caucused with the House Majority Caucus. In 2018, she was appointed by Governor Bill Walker and unanimously approved by House Democrats to fill the vacant seat in District 38. Zulkosky, who is Yup'ik, was the only Alaska Native woman to serve in the Alaska Legislature.

== Education ==
Zulkosky graduated from Bethel Regional High School in 2002. She earned a B.A. in Organizational Communications from Northwest University in 2006 and a Master's in Public Administration from the University of Alaska Southeast in 2015.

== Career ==
=== Mayor of Bethel ===
Zulkosky was elected Mayor of Bethel at 24 and holds the distinction of being the youngest Mayor in Bethel's history. She resigned from the position in April 2009 to work as U.S. Senator Mark Begich's Rural Director.

=== Other work ===
Zulkosky served as U.S. Senator Mark Begich's Rural Director from 2009 - 2011. She then became the Alaska West Area Director at USDA until 2013. After, she was the executive director of Nuvista Light and Electric Cooperative until 2016, at which point she became the vice-president of Communications at the Yukon Kuskokwim Health Corporation. Zulkosky was on a "Leave of Absence" from YKHC while the Legislature was in session.

=== Alaska House of Representatives ===
After the resignation of Zach Fansler due to allegations of assault in February 2018, Zulkosky was appointed by Bill Walker, making her the first Yup'ik woman to be a member of the Alaska Legislature.

==== Alaska Native tribes ====
Zulkosky has sought to establish better relationships between the Government of Alaska and Indigenous communities native to Alaska. She has focused on "tribal compacting", which outlines which services will be provided by tribal authorities and which will be provided by the government.

== See also ==
- List of Native American politicians
- Native American women in politics
