= Aniak, Alaska =

Aniak Anyaraq
- City
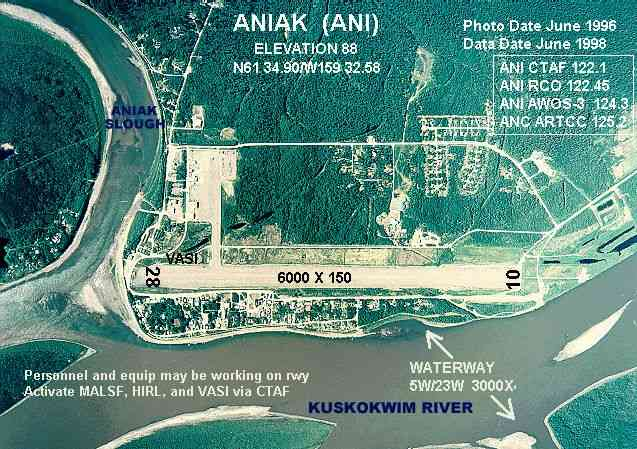
- Aerial view of Aniak, 1996

- Location in Alaska
- Coordinates: 61°34′44″N 159°33′1″W
- Country: United States
- State: Alaska
- Census Area: Bethel
- Incorporated: May 10, 1972

Government
  - Mayor: Dave Bonnano
  - State senator: Lyman Hoffman (D)
  - State rep.: Bryce Edgmon (I)

Area
  - Total: 8.47 sq mi (21.95 km^{2})
  - Land: 6.19 sq mi (16.02 km^{2})
  - Water: 2.29 sq mi (5.93 km^{2})
- Elevation: 49 ft (15 m)

Population (2020)
  - Total: 507
  - Density: 82.0/sq mi (31.65/km^{2})
- Time zone: UTC-9 (Alaska (AKST))
  - Summer (DST): UTC-8 (AKDT)
- ZIP code: 99557
- Area code: 907
- FIPS code: 02-03550
- GNIS feature ID: 1398286

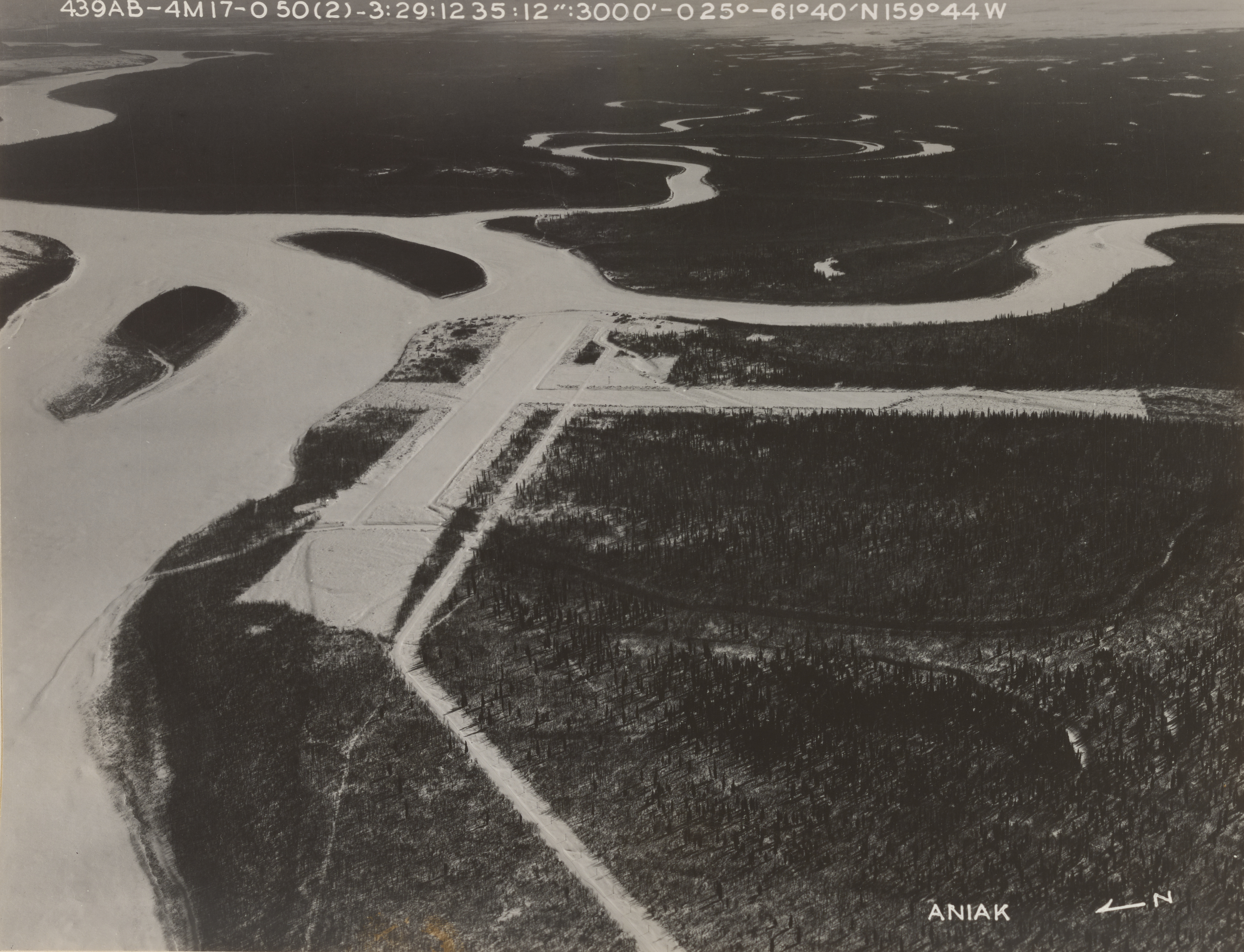
Aniak Landing Field, 1944

Aniak (Central Yupik: Anyaraq) is a city in the Bethel Census Area in the U.S. state of Alaska. As of the 2020 census, Aniak had a population of 507.

== Geography ==
Aniak is on the south bank of the Kuskokwim River at the head of Aniak Slough, 59 miles (95 km) southwest of Russian Mission in the Yukon-Kuskokwim Delta. It lies 92 miles (148 km) northeast of Bethel and 317 miles (510 km) west of Anchorage.

According to the United States Census Bureau, the city has a total area of 8.8 square miles (23 km^{2}), of which, 6.5 square miles (17 km^{2}) of it is land and 2.3 square miles (6.0 km^{2}) of it (25.82%) is water.

=== Climate ===
Climate is maritime in the summer and continental in winter. Temperatures range between -72 and 92 °F. Average yearly precipitation is 19 inches (480 mm), with snowfall of 60 inches (1.5 m).

Climate data for Aniak Airport, Alaska
Month	Jan	Feb	Mar	Apr	May	Jun	Jul	Aug	Sep	Oct	Nov	Dec	Year
Record high °F (°C)	48 (9)	53 (12)	50 (10)	63 (17)	81 (27)	92 (33)	87 (31)	84 (29)	75 (24)	63 (17)	54 (12)	46 (8)	92 (33)
Mean daily maximum °F (°C)	9.7 (−12.4)	15.4 (−9.2)	23.3 (−4.8)	35.2 (1.8)	51.2 (10.7)	62.4 (16.9)	65.2 (18.4)	60.5 (15.8)	52.7 (11.5)	35.3 (1.8)	21.4 (−5.9)	9.3 (−12.6)	36.8 (2.7)
Daily mean °F (°C)	1.2 (−17.1)	5.9 (−14.5)	12.6 (−10.8)	28.1 (−2.2)	42.4 (5.8)	52.9 (11.6)	56.2 (13.4)	52.9 (11.6)	44.8 (7.1)	28.9 (−1.7)	14.2 (−9.9)	1.1 (−17.2)	28.4 (−2.0)
Mean daily minimum °F (°C)	−7.3 (−21.8)	−3.7 (−19.8)	1.9 (−16.7)	17.0 (−8.3)	33.5 (0.8)	43.3 (6.3)	47.2 (8.4)	45.2 (7.3)	36.8 (2.7)	22.2 (−5.4)	7.0 (−13.9)	−7.1 (−21.7)	19.7 (−6.8)
Record low °F (°C)	−72 (−58)	−56 (−49)	−51 (−46)	−34 (−37)	−3 (−19)	28 (−2)	31 (−1)	23 (−5)	5 (−15)	−17 (−27)	−40 (−40)	−55 (−48)	−72 (−58)
Average precipitation inches (mm)	0.82 (21)	0.86 (22)	0.92 (23)	0.71 (18)	1.08 (27)	1.54 (39)	2.34 (59)	4.11 (104)	2.69 (68)	1.20 (30)	1.46 (37)	1.10 (28)	18.83 (476)
Average snowfall inches (cm)	7.6 (19)	9.4 (24)	10.0 (25)	4.5 (11)	1.1 (2.8)	0.0 (0.0)	0.0 (0.0)	0.0 (0.0)	0.0 (0.0)	3.3 (8.4)	10.0 (25)	10.0 (25)	55.9 (140.2)
Source: WRCC

== Demographics ==
Historical population
Census	Pop.	Note	%±
1940	122		—
1950	142		16.4%
1960	308		116.9%
1970	205		−33.4%
1980	341		66.3%
1990	540		58.4%
2000	572		5.9%
2010	501		−12.4%
2020	507		1.2%
U.S. Decennial Census

Aniak first appeared on the 1940 U.S. Census as an unincorporated village. It formally incorporated in 1972.

=== 2020 census ===
As of the 2020 census, Aniak had a population of 507. The median age was 31.5 years. 29.0% of residents were under the age of 18 and 9.9% of residents were 65 years of age or older. For every 100 females there were 100.4 males, and for every 100 females age 18 and over there were 94.6 males age 18 and over.

0.0% of residents lived in urban areas, while 100.0% lived in rural areas.

There were 156 households in Aniak, of which 48.7% had children under the age of 18 living in them. Of all households, 39.1% were married-couple households, 16.7% were households with a male householder and no spouse or partner present, and 29.5% were households with a female householder and no spouse or partner present. About 16.6% of all households were made up of individuals and 7.0% had someone living alone who was 65 years of age or older.

There were 221 housing units, of which 29.4% were vacant. The homeowner vacancy rate was 0.0% and the rental vacancy rate was 3.8%.

Racial composition as of the 2020 census
Race	Number	Percent
White	88	17.4%
Black or African American	1	0.2%
American Indian and Alaska Native	366	72.2%
Asian	1	0.2%
Native Hawaiian and Other Pacific Islander	0	0.0%
Some other race	0	0.0%
Two or more races	51	10.1%
Hispanic or Latino (of any race)	11	2.2%

=== 2000 census ===
As of the 2000 census, there were 572 people, 174 households, and 133 families residing in the city. The population density was 87.8 inhabitants per square mile (33.9/km^{2}). There were 203 housing units at an average density of 31.1 units per square mile (12.0 units/km^{2}). The racial makeup of the city was 25.00% White, 0.35% Black or African American, 68.36% Native American, 0.52% Asian, and 5.77% from two or more races. 1.05% of the population were Hispanic or Latino of any race.

There were 174 households, out of which 51.1% had children under the age of 18 living with them, 52.9% were married couples living together, 13.2% had a female householder with 0 husbands present, and 23.0% were non-families. 20.7% of all households were made up of individuals, and 4.0% had someone living alone who was 65 years of age or older. The average household size was 3.29 and the average family size was 3.74.

In the city, the age distribution of the population shows 40.9% under the age of 18, 6.8% from 18 to 24, 27.3% from 25 to 44, 20.3% from 45 to 64, and 4.7% who were 65 years of age or older. The median age was 28 years. For every 100 females, there were 108.8 males. For every 100 females age 18 and over, there were 107.4 males.

The median income for a household in the city was $41,875, and the median income for a family was $43,750. Males had a median income of $37,708 versus $34,500 for females. The per capita income for the city was $16,550. About 11.8% of families and 14.0% of the population were below the poverty line, including 13.4% of those under age 18 and 12.5% of those age 65 or over.

== History ==
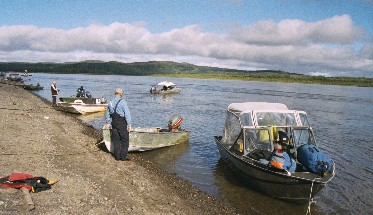
Shoreline of the Kuskokwim River at Aniak

Aniak is the Central Alaskan Yup'ik name for the area around present-day Aniak. The word means "the place where it comes out" - that is, where the Aniak River flows into the Kuskokwim. The local Yup'ik people had deserted the original village at Aniak by the early-19th century, when Russian explorers first arrived in the area.

20th-century prospectors believed that the early Russian traders discovered gold in a tributary to the Kuskokwim called "Yellow River" in 1832. Many think that the Yellow River these traders referred to is the Aniak River. Russian traders did discover a mercury deposit near the trading post called Kolmakov Redoubt 22 miles (35 km) east of Aniak in 1838. Placer gold was found by Russian traders in New York Creek 30 miles (48 km) east of Aniak in 1844. The Russians, however, did not engage in any significant mining activities, and it wasn't until after Washington's purchase of Alaska in 1867 that the American prospectors began seriously investigating the potential for prospecting along the Kuskokwim river. A handful of prospecting parties began venturing into the area, however they had to travel great distances to an area where trading posts were few and far between, so the activity was limited, especially given the exposure of other late-19th century strikes in Alaska which were better served by existing infrastructure.

The euphoria caused by the Klondike Gold Rush in 1897-98 would set the stage for a change however, with thousands of prospectors across the District of Alaska poised to make a rush upon rumor of each potential new strike. One such rush was the Yellow River Stampede of 1900, in which many prospectors left Nome to venture into the Kuskokwim basin upon rumors that someone had found the Yellow River strike - despite the feven although the location of that strike was unknown. Finding precious little gold and experiencing substantial hardship, many of these folks would return to Nome following the difficult winter of 1901, but some stayed behind to continue their search. A 1906 gold-discovery at the head of the Innoko River, a tributary of the Yukon River, caused another gold rush in 1907, with many of the prospectors choosing to access the site via the Kuskokwim River instead. Trading posts were established at the Takotna River which required riverboat service to travel the Kuskokwim river. With riverboat service now available on the Kuskokwim River, prospecting activity picked up, and some strikes started to occur in the Kuskokwim basin. Strikes were made at Crooked Creek, George River, New York Creek, and Aniak River among others. Most strikes were short-lived. However, the Kuskokwim River was now seeing an increase in river traffic that needed servicing.

In 1910, a lone prospector named "Old Man" Keeler reportedly found placer gold in the Aniak River basin. In 1911, three prospectors, Harry Buhro, E. W. "Kid" Fisher, and Fred Labelle, who had been working the George River area, decided to give the Aniak River basin area a try; they discovered gold at Marvel, Fisher, and Dome creeks. These creeks feed into the Aniak River about 50 miles (80 km) south of Aniak. Initially prospectors would reach this site by poling up the river in boats, however that was a difficult journey due to the nature of the river. The trip would take 15 to 20 days from the Kuskokwim river. By 1913, a hydraulic plant had been installed at Marvel Creek and in 1914 construction of a 70-mile (110 km) cat trail began, starting 1-mile (1.6 km) south of Aniak on the mouth of the Aniak Slough and proceeding to the diggings at Marvel Creek. The cat trail was last used in the spring of 2006 by miners still working claims.

In 1914, Tom L. Johnson homesteaded the site of the long-abandoned Yup'ik village in the Aniak area and opened a store and post office there to service prospectors and miners in the vicinity. Willie Pete and Sam Simeon brought their Yup'ik families from Ohagamiut to Aniak. In 1936 a territorial school was opened. In anticipation of the Lend-Lease program to help supply Russia with war materials, construction of an airfield began in 1939. With the airfield in place, Aniak became the transportation hub for villages in the area including Chuathbaluk, Anvik, Kalskag, Crooked Creek, Holy Cross and others. In 1956 during the Cold War, construction of a White Alice Relay Station began bringing money, jobs, and communication capability to the area. The impact to the community from the relay station was immediate: the first telephone capable of long-distance phone calls was installed at the Aniak Lodge in 1957 and Aniak's population more than doubled from 142 in 1950 to 308 in 1960. The 2000 census places Aniak's population at 572.

== Education ==
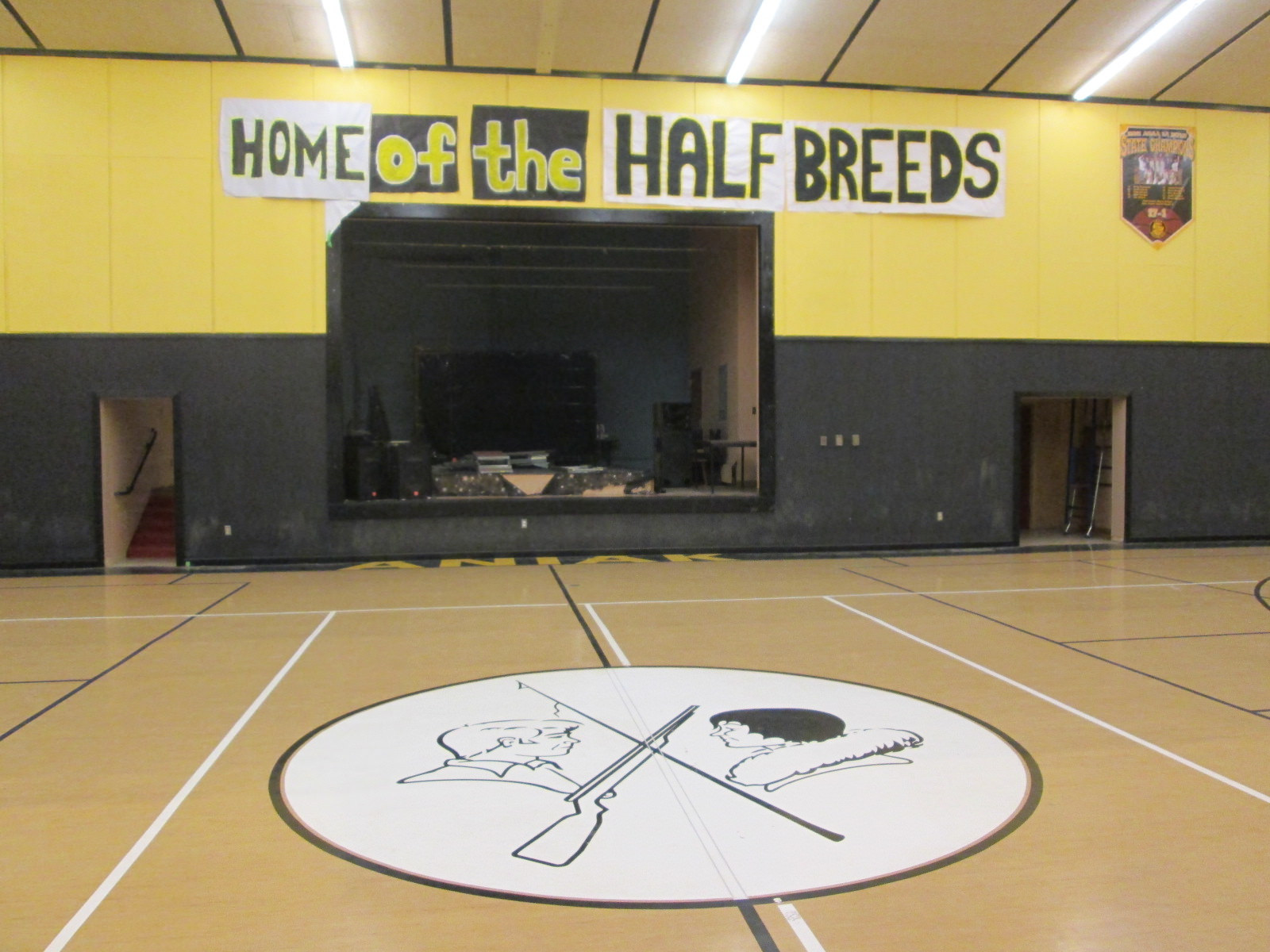
Aniak Jr/Sr High School

The Kuspuk School District operates two schools in Aniak: Auntie Mary Nicoli Elementary School and Aniak Jr/Sr High School. They share an extended architecture which is structurally imperiled.

== Notable residents ==
- Sam Phillips (Yup'ik), also known as Crow Village Sam (ca. 1893–ca. 1974), a Yup'ik community leader was born here
- Matt Bissonnette, a former United States Navy SEAL and author who participated in Operation Neptune Spear.
