= Chuathbaluk, Alaska =

Chuathbaluk Curarpalek
- City
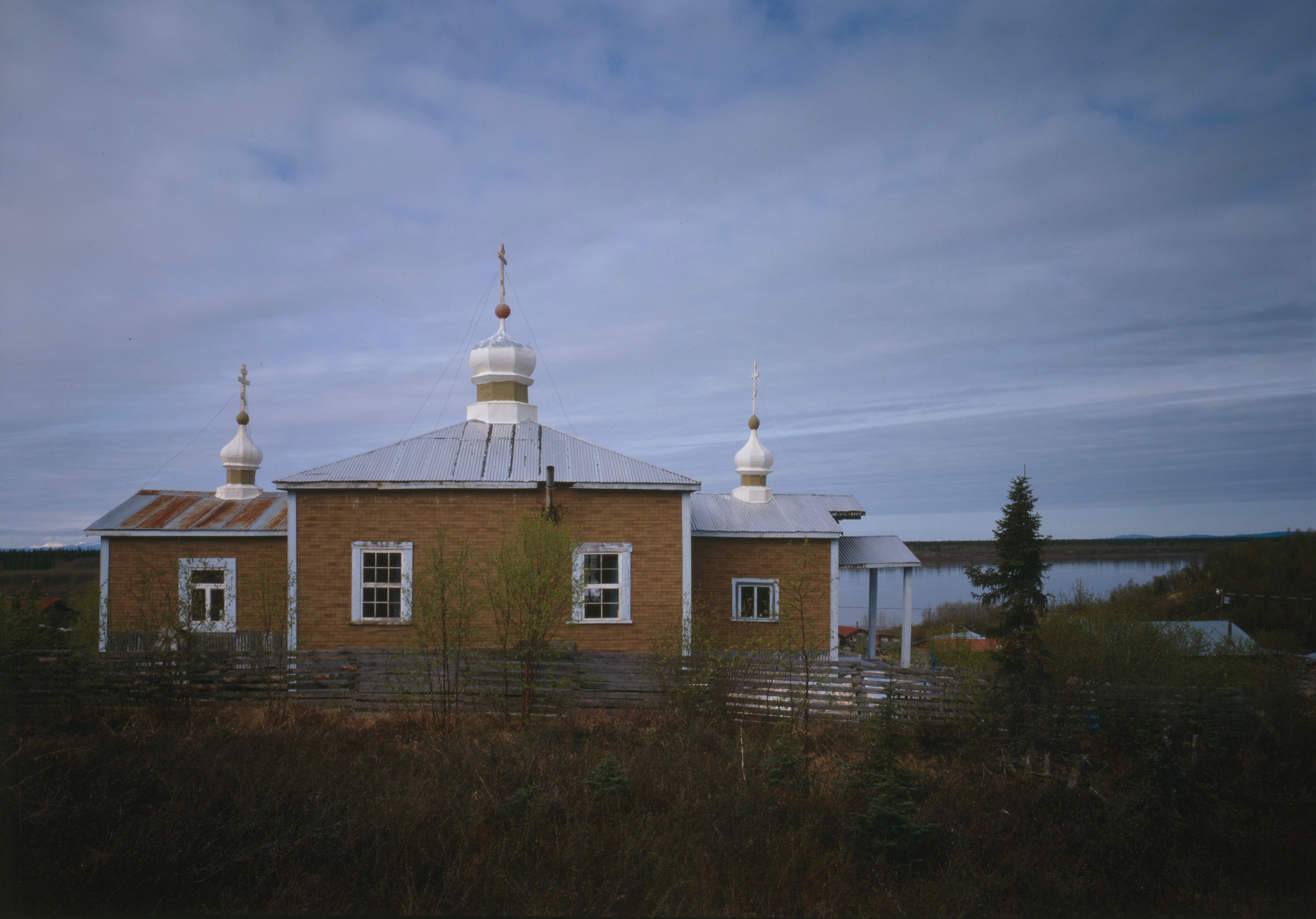
- St. Sergius Chapel

- Location in Alaska
- Coordinates: 61°34′32″N 159°14′50″W
- Country: United States
- State: Alaska
- Census area: Bethel
- Incorporated: 1975

Government
  - Mayor: Robert Golley, Jr.
  - State senator: Lyman Hoffman (D)
  - State rep.: Bryce Edgmon (I)

Area
  - Total: 6.22 sq mi (16.12 km^{2})
  - Land: 4.47 sq mi (11.58 km^{2})
  - Water: 1.75 sq mi (4.54 km^{2})
- Elevation: 154 ft (47 m)

Population (2020)
  - Total: 104
  - Density: 23.3/sq mi (8.98/km^{2})
- Time zone: UTC-9 (Alaska (AKST))
  - Summer (DST): UTC-8 (AKDT)
- ZIP code: 99557
- Area code: 907
- FIPS code: 02-14330
- GNIS feature ID: 1400376

Chuathbaluk (Central Yupik: Curarpalek) is a city in Bethel Census Area, Alaska, United States.

At the 2020 census the population was 102, down from 118 in 2010.

== Geography ==
Chuathbaluk is located at 61°34′32″N 159°14′50″W (61.575693, -159.247311), on the Kuskokwim River, approximately 100 miles (160 km) upstream from Bethel. The Russian Mountains, a small circular mountain range, stand just to the north of the town.

According to the United States Census Bureau, the city has a total area of 5.2 square miles (13.4 km^{2}), of which 3.5 square miles (9.0 km^{2}) is land and 1.7 square miles (4.5 km^{2}), or 33.19%, is water.

== Demographics ==
Historical population
Census	Pop.	Note	%±
1970	94		—
1980	105		11.7%
1990	97		−7.6%
2000	119		22.7%
2010	118		−0.8%
2020	104		−11.9%
U.S. Decennial Census

Chuathbaluk first appeared on the 1970 census as an unincorporated village. It formally incorporated in 1975. Prior to that, the community had been known as "Little Russian Mission." This was not to be confused with the present city of Russian Mission (Ikogmute) on the Yukon, so it was often called the Little Russian Mission to avoid confusion. Under the prior name, it never reported a population separately.

=== 2020 census ===
As of the 2020 census, Chuathbaluk had a population of 104. The median age was 26.0 years. 39.4% of residents were under the age of 18 and 11.5% of residents were 65 years of age or older. For every 100 females there were 131.1 males, and for every 100 females age 18 and over there were 117.2 males age 18 and over.

0.0% of residents lived in urban areas, while 100.0% lived in rural areas.

There were 33 households in Chuathbaluk, of which 48.5% had children under the age of 18 living in them. Of all households, 24.2% were married-couple households, 30.3% were households with a male householder and no spouse or partner present, and 39.4% were households with a female householder and no spouse or partner present. About 27.3% of all households were made up of individuals and 9.1% had someone living alone who was 65 years of age or older.

There were 40 housing units, of which 17.5% were vacant. The homeowner vacancy rate was 0.0% and the rental vacancy rate was 0.0%.

Racial composition as of the 2020 census
Race	Number	Percent
White	4	3.8%
Black or African American	0	0.0%
American Indian and Alaska Native	92	88.5%
Asian	0	0.0%
Native Hawaiian and Other Pacific Islander	0	0.0%
Some other race	0	0.0%
Two or more races	8	7.7%
Hispanic or Latino (of any race)	1	1.0%

=== 2000 census ===
As of the census of 2000, there were 119 people, 33 households, and 23 families residing in the city. The population density was 33.8 inhabitants per square mile (13.1/km^{2}). There were 43 housing units at an average density of 12.2 units per square mile (4.7 units/km^{2}). The racial makeup of the city was 5.04% White, 91.60% Native American, 0.84% from other races, and 2.52% from two or more races.

There were 33 households, out of which 45.5% had children under the age of 18 living with them, 30.3% were married couples living together, 27.3% had a female householder with no husband present, and 27.3% were non-families. 21.2% of all households were made up of individuals, and 3.0% had someone living alone who was 65 years of age or older. The average household size was 3.61 and the average family size was 4.21.

In the city, the age distribution of the population shows 42.9% under the age of 18, 8.4% from 18 to 24, 28.6% from 25 to 44, 16.0% from 45 to 64, and 4.2% who were 65 years of age or older. The median age was 23 years. For every 100 females, there were 91.9 males. For every 100 females age 18 and over, there were 106.1 males.

The median income for a household in the city was $34,286, and the median income for a family was $34,167. Males had a median income of $46,250 versus $28,750 for females. The per capita income for the city was $10,100. There were 16.7% of families and 24.1% of the population living below the poverty line, including 27.5% of under eighteens and none of those over 64.

== History ==
During the 19th century, Deg Hit'an Athabascan people had summer fish camps in the area. The Russian Orthodox Church built the St. Sergius Mission by 1894, and residents of Kukuktuk from 20 miles (32 km) downriver moved to the mission.

Once established, village has been called Chukbak, St. Sergius Mission, Kuskokwim Russian Mission, and Little Russian Mission. The village was often confused with Russian Mission on the Yukon, so in the 1960s the name was changed to Chuathbaluk, which is derived from the Yup'ik word Curapalek, meaning "the hills where the big blueberries grow."

Much of the village was lost in an influenza epidemic in 1900. By 1929, the site was deserted, although Russian Orthodox members continued to hold services at the mission. In 1954, the Crow Village Sam Phillips family from Crow Village resettled the mission, and later residents of Aniak and Crooked Creek joined their settlement. The church was rebuilt in the late 1950s, and a state school opened in the 1960s. The city was incorporated in 1975.

== Education ==
The Kuspuk School District operates a K-12 rural school, Crow Village Sam School.

== Notable residents ==
- "Crow Village" Sam Phillips (Yup'ik, c. 1893–1974), community leader, boat builder, translator
