= Georgetown, Alaska =

Unincorporated community in the state of Alaska, United States

Georgetown
- Unincorporated community village
- Location within the state of Alaska
- Coordinates: 61°53′56″N 157°42′4″W
- Country: United States
- State: Alaska
- Census area: Bethel

Government
  - State senator: Lyman Hoffman (D)
  - State rep.: Bryce Edgmon (D)

Population (2010)
  - Total: 2
- Time zone: UTC-9 (Alaska (AKST))
  - Summer (DST): UTC-8 (AKDT)

Georgetown is an unincorporated Alaska Native village located in the Bethel Census Area of the U.S. state of Alaska. The population as of the 2010 census was 2, down from 3 in 2000.

== Geography ==
Georgetown is located at 61°53′N 157°42′W on the north bank of the upper Kuskokwim River in the Kilbuck-Kuskokwim mountains. It is 16 miles (26 km) downstream of Red Devil just upstream of the mouth of the George River. Georgetown is accessible by boat, snowmobile (winter), or small plane.

== History ==
This section of the Kuskokwim river first had contact with non-Native explorers in the mid-19th century. Lt. Lavrenty Zagoskin of the Russian Imperial Navy explored the area in 1844. The village was known by its native name of Keledzhichagat at that time. It was used as a summer fish camp for residents of Kwigiumpainukamiut. In 1909, gold was discovered up the George River and a mining settlement quickly developed. This settlement was located on the bank of the Kuskokwim river just west of the mouth of the George River.

The settlement and the river were named for three traders named George: George Hoffman, George Fredericks and George Morgan. By 1910, the population of Georgetown increased to about 300 with about 200 dwellings due to the mining activity. A fire swept through the town in 1911 and destroyed most of these buildings. By 1953, the only large structure that remained at the original site was the two-story log house belonging to George Fredericks.

A second settlement began to develop east of the George River, and this settlement was also called Georgetown. A state school was established in 1965. As mining activity declined, residents began leaving and the school was closed in 1970.

The Alaska Native Claims Settlement Act provided an opportunity for the town's descendants to take ownership of the land, and the Native Village of Georgetown was established in 1971. As of 1 June 2009, the Georgetown Tribal Council had 128 members, and most surviving original members and their descendants still live in the vicinity.

== Demographics ==
Historical population
Census	Pop.	Note	%±
1980	6		—
1990	0		−100.0%
2000	3		—
2010	2		−33.3%
U.S. Decennial Census

Georgetown first appeared on the 1980 U.S. Census as an unincorporated native village. It was given the designation of Alaskan Native Village Statistical Area (ANVSA) in 1990, although it reported no residents that census. It has reported 3 residents in 2000 and 2 in 2010.
