= Zach Fansler =

American politician

Member of the Alaska House of Representatives from the 38th district
- In office January 23, 2017 – February 12, 2018
- Preceded by: Bob Herron
- Succeeded by: Tiffany Zulkosky

Personal details
- Born: Lebanon, Pennsylvania
- Party: Democratic
- Education: Saint Joseph's University (BS); Temple University (JD)

Zach Fansler is an American politician. He served on the Bethel City Council from 2014 to 2016, and in the Alaska House of Representatives from the 38th District from 2017 to 2018. He was first elected to the House in 2016, defeating Majority Whip Bob Herron in the Democratic primary. Fansler resigned on February 12, 2018, due to allegations of assault.

== Biography ==
=== Early life ===
Fansler was born in Lebanon, Pennsylvania. He has lived in Bethel, Alaska since 2011, and lived there previously from 2001 to 2004. He served on the Bethel City Council from 2014 to 2016, and has worked for the Tundra Women's Coalition and was on the faculty at the University of Alaska Fairbanks. Zach also worked for Angstman Law Office providing legal services & the k300 as a manager.

=== Alaska House of Representatives ===
Fansler was first elected to the Alaska House of Representatives in 2016. While he ran unopposed in the general election, Fansler defeated Bob Herron in the primary with 57% of the vote. Herron was the Majority Whip for the Republican Party at the time.

==== Climate ====
In 2017, Fansler visited villages in the Yukon–Kuskokwim Delta to learn about the threat to the communities posed by flooding and erosion due to climate change. Fansler said that the erosion "is something that we see in almost every village that we go to," and while he would not make a promise, he said that he was hopeful that the visit would help him better advocate for solutions.

==== Assault allegations ====
On January 25, 2018, the Juneau Empire reported that Fansler was being investigated an incident that took place on the night of January 13, in which Fansler twice slapped a woman while drunk in a hotel room, which caused a rupture in her eardrum. Fansler's attorney denied the allegation on his behalf. Bryce Edgmon, the Speaker of the Alaska House of Representatives, asked for Fansler's resignation, stating that "Credible information came to my attention yesterday afternoon that Rep. Fansler had possibly behaved in a manner unbecoming of a legislator."

On February 2, Fansler announced that he would resign from the Alaska House of Representatives, effective February 12. He pled guilty to second-degree harassment, and was sentenced to ten days of suspended sentence, as well as eighty hours of community service, a year of probation, a yearlong ban from alcohol, and an order to seek treatment for alcoholism.

== Electoral history ==
=== 2016 ===
Alaska House of Representatives election, district 38
Primary election
Party	Candidate	Votes	%
Democratic	Zach Fansler	1,234	57.32%
Democratic	Bob Herron (Incumbent)	919	42.68%
Total votes		2,153	100.0
General election
Democratic	Zach Fansler	4,134	95.63%
Other	Write-ins	189	4.37%
Total votes		4,323	100.0
