= Crooked Creek, Alaska =

Crooked Creek Qipcarpak
- Census-designated place
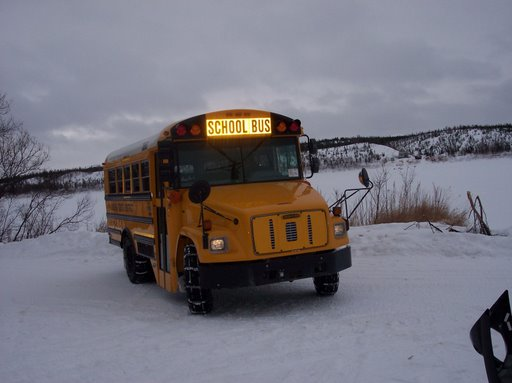
- School bus service at Crooked Creek

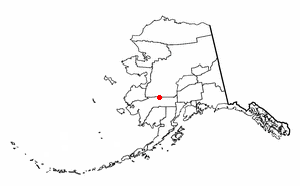
- Location of Crooked Creek, Alaska
- Coordinates: 61°51′35″N 158°7′44″W
- Country: United States
- State: Alaska
- Census Area: Bethel

Government
  - State senator: Lyman Hoffman (D)
  - State rep.: Bryce Edgmon (I)

Area
  - Total: 107.39 sq mi (278.13 km^{2})
  - Land: 99.83 sq mi (258.55 km^{2})
  - Water: 7.56 sq mi (19.59 km^{2})

Population (2020)
  - Total: 90
  - Density: 0.91/sq mi (0.35/km^{2})
- Time zone: UTC-9 (Alaska (AKST))
  - Summer (DST): UTC-8 (AKDT)
- ZIP code: 99575
- Area code: 907
- FIPS code: 02-17850

Crooked Creek (Central Yupik: Qipcarpak) is a census-designated place (CDP) in Bethel Census Area, Alaska, United States. As of the 2020 census, Crooked Creek had a population of 90.

== Geography ==
The Crooked Creek CDP is located at 61°51′35″N 158°7′44″W (61.859821, -158.128884) on the north bank of the Kuskokwim River, at the mouth of Crooked Creek in the Kuskokwim Mountains. It is approximately 120 miles (190 km) northeast (upriver) of Bethel.

According to the United States Census Bureau, the CDP has a total area of 107.4 square miles (278.1 km^{2}), of which 99.8 square miles (258.5 km^{2}) is land and 7.6 square miles (19.6 km^{2}), or 7.05%, is water.

== Demographics ==
Historical population
Census	Pop.	Note	%±
1940	48		—
1950	43		−10.4%
1960	92		114.0%
1970	59		−35.9%
1980	108		83.1%
1990	106		−1.9%
2000	137		29.2%
2010	105		−23.4%
2020	90		−14.3%
U.S. Decennial Census

Crooked Creek first appeared on the 1940 U.S. Census as an unincorporated village. It was made a census-designated place (CDP) in 1980.

As of the census of 2000, there were 137 people, 38 households, and 31 families residing in the CDP. The population density was 1.4 inhabitants per square mile (0.54/km^{2}). There were 46 housing units at an average density of 0.5 per square mile (0.19/km^{2}). The racial makeup of the CDP was 6.57% White, 90.51% Native American, and 2.92% from two or more races.

There were 38 households, out of which 57.9% had children under the age of 18 living with them, 39.5% were married couples living together, 31.6% had a female householder with no husband present, and 18.4% were non-families. 18.4% of all households were made up of individuals, and 5.3% had someone living alone who was 65 years of age or older. The average household size was 3.61 and the average family size was 4.00.

In the CDP, the population was spread out, with 41.6% under the age of 18, 8.8% from 18 to 24, 32.1% from 25 to 44, 13.1% from 45 to 64, and 4.4% who were 65 years of age or older. The median age was 25 years. For every 100 females, there were 114.1 males. For every 100 females age 18 and over, there were 116.2 males.

The median income for a household in the CDP was $17,500, and the median income for a family was $23,125. Males had a median income of $13,750 versus $21,250 for females. The per capita income for the CDP was $6,495. There were 25.0% of families and 28.1% of the population living below the poverty line, including 23.0% of under eighteens and 20.0% of those over 64.

== Services and utilities ==
As of July 2009, running water and plumbing in Crooked Creek are available at the school, teacher housing, "washeteria", lodge, and store. The honey bucket system is used in most of the community. Water is generally brought to homes from either the Kuskokwim River or purchased at the Washeteria. At the Washeteria, laundry services (washer and dryer) and showers are available for purchase.

The community has a store, a "lodge" (similar to a bed and breakfast with shared bathrooms), a school, and a Washeteria. Cell phone services have been operating in the area since January 2017, and land line service is available. Internet is available at the school and now available for private homes.

== Education ==
The Kuspuk School District operates a K-12 rural school, Johnnie John Sr. School. It had approximately 22 students (December 2017).
