= List of airports in Alaska =

Airports

Commercial airports in Alaska

This is a list of airports in Alaska, grouped by type and sorted by location. It contains all public-use and military airports in the state. Some private-use and former airports may be included where notable, such as airports that were previously public-use, those with commercial enplanements recorded by the FAA or airports assigned an IATA airport code.

== Airports ==
This list contains the following information:

- **City served** – The city generally associated with the airport, as per the airport's master record with the Federal Aviation Administration. This is not always the actual location since some airports are located in smaller towns outside of the city they serve. It is not meant to be a complete list of cities served, which can be found in or added to each airport's Wikipedia article.
- **FAA** – The location identifier assigned by the Federal Aviation Administration (FAA).
- **IATA** – The airport code assigned by the International Air Transport Association (IATA). Those that do not match the FAA code are shown in bold.
- **ICAO** – The location indicator assigned by the International Civil Aviation Organization (ICAO).
- **Airport name** – The official airport name. Those shown in **bold** indicate the airport has scheduled passenger service on commercial airlines.
- **Role** – One of four FAA airport categories, as per the 2023 - 2027 National Plan of Integrated Airport Systems (NPIAS) report:
  - P-s: Commercial service – primary are publicly owned airports that receive scheduled passenger service and have more than 10,000 passenger boardings (enplanements) each year. Each primary airport is sub-classified by the FAA as one of the following four "hub" types (s):
    - L: Large hub that accounts for at least 1% of total U.S. passenger enplanements.
    - M: Medium hub that accounts for between 0.25% and 1% of total U.S. passenger enplanements.
    - S: Small hub that accounts for between 0.05% and 0.25% of total U.S. passenger enplanements.
    - N: Nonhub that accounts for less than 0.05% of total U.S. passenger enplanements, but more than 10,000 annual enplanements.
  - CS: Commercial service – nonprimary are publicly owned airports that receive scheduled passenger service and have at least 2,500 passenger boardings each year.
  - R: Reliever airports are designated by the FAA to relieve congestion at a large commercial service airport and to provide more general aviation access to the overall community.
  - GA: General aviation airports are the largest single group of airports in the U.S. airport system. They are public-use airports that do not have scheduled service or have scheduled service with less than 2,500 passenger boardings each year.
- **Enplanements** – The number of enplanements (commercial passenger boardings) that occurred at the airport in calendar year 2024, as per FAA records.

City served	FAA	IATA	ICAO	Airport name	Role	Enplanements (2024)
				**Commercial service – primary airports**		
Anchorage	MRI	MRI	PAMR	**Merrill Field**	P-N	32,601
Anchorage	ANC	ANC	PANC	**Ted Stevens Anchorage International Airport**	P-M	2,767,856
Bethel	BET	BET	PABE	**Bethel Airport** (also see Bethel Seaplane Base)	P-N	165,846
Cordova	CDV	CDV	PACV	**Merle K. (Mudhole) Smith Airport**	P-N	18,641
Deadhorse	SCC	SCC	PASC	**Deadhorse Airport** (Prudhoe Bay Airport)	P-N	96,967
Dillingham	DLG	DLG	PADL	**Dillingham Airport**	P-N	34,656
Fairbanks	FAI	FAI	PAFA	**Fairbanks International Airport**	P-S	574,012
Gustavus	GST	GST	PAGS	**Gustavus Airport**	P-N	10,074
Homer	HOM	HOM	PAHO	**Homer Airport**	P-N	27,482
Juneau	JNU	JNU	PAJN	**Juneau International Airport**	P-N	436,457
Kenai	ENA	ENA	PAEN	**Kenai Municipal Airport**	P-N	75,395
Ketchikan	KTN	KTN	PAKT	**Ketchikan International Airport**	P-N	152,082
King Salmon	AKN	AKN	PAKN	**King Salmon Airport**	P-N	39,289
Klawock	AKW	**KLW**	PAKW	**Klawock Airport** (also see Klawock Seaplane Base)	P-N	16,224
Kodiak	ADQ	ADQ	PADQ	**Kodiak Airport** (Benny Benson State Airport)	P-N	86,579
Kotzebue	OTZ	OTZ	PAOT	**Ralph Wien Memorial Airport**	P-N	60,547
Nome	OME	OME	PAOM	**Nome Airport**	P-N	69,593
Petersburg	PSG	PSG	PAPG	**Petersburg James A. Johnson Airport**	P-N	25,209
Sitka	SIT	SIT	PASI	**Sitka Rocky Gutierrez Airport**	P-N	98,066
Unalaska	DUT	DUT	PADU	**Unalaska Airport** (Tom Madsen/Dutch Harbor Airport)	P-N	22,712
Utqiaġvik (Barrow)	BRW	BRW	PABR	**Wiley Post–Will Rogers Memorial Airport**	P-N	43,364
Wrangell	WRG	WRG	PAWG	**Wrangell Airport** (also see Wrangell Seaplane Base)	P-N	14,560
Yakutat	YAK	YAK	PAYA	**Yakutat Airport** (also see Yakutat Seaplane Base)	P-N	11,923
				**Commercial service – nonprimary airports**		
Aniak	ANI	ANI	PANI	**Aniak Airport**	CS	5,579
Buckland	BVK	**BKC**	PABL	**Buckland Airport**	CS	3,835
Chevak	VAK	VAK	PAVA	**Chevak Airport**	CS	5,426
Cold Bay	CDB	CDB	PACD	**Cold Bay Airport**	CS	3,543
Coldfoot	CXF	CXF	PACX	Coldfoot Airport	CS	5,985
Emmonak	ENM	**EMK**	PAEM	**Emmonak Airport**	CS	9,854
Fort Yukon	FYU	FYU	PFYU	**Fort Yukon Airport**	CS	5,492
Galena	GAL	GAL	PAGA	**Edward G. Pitka Sr. Airport**	CS	11,852
Haines	HNS	HNS	PAHN	**Haines Airport** (also see Haines Seaplane Base)	CS	6,362
Hoonah	HNH	HNH	PAOH	**Hoonah Airport** (also see Hoonah Seaplane Base)	CS	5,667
Hooper Bay	HPB	HPB	PAHP	**Hooper Bay Airport**	CS	4,801
Iliamna	ILI	ILI	PAIL	**Iliamna Airport**	CS	5,544
Kake	AFE		PAFE	Kake Airport (also see Kake Seaplane Base)	CS	3,372
Kipnuk	IIK	**KPN**	PAKI	**Kipnuk Airport**	CS	4,978
Noatak	WTK	WTK	PAWN	**Noatak Airport**	CS	4,062
Point Hope	PHO	PHO	PAPO	**Point Hope Airport**	CS	3,998
Quinhagak	AQH	**KWN**	PAQH	**Quinhagak Airport**	CS	5,733
Selawik	WLK	WLK	PASK	**Selawik Airport**	CS	4,154
Seldovia	SOV	SOV	PASO	Seldovia Airport (also see Seldovia Seaplane Base)	CS	4,309
Shishmaref	SHH	SHH	PASH	**Shishmaref Airport**	CS	3,282
Skagway	SGY	SGY	PAGY	**Skagway Airport** (also see Skagway Seaplane Base)	CS	4,607
St. Mary's	KSM	KSM	PASM	**St. Mary's Airport**	CS	4,250
Unalakleet	UNK	UNK	PAUN	**Unalakleet Airport**	CS	7,030
Valdez	VDZ	VDZ	PAVD	Valdez Airport (Pioneer Field)	CS	2,874
				**General aviation airports**		
Adak	ADK	ADK	PADK	**Adak Airport** (Adak Station / Mitchell Field)	GA	2,179
Akhiok	AKK	AKK	PAKH	**Akhiok Airport**	GA	547
Akiachak	Z13	**KKI**	PFZK	**Akiachak Airport** (also see Akiachak Seaplane Base)	GA	3,448
Akiak	AKI	AKI	PFAK	**Akiak Airport**	GA	2,674
Akutan	7AK		PAUT	**Akutan Airport** (Akun Airport)	GA	2,225
Akutan	KQA			**Akutan Seaplane Base**	GA	1,351
Alakanuk	AUK	AUK	PAUK	**Alakanuk Airport**	GA	3,430
Aleknagik	5A8	**WKK**		Aleknagik Airport (also see Aleknagik Seaplane Base)	GA	0
Allakaket	6A8	**AET**	PFAL	**Allakaket Airport**	GA	1,521
Ambler	AFM	**ABL**	PAFM	**Ambler Airport**	GA	1,812
Anaktuvuk Pass	AKP	AKP	PAKP	**Anaktuvuk Pass Airport**	GA	3,255
Anchorage	LHD		PALH	Lake Hood Seaplane Base (also Lake Hood Airstrip)	GA	11,200
Angoon	AGN	AGN	PAGN	**Angoon Seaplane Base**	GA	2,216
Anvik	ANV	ANV	PANV	**Anvik Airport** (also see Anvik Seaplane Base)	GA	590
Arctic Village	ARC	ARC	PARC	**Arctic Village Airport**	GA	1,763
Atka	AKA	**AKB**	PAAK	**Atka Airport**	GA	276
Atmautluak	4A2	**ATT**	PAAB	**Atmautluak Airport**	GA	2,733
Atqasuk	ATK	ATK	PATQ	**Atqasuk Edward Burnell Sr. Memorial Airport**	GA	1,351
Baranof / Warm Springs Bay	BNF	BNF		Warm Springs Bay Seaplane Base	GA	16
Beaver	WBQ	WBQ	PAWB	**Beaver Airport**	GA	831
Bettles	BTT	BTT	PABT	**Bettles Airport**	GA	1,695
Big Lake	BGQ	BGQ	PAGQ	Big Lake Airport	GA	0
Birch Creek	Z91	**KBC**	PAAR	**Birch Creek Airport**	GA	287
Birchwood	BCV		PABV	Birchwood Airport	GA	0
Boundary	BYA	BYA		**Boundary Airport**	GA	0
Brevig Mission	KTS	KTS	PFKT	**Brevig Mission Airport**	GA	2,267
Central	CEM	CEM	PACE	**Central Airport**	GA	7
Chalkyitsik	CIK	CIK	PACI	**Chalkyitsik Airport**	GA	686
Chandalar Camp	5CD		PAAG	Chandalar Shelf Airport	GA	0
Chandalar Lake	WCR	WCR	PALR	Chandalar Lake Airport	GA	29
Chefornak	CFK	**CYF**	PACK	**Chefornak Airport**	GA	3,330
Chenega	C05	**NCN**	PFCB	**Chenega Bay Airport**	GA	595
Chicken	CKX	CKX	PAAY	**Chicken Airport**	GA	12
Chignik	AJC		PAJC	**Chignik Airport**	GA	554
Chignik Flats	KCL	KCL		**Chignik Lagoon Airport**	GA	470
Chignik Lake	A79	**KCQ**		**Chignik Lake Airport**	GA	226
Chisana	CZN	CZN		**Chisana Airport**	GA	125
Chitina	CXC	CXC	PAAX	**Chitina Airport**	GA	6
Chuathbaluk	9A3	**CHU**	PACH	**Chuathbaluk Airport**	GA	344
Circle	CRC	**IRC**	PACR	**Circle City Airport**	GA	192
Circle Hot Springs	CHP	CHP		Circle Hot Springs Airport	GA	0
Clarks Point	CLP	CLP	PFCL	**Clarks Point Airport**	GA	546
Clear	Z84		PACL	Clear Airport / Clear Space Force Station	GA	0
Coffman Cove	KCC	KCC	PAKC	**Coffman Cove Seaplane Base**	GA	42
Cordova	CKU	CKU		Cordova Municipal Airport	GA	4
Council	K29	**CIL**		Council Airport	GA	0
Craig	CGA	CGA		**Craig Seaplane Base**	GA	102
Crooked Creek	CJX	**CKD**	PACJ	**Crooked Creek Airport**	GA	530
Dahl Creek	DCK	DCK	PODC	Dahl Creek Airport	GA	7
Deering	DEE	**DRG**	PADE	**Deering Airport**	GA	1,345
Diomede	DM2	**DIO**	PPDM	**Diomede Heliport** (ice runway in winter only)	GA	199
Eagle	EAA	EAA	PAEG	**Eagle Airport**	GA	622
Eek	EEK	EEK	PAEE	**Eek Airport**	GA	2,920
Egegik	EII	**EGX**	PAII	**Egegik Airport**	GA	782
Ekwok	KEK	KEK	PAAV	**Ekwok Airport**	GA	509
Elfin Cove	ELV	ELV	PAEL	**Elfin Cove Seaplane Base**	GA	459
Elim	ELI	ELI	PFEL	**Elim Airport**	GA	2,006
Excursion Inlet	EXI	EXI		**Excursion Inlet Seaplane Base**	GA	24
False Pass	KFP	KFP	PAKF	**False Pass Airport**	GA	81
Flat	FLT	FLT		Flat Airport	GA	12
Funter Bay	FNR	FNR	PANR	Funter Bay Seaplane Base	GA	18
Galbraith Lake	GBH	GBH	PAGB	Galbraith Lake Airport	GA	519
Gambell	GAM	GAM	PAGM	**Gambell Airport**	GA	2,855
Girdwood	AQY	AQY		Girdwood Airport	GA	0
Golovin	GLV	GLV	PAGL	**Golovin Airport**	GA	1,490
Goodnews Bay	GNU	GNU		**Goodnews Airport**	GA	954
Goose Bay	Z40			Goose Bay Airport	GA	0
Grayling	KGX	KGX	PAGX	**Grayling Airport**	GA	865
Gulkana	GKN	GKN	PAGK	**Gulkana Airport**	GA	367
Healy	HRR		PAHV	Healy River Airport	GA	1,625
Hollis	HYL	HYL		**Hollis Clark Bay Seaplane Base**	GA	56
Holy Cross	HCA	**HCR**	PAHC	**Holy Cross Airport**	GA	562
Hoonah	OOH		POOH	Hoonah Seaplane Base	GA	0
Hope	5HO			Hope Airport	GA	0
Hughes	HUS	HUS	PAHU	**Hughes Airport**	GA	914
Huslia	HLA	**HSL**	PAHL	**Huslia Airport**	GA	3,291
Hydaburg	HYG	HYG	PAHY	**Hydaburg Seaplane Base**	GA	1
Hyder	4Z7	**WHD**		**Hyder Seaplane Base**	GA	56
Igiugig	IGG	IGG	PAIG	**Igiugig Airport**	GA	540
Kake	KAE	KAE		**Kake Seaplane Base**	GA	0
Kaktovik / Barter Island	BTI	BTI	PABA	**Barter Island LRRS Airport** (**Kaktovik Airport**)	GA	1,941
Kalskag	KLG	KLG	PALG	**Kalskag Airport**	GA	2,524
Kaltag	KAL	KAL	PAKV	**Kaltag Airport**	GA	1,347
Kantishna	5Z5		PAAH	Kantishna Airport	GA	0
Karluk	KYK	KYK	PAKY	**Karluk Airport**	GA	244
Kasaan	KXA	KXA		Kasaan Seaplane Base	GA	2
Kasigluk	Z09	**KUK**	PFKA	**Kasigluk Airport**	GA	4,028
Ketchikan	8K9			Murphys Pullout Seaplane Base	GA	0
Kiana	IAN	IAN	PAIK	**Bob Baker Memorial Airport**	GA	2,555
King Cove	KVC	KVC	PAVC	**King Cove Airport**	GA	1,546
Kitoi Bay	KKB	KKB		**Kitoi Bay Seaplane Base**	GA	94
Kivalina	KVL	KVL	PAVL	**Kivalina Airport**	GA	3,039
Kobuk	OBU	OBU	PAOB	**Kobuk Airport**	GA	970
Kodiak	KDK	KDK	PAKD	Kodiak Municipal Airport	GA	0
Kodiak	T44			Trident Basin Seaplane Base	GA	0
Kokhanok	9K2	**KNK**	PFKK	**Kokhanok Airport**	GA	1,734
Koliganek	JZZ	**KGK**	PAJZ	**Koliganek Airport**	GA	908
Kongiganak	DUY	**KKH**	PADY	**Kongiganak Airport**	GA	3,077
Kotlik	2A9	**KOT**	PFKO	**Kotlik Airport**	GA	3,069
Koyuk	KKA	KKA	PAKK	**Koyuk Alfred Adams Airport**	GA	2,120
Koyukuk	KYU	KYU	PFKU	**Koyukuk Airport**	GA	830
Kwethluk	KWT	KWT	PFKW	Kwethluk Airport	GA	3,587
Kwigillingok	GGV	**KWK**	PAGG	**Kwigillingok Airport** (also see Kwigillingok Seaplane Base)	GA	2,534
Lake Louise	Z55		PAAO	Lake Louise Airport (also see Lake Louise Seaplane Base)	GA	0
Larsen Bay	2A3	**KLN**	PALB	**Larsen Bay Airport**	GA	2,226
Levelock	9Z8	**KLL**	PAAI	**Levelock Airport**	GA	340
Lime Village	2AK	**LVD**		Lime Village Airport	GA	57
Manley Hot Springs	MLY	MLY	PAML	**Manley Hot Springs Airport**	GA	76
Manokotak	MBA	**KMO**	PAMB	**Manokotak Airport**	GA	1,528
Marshall	MDM	**MLL**	PADM	**Marshall Don Hunter Sr. Airport**	GA	2,724
May Creek	MYK	MYK		**May Creek Airport**	GA	27
McCarthy	15Z	**MXY**	PAMX	**McCarthy Airport**	GA	150
McGrath	MCG	MCG	PAMC	**McGrath Airport** (also see McGrath Seaplane Base)	GA	2,676
Mekoryuk	MYU	MYU	PAMY	**Mekoryuk Airport**	GA	1,321
Metlakatla	MTM	MTM	PAMM	**Metlakatla Seaplane Base**	GA	569
Minto	51Z	**MNT**	PAAF	**Minto Al Wright Airport** (was Minto Airport)	GA	201
Mountain Village	MOU	MOU	PAMO	**Mountain Village Airport**	GA	3,678
Naknek	5NK	**NNK**		Naknek Airport	GA	6
Nanwalek (English Bay)	KEB	KEB	PAAW	**Nanwalek Airport** (was English Bay Airport)	GA	2,344
Napakiak	WNA	WNA	PANA	Napakiak Airport	GA	1,801
Napaskiak	PKA	PKA	PAPK	Napaskiak Airport	GA	1,604
Nelson Lagoon	OUL	**NLG**	PAOU	**Nelson Lagoon Airport**	GA	367
Nenana	ENN	ENN	PANN	Nenana Municipal Airport	GA	9
New Stuyahok	KNW	KNW	PANW	**New Stuyahok Airport**	GA	1,929
Newtok	EWU	**WWT**	PAEW	**Newtok Airport** (also see Newtok Seaplane Base)	GA	2,187
Nightmute	IGT	**NME**	PAGT	**Nightmute Airport**	GA	1,463
Nikolai	FSP	**NIB**	PAFS	**Nikolai Airport**	GA	1,648
Nondalton	5NN	**NNL**	PANO	**Nondalton Airport**	GA	1,005
Noorvik	D76	**ORV**	PFNO	**Robert (Bob) Curtis Memorial Airport**	GA	3,715
Northway	ORT	ORT	PAOR	**Northway Airport**	GA	0
Nuiqsut	AQT	**NUI**	PAQT	**Nuiqsut Airport**	GA	2,341
Nulato	NUL	NUL	PANU	**Nulato Airport**	GA	2,480
Nunam Iqua (Sheldon Pt.)	SXP	SXP	PAAU	**Sheldon Point Airport**	GA	1,291
Nunapitchuk	16A	**NUP**	PPIT	**Nunapitchuk Airport**	GA	3,329
Old Harbor	6R7	**OLH**		**Old Harbor Airport**	GA	2,299
Ophir	Z17			Ophir Airport	GA	0
Ouzinkie	4K5	**KOZ**	PAAE	**Ouzinkie Airport**	GA	1,332
Palmer	PAQ	PAQ	PAAQ	Palmer Municipal Airport	GA	3
Pedro Bay	4K0	**PDB**		**Pedro Bay Airport**	GA	704
Pelican	PEC	PEC	PPEC	**Pelican Seaplane Base**	GA	892
Perryville	PEV	**KPV**	PAPE	**Perryville Airport**	GA	616
Petersburg	63A			Lloyd R. Roundtree Seaplane Facility	GA	0
Pilot Point	PNP	**PIP**	PAPN	**Pilot Point Airport**	GA	435
Pilot Station	0AK	**PQS**	PAAC	**Pilot Station Airport**	GA	3,469
Platinum	PTU	PTU	PAPM	**Platinum Airport**	GA	505
Point Baker	KPB	KPB	PFKP	**Point Baker Seaplane Base**	GA	7
Point Lay	PIZ	PIZ	PPIZ	**Point Lay LRRS Airport**	GA	1,625
Port Alexander	AHP	**PTD**	PAAP	**Port Alexander Seaplane Base**	GA	127
Port Graham	PGM	PGM		Port Graham Airport	GA	2,275
Port Heiden	PTH	PTH	PAPH	**Port Heiden Airport**	GA	774
Port Lions	ORI	ORI	PORI	**Port Lions Airport**	GA	1,357
Port Protection	19P	**PPV**		**Port Protection Seaplane Base**	GA	27
Portage Creek	A14	**PCA**	PAOC	Portage Creek Airport	GA	0
Rampart	RMP	RMP	PFMP	**Rampart Airport**	GA	540
Red Devil	RDV	RDV		**Red Devil Airport**	GA	86
Ruby	RBY	RBY	PARY	**Ruby Airport**	GA	2,089
Russian Mission	RSH	RSH	PARS	**Russian Mission Airport**	GA	2,807
Sand Point	SDP	SDP	PASD	**Sand Point Airport**	GA	3,075
Savoonga	SVA	SVA	PASA	**Savoonga Airport**	GA	3,199
Scammon Bay	SCM	SCM	PACM	**Scammon Bay Airport**	GA	3,719
Seward	SWD	SWD	PAWD	Seward Airport	GA	9
Shageluk	SHX	SHX	PAHX	**Shageluk Airport**	GA	447
Shaktoolik	2C7	**SKK**	PFSH	**Shaktoolik Airport**	GA	1,745
Shungnak	SHG	SHG	PAGH	**Shungnak Airport**	GA	1,571
Sitka	A29			**Sitka Seaplane Base**	GA	81
Skwentna	SKW	SKW	PASW	Skwentna Airport	GA	103
Sleetmute	SLQ	SLQ	PASL	**Sleetmute Airport**	GA	530
Soldotna	SXQ	SXQ	PASX	Soldotna Airport	GA	14
South Naknek	WSN	WSN	PFWS	**South Naknek Nr 2 Airport**	GA	63
St. George	PBV	**STG**	PAPB	**St. George Airport**	GA	256
St. Michael	SMK	SMK	PAMK	**St. Michael Airport**	GA	1,866
St. Paul	SNP	SNP	PASN	**St. Paul Island Airport**	GA	1,620
Stebbins	WBB	WBB	PAAS	**Stebbins Airport**	GA	2,192
Stevens Village	SVS	SVS	PFSV	**Stevens Village Airport**	GA	266
Stony River	SRV	SRV		**Stony River 2 Airport**	GA	223
Takotna	TCT	TCT	PPCT	**Takotna Airport**	GA	371
Talkeetna	TKA	TKA	PATK	Talkeetna Airport	GA	0
Tanana	TAL	TAL	PATA	**Ralph M. Calhoun Memorial Airport**	GA	1,702
Tatitlek	7KA	**TEK**	PAKA	**Tatitlek Airport**	GA	632
Telida	2K5	**TLF**		Telida Airport	GA	0
Teller	TER	**TLA**	PATE	**Teller Airport**	GA	1,310
Tenakee Springs	TKE	TKE	PAJJ	**Tenakee Seaplane Base**	GA	495
Tetlin	3T4	TEH		Tetlin Airport	GA	0
Thorne Bay	KTB	KTB		**Thorne Bay Seaplane Base**	GS	210
Togiak Village	TOG	TOG	PATG	**Togiak Airport**	GA	3,082
Tok	6K8		PFTO	**Tok Junction Airport**	GA	407
Toksook Bay	OOK	OOK	PAOO	**Toksook Bay Airport**	GA	3,342
Tuluksak	TLT	TLT	PALT	Tuluksak Airport	GA	2,628
Tuntutuliak	A61	**WTL**	PAAJ	**Tuntutuliak Airport** (also see Tuntutuliak Seaplane Base)	GA	3,474
Tununak	4KA	**TNK**	POKA	**Tununak Airport**	GA	1,581
Twin Hills	A63	**TWA**		**Twin Hills Airport**	GA	661
Ugashik	9A8	**UGS**		Ugashik Airport	GA	81
Venetie	VEE	VEE	PAVE	**Venetie Airport**	GA	1,532
Wainwright	AWI	**AIN**	PAWI	**Wainwright Airport**	GA	3,416
Wales	IWK	**WAA**	PAIW	**Wales Airport**	GA	1,043
Wasilla	IYS	**WWA**	PAWS	Wasilla Airport	GA	7
Whale Pass	96Z	**WWP**		**Whale Pass Seaplane Float Harbor Facility**	GA	2
White Mountain	WMO	WMO	PAWM	**White Mountain Airport**	GA	1,380
Whittier	IEM		PAWR	Whittier Airport	GA	0
Willow	UUO	**WOW**	PAUO	Willow Airport (also see Willow Seaplane Base)	GA	0
Wiseman	WSM	WSM		Wiseman Airport	GA	0
Wrangell	68A			Wrangell Seaplane Base	GA	0
Yakutat	2Y3			Yakutat Seaplane Base	GA	0
				**Other public-use airports** (not listed in NPIAS)		
Akiachak	KKI	KKI		Akiachak Seaplane Base		
Aleknagik	Z33			Aleknagik Seaplane Base		
Aleknagik	Z25			Tripod Airport		
American Creek	80A			American Creek Airport		
Anchorage	A13			Bold Airport		
Anchorage	33AA			Campbell Lake Seaplane Base		
Anchorage	LHD (Note: FAA code for Lake Hood Airstrip was decommissioned and the airstrip was combined with Lake Hood Seaplane Base.)		PALH	Lake Hood Airstrip		
Annette	Z43			Tamgas Harbor Seaplane Base		
Anvik	K40			Anvik Seaplane Base		
Bartlett Cove	BQV	BQV		Bartlett Cove Seaplane Base		
Basin Creek	Z47			Basin Creek Airport		
Bear Creek	Z48	BCC		Bear Creek 3 Airport		
Bear Lake	Z52			Johnsons Landing Airport		
Bethel	Z59	JBT		Bethel Seaplane Base		
Bethel	Z58			Hangar Lake Seaplane Base		
Bettles	2A4			Vor Lake Waterlane Seaplane Base		
Big Lake	D71			Beaver Lake Seaplane Base		
Big Lake	L95			Jones Landing Seaplane Base		
Black Rapids	5BK			Black Rapids Airport		
Cantwell	TTW		PATW	Cantwell Airport		
Cape Pole	Z71	CZP		Cape Pole Seaplane Base		
Chatham	CYM	CYM		Chatham Seaplane Base		
Chernofski Harbor	KCN	KCN		Chernofski Harbor Seaplane Base		
Chignik	Z78	KBW		Chignik Bay Seaplane Base		99
Chistochina	CZO	CZO		Chistochina Airport		
Clear	CLF	CLF		Clear Sky Lodge Airport		
Clearwater	Z86			Clearwater Airport		
Cold Bay	Z87			Blinn Lake Seaplane Base		
Colorado Creek	KCR	KCR		Colorado Creek Airport		
Cooper Landing	JLA	JLA		Quartz Creek Airport		24
Copper Center	Z93	CZC		Copper Center Airport		
Craig	5C5			El Capitan Lodge Seaplane Base		
Deadhorse	4AK1			Inigok Airport		
Delta Junction	D66	DJN		Delta Junction Airport		28
Denali	0Z2			Road Commission Airport		
Dillingham	0Z3			Shannons Pond Seaplane Base		
Eagle River	D72			D&C Fire Lake Flying Club Seaplane Base		
Ellamar	1Z9	ELW		Ellamar Seaplane Base		
Entrance Island	2Z1	HBH		Entrance Island Seaplane Base		
Eureka Creek	2Z2			Eureka Creek Airport		
Eva Creek	2Z3			Eva Creek Airport		
Edna Bay		EDA		**Edna Bay Seaplane Base**		
Fairbanks	2Z5			Chena River Seaplane Base		
Fairbanks	AK7		PAAN	Gold King Creek Airport		
False Island	2Z6	FAK		False Island Seaplane Base		4
Farewell Lake	FKK		PAFK	Farewell Lake Seaplane Base		
Farewell Lake	TNW		PAFL	Tin Creek Airport		
Feather River	3Z1			Feather River Airport		
Glacier Creek	KGZ	KGZ		Glacier Creek Airport		
Golden Horn Lodge	3Z8	GDH		Golden Horn Lodge Seaplane Base		
Healy Lake		HKB		**Healy Lake Airport**		
Hogatza	2AK6	HGZ		Hog River Airport		
Homer	5BL			Homer–Beluga Lake Seaplane Base		
Horsfeld	4Z5			Horsfeld Airport		
Ivanof Bay	KIB	KIB		Ivanof Bay Seaplane Base		
Jakolof Bay	4Z9			Jakolof Bay Airport		
Jensens	AK60			Fort Jensen Airport		
Kantishna	Z90			Stampede Airport		
Karluk Lake	KKL	KKL		Karluk Lake Seaplane Base		8
Kasilof	5KS			Kasilof Airport		
Kasilof	AK5			Encelewski Lake Seaplane Base		
Kasitsna Bay	5Z7			Kasitsna Airport		
Katmai National Park	5Z9	BKF		Lake Brooks Seaplane Base		6,464
Kavik River	RK1			Kavik Strip		
Kenai	2R3			Island Lake Seaplane Base		
Ketchikan	5KE	WFB		**Ketchikan Harbor Seaplane Base**		5,798
Ketchikan	9C0			Peninsula Point Pullout Seaplane Base		
Kodiak	9Z3			Kodiak (Lilly Lake) Seaplane Base		
Koggiung	5KO			Koggiung Airport		
Kulik Lake	LKK	LKK	PAKL	Kulik Lake Airport		823
Kvichak	9Z7			Kvichak (Diamond J) Airport		
Kwigillingok	KWK	KWK		Kwigillingok Seaplane Base		
Lake Louise	13S			Lake Louise Seaplane Base		
Lawing	9Z9			Lawing Airport		
Lazy Bay	ALZ	ALZ		**Alitak Seaplane Base**		21
Livengood	4AK	LIV		Livengood Camp Airport		14
Loring	13Z	WLR		Loring Seaplane Base		
McCarthy	AK0			Jakes Bar Airport		
McGrath	16Z			McGrath Seaplane Base		
McKinley Park	INR	MCL	PAIN	McKinley National Park Airport		
Mertarvik	F02		PFME	Mertarvik Quarry Road Landing Strip		
Middleton Island	MDO	MDO	PAMD	Middleton Island Airport		5
Moose Pass	52Z			Summit Lake Seaplane Base		
Moser Bay	KMY	KMY		**Moser Bay Seaplane Base**		37
Nakeen	76Z			Nakeen Airport		
Nancy Lake	78Z			Nancy Lake Seaplane Base		
Newtok	WWT	WWT		Newtok Seaplane Base		
Nikolski	IKO	IKO	PAKO	**Nikolski Air Station**		152
Ninilchik	NIN	NIN		Ninilchik Airport		
Nome	94Z			Nome City Field		
North Pole	95Z			Bradley Sky-Ranch Airport		
Nyac	ZNC	ZNC		Nyac Airport		
Olga Bay	KOY	KOY		**Olga Bay Seaplane Base**		39
Palmer	AK1			Butte Municipal Airport		
Palmer	99Z			Finger Lake Seaplane Base		
Palmer	2D3			Gooding Lake Seaplane Base		
Paxson	PXK		PAXK	Paxson Airport		
Perry Island	PYL	PYL		Perry Island Seaplane Base		
Pilot Point	UGB	UGB		**Ugashik Bay Airport**		4
Port Alice	16K	PTC		Port Alice Seaplane Base		
Port Alsworth	05K		PAKX	Wilder Runway LLC		2,032
Port Bailey	KPY	KPY		**Port Bailey Seaplane Base**		11
Port Walter	PWR	PWR	PPWR	Port Walter Seaplane Base		
Port Williams	KPR	KPR		**Port Williams Seaplane Base**		5
Purkeypile	01A			Purkeypile Airport		17
Quail Creek	20K			Quail Creek Airport		
Quartz Creek	5QC			Quartz Creek (Kougarok) Airport		
Rainy Pass	6AK			Rainy Pass Lodge Airport		
Saginaw Bay	A23	SGW		Saginaw Seaplane Base		
Salmon Lake	Z81			Salmon Lake Airport		
San Juan / Uganik	WSJ	UGI		**San Juan (Uganik) Seaplane Base**		36
Seal Bay		SYB		**Seal Bay Seaplane Base**		
Seldovia	A27			Seldovia Seaplane Base		
Sheep Mountain	SMU	SMU	PASP	Sheep Mountain Airport		
Skagway	7K2			Skagway Seaplane Base		
Soldotna	L85			Mackeys Lakes Seaplane Base		
Squaw Harbor	36H			Squaw Harbor Seaplane Base		
Steamboat Bay	WSB	WSB	POWS	Steamboat Bay Seaplane Base		
Summit	UMM	UMM	PAST	Summit Airport		
Taku Harbor	A43			Taku Harbor Seaplane Base		1,011
Taku Lodge	TKL	TKL	PFTK	Taku Lodge Seaplane Base		
Talkeetna	AK8			Christiansen Lake Seaplane Base		
Tanacross	TSG	TSG		Tanacross Airport		23
Tatitna	8KA			Tatitna Airport		
Tazlina	Z14			Tazlina Airport		
Tazlina	5AK			Tazlina (Smokey Lake) Seaplane Base		
Thompson Pass	K55			Thompson Pass Airport		
Tokeen	57A	TKI		Tokeen Seaplane Base		
Tolsona Lake	58A			Tolsona Lake Seaplane Base		
Totatlanika River	9AK			Totatlanika River Airport		
Tuntutuliak	Z20			Tuntutuliak Seaplane Base		
Tuxekan Island	AK62	WNC		Naukati Bay Seaplane Base (was Nichin Cove Seaplane Base)		
Umiat	UMT	UMT	PAUM	Umiat Airport		69
Valdez	L93			Robe Lake Seaplane Base		
Wasilla	D75			Blodgett Lake Seaplane Base		
Wasilla	6A7			Brocker Lake Seaplane Base		
Wasilla	3H3			Cottonwood Lake Seaplane Base		
Wasilla	29A			Island Lake Seaplane Base		
Wasilla	4A3			Lake Lucille Seaplane Base		
Wasilla	4AK0			Niklason Lake Seaplane Base		
Wasilla	3A3			Seymour Lake Seaplane Base		
Wasilla	3K9			Upper Wasilla Lake Seaplane Base		
Wasilla	T66			Visnaw Lake Seaplane Base		
Wasilla	5L6			Wasilla Lake Seaplane Base		
Waterfall	KWF	KWF	POKW	Waterfall Seaplane Base		
West Point	KWP	KWP		**West Point Village Seaplane Base**		58
Willow	MFN			Minuteman Lake Seaplane Base		
Willow	2X2			Willow Seaplane Base		
Yakutat	A57			Alsek River Airport		
Yakutat	3AK			Dry Bay Airport		
Yakutat	AK76			East Alsek River Airport		
Yakutat	A67			Harlequin Lake Airport		
Yakutat	A68			Situk Airport		
Yakutat	A69			Tanis Mesa Airport		
Yankee Creek	A77			Yankee Creek Airport		
Yes Bay	78K	WYB		Yes Bay Lodge Seaplane Base		
Yukon Charley Rivers	L20			Coal Creek Airport		4
Zachar Bay		KZB		**Zachar Bay Seaplane Base**		
				**Other government/military airports**		
Anchorage	EDF	EDF	PAED	Elmendorf Air Force Base		880
Anchorage	CSR			Campbell Airstrip		
Attu Island	ATU	ATU	PAAT	Casco Cove Coast Guard Station		
Big Mountain	37AK	BMX	PABM	Big Mountain Air Force Station		
Boswell Bay	AK97	BSW		Boswell Bay Airport		
Cape Lisburne	LUR	LUR	PALU	**Cape Lisburne LRRS Airport**		72
Cape Newenham	EHM	EHM	PAEH	Cape Newenham LRRS Airport		70
Cape Romanzof	CZF	CZF	PACZ	Cape Romanzof LRRS Airport		52
Unimak Island	26AK		PACS	Cape Sarichef Airport		
Cape Spencer	CSP	CSP	PACA	Cape Spencer Coast Guard Heliport		
Candle	AK75	CDL		Candle 2 Airport		9
Delta Junction / Fort Greely	BIG	BIG	PABI	Allen Army Airfield (formerly Big Delta Army Airfield)		
Dutch Harbor	AK23		PAAM	Driftwood Bay Air Force Station Airfield		
Fairbanks	EIL	EIL	PAEI	Eielson Air Force Base		108
Five Mile	FVM	FMC	PAFV	Five Mile Airport		
Fairbanks / Fort Wainwright	FBK	FBK	PAFB	Ladd Army Airfield		44
Fort Richardson	FRN	FRN	PAFR	Bryant Army Airport		
Granite Mountain	GSZ	GMT	PAGZ	Granite Mountain Air Station		0
Indian Mountain Air Force Station	UTO	UTO	PAIM	**Indian Mountain LRRS Airport**		20
Kalakaket Creek	1KC	KKK		Kalakaket Creek Air Station		
Point Lonely	AK71	LNI	PALN	Point Lonely Short Range Radar Site (formerly FAA: LNI)		2
Port Clarence	KPC	KPC	PAPC	Port Clarence Coast Guard Station		0
Shemya	SYA	SYA	PASY	Eareckson Air Station		0
Sparrevohn	SVW	SVW	PASV	Sparrevohn LRRS Airport		0
Tatalina	TLJ	TLJ	PATL	Tatalina LRRS Airport		18
Tin City	TNC	TNC	PATC	**Tin City LRRS Airport**		91
Wainwright	AK03		PAWT	Wainwright Air Station		
				**Notable private-use airports**		
Amook Bay	AK81	AOS		**Amook Bay Seaplane Base**		36
Annette Island	ANN	ANN	PANT	Annette Island Airport		
Bear Creek	AK02			Bear Creek 1 Airport (also see Bear Creek 3 Airport)		
Bell Island	KBE	KBE		Bell Island Hot Springs Seaplane Base		0
Beluga	BLG	BVU	PABG	Beluga Airport		893
Cape Decision	CDE			Cape Decision Lighthouse Heliport (was Coast Guard Heliport)		
Cape Yakataga	0AA1	CYT		Yakataga Airport (formerly FAA: CYT, ICAO: PACY)		26
Cold Bay	1AK3	PML	PAAL	**Port Moller Airport** (formerly Port Moller Air Force Station)		249
Chena Hot Springs	AK13	CEX		Chena Hot Springs Airport		
Deadhorse	AK15		PALP	Alpine Airstrip		
Deadhorse	AK78		PABP	Badami Airport		2
Delta Junction	AK77			All West Airport		120
Delta Junction	76AK			Pogo Mine Airstrip		2
Ekuk	KKU	KKU		Ekuk Airport		
Elim	MOS			Moses Point Airport		
Fairbanks	MTF	MTX		Metro Field		235
Farewell	0AA4	FWL		Farewell Airport		0
Hannum Creek	AK74			Upper Hannum Creek Airport		
Hawk Inlet	HWI	HWI		Hawk Inlet Seaplane Base		
Herendeen Bay	AK33	HED		Herendeen Bay Airport		
Hinchinbrook Is.	2AK5		PAJO	Johnstone Point Airport		
Homer	46AK			Bear Cove Farm Airport		
Houston	80AK			Morvro Lake Seaplane Base (formerly FAA: 4K2)		
Icy Bay	19AK	ICY		Icy Bay Airport		
Kenai	3AK5	DRF		Drift River Airport		
Kuparuk	UBW	UUK	PAKU	Ugnu-Kuparuk Airport		
Lost River	AK45			Lost River 2 Airport (also see Lost River 1 Airport)		
McGrath	AK40			Nixon Fork Mine Airport		11
Nabesna	IBN		PABN	Devils Mountain Lodge Airport		
Nanwalek	AK07			Dog Fish Bay Airport		
Napaimute	4AK8			Napaimute Pioneer Airfield		
Nikiski	AK11			High Vista Airport		
Port Alsworth	TPO	PTA	PALJ	**Port Alsworth Airport**		2,775
Red Dog Mine	DGG	RDB	PADG	Red Dog Airport (formerly FAA: AED, ICAO: PARD)		15,159
Russian Mission	9AK2			Kako Airport		
Selawik	8AK3			Roland Norton Memorial Airstrip (formerly FAA: 91A)		
Slana	DDT			Duffy's Tavern Airport		
Talkeetna	AK44			Talkeetna Airstrip		
Taylor	AK49	TWE		Taylor Airport		
Tikchik	AK56	KTH		Tikchik Lodge Seaplane Base		
Trading Bay	5AK0			Trading Bay Production Airport		283
Tok	8AK9			Tok 2 Airport		
Tyonek	TYE	TYE		Tyonek Airport		1,261
				**Notable former airports**		
Cape Beaufort	~~Z53~~			Cape Sabine Airport (closed 2008?)		
Chignik	~~KCG~~	~~KCG~~		Chignik Fisheries Airport (closed)		
Egegik	~~AK96~~	~~BSZ~~		Bartletts Airport (closed 2008)		
Eureka	~~AZK~~		~~PAZK~~	Skelton Airport (closed)		
Gunsight Mountain Lodge	~~A88~~			Gunsight Mountain Airport (closed)		
Haycock	~~HAY~~	~~HAY~~		Haycock Airport (closed 2008?)		
Kaktovik	8AK7		PABU	Bullen Point Air Force Station		
Kenai	~~6Z1~~			Arness Lake Airport (closed)		
Lost River	~~LSR~~	~~LSR~~		Lost River 1 Airport (closed 2009)		
Myrtle Creek	~~60Z~~			Myrtle Creek Airport (closed)		
Pauloff Harbor (Sanak Is.)	~~KPH~~	~~KPH~~		Pauloff Harbor Seaplane Base (closed)		
Point McIntyre	~~AK11~~			Point McIntyre Airport (abandoned 1963)		
Porcupine Creek	~~PCK~~	~~PCK~~		Porcupine Creek Airport (closed 2009?)		
Oliktok Point	~~OLI~~		~~POLI~~	Oliktok LRRS Airport (closed)		
Sagwon	~~SAG~~	~~SAG~~		Sagwon Airport (closed)		
South Naknek	~~3AK~~			PAF Cannery Airport (Pacific American Fisheries) (closed)		
Sutton	~~JVM~~		~~PAJV~~	Jonesville Mine Airport (closed)		
Tahneta Pass Lodge	~~HNE~~	~~HNE~~	~~PAHE~~	Tahneta Pass Airport (closed)		
Tok	~~TKJ~~	~~TKJ~~	~~PATJ~~	Tok Airport (closed)		
Umnak Island				Fort Glenn Army Airfield (closed)		
Yakutat	~~A70~~			Dangerous River Airport (closed)		

Footnotes:

== See also ==
- List of airlines in Alaska
- List of airports by ICAO code: P#PA PF PO PP - Alaska
- Wikipedia: WikiProject Aviation/Airline destination lists: North America#Alaska

== Sources ==
Federal Aviation Administration (FAA):

- FAA Airport Data (Form 5010) from National Flight Data Center (NFDC), also available from AirportIQ 5010
- National Plan of Integrated Airport Systems (2021–2025), released 2021
- Passenger Boarding (Enplanement) Data for CY 2019 and 2020, Updated November 8, 2021
- Passenger Boarding (Enplanement) Data for CY 2023 and 2024, Updated September 2025
- FAA Order JO 7350.8U – Location Identifiers, effective September 20, 2012
- Alaskan Region Airports Division
- Alaska Flight Services Information Area Group
- FAI FSS – Airport Photographs

Alaska Department of Transportation & Public Facilities (DOT&PF):

- DOT&PF Aviation & Airports
- Public Airports in Alaska
- "Map of public airports in Alaska (updated 2013)" (PDF).

Other sites used as a reference when compiling and updating this list:

- "Airline and Airport Code Search". International Air Transport Association (IATA). – used to check IATA airport codes
- Aviation Safety Network – used to check IATA airport codes
- AirNav.com: Airports in Alaska – used to check ICAO airport codes
- Great Circle Mapper: Airports in Alaska – used to check IATA and ICAO airport codes
- Abandoned & Little-Known Airfields: Alaska – used for information on former airports
