= Beaver Airport (disambiguation) =

Beaver Airport may refer to:

- Beaver Airport in Beaver, Alaska, United States (FAA/IATA: WBQ)
- Beaver Municipal Airport (Oklahoma) in Beaver, Oklahoma, United States (FAA: K44)
- Beaver Municipal Airport (Utah) in Beaver, Utah, United States (FAA: U52)

== See also ==
- Beaver County Airport in Beaver Falls, Pennsylvania, United States (FAA: BVI, IATA: BFP)
- Beaver Island Airport in Beaver Island, Michigan, United States (FAA: SJX)
- Welke Airport in Beaver Island, Michigan, United States (FAA: 6Y8)
- Beaver Marsh State Airport in Beaver Marsh, Oregon, United States (FAA: 2S2)
- Beaver Lake Seaplane Base in Big Lake, Alaska, United States (FAA: D71)
- Bear Creek 3 Airport in Beaver Creek, Alaska, United States (FAA: Z48, IATA: BCC)
- Beaver Creek Airport in Beaver Creek, Yukon, Canada (IATA: YXQ)
