= Ophir Airport =

- IATA: none; ICAO: none; FAA LID: Z17

Summary
- Airport type: Public
- Owner: State of Alaska DOT&PF
- Serves: Ophir, Alaska
- Elevation AMSL: 575 ft / 175 m
- Coordinates: 63°08′46″N 156°31′48″W

Map
- Location of airport in Alaska

Runways
Direction	Length		Surface
Direction	ft	m	Surface
11/29	1,940	591	Turf/gravel
- Source: Federal Aviation Administration

Ophir Airport (FAA LID: Z17) is a state-owned public-use airport located in Ophir, in the Yukon-Koyukuk Census Area of the U.S. state of Alaska.

This airport is included in the FAA's National Plan of Integrated Airport Systems for 2011–2015 which categorized it as a general aviation facility.

== Facilities and aircraft ==
Ophir Airport has one runway designated 11/29 with a turf and gravel surface measuring 1,940 by 60 feet (591 x 18 m).

== See also ==
- List of airports in Alaska
