= Clear Sky Lodge Airport =

Airport in Alaska, United States

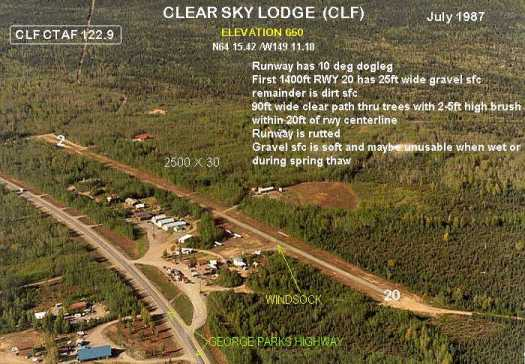
- IATA: none; ICAO: none; FAA LID: CLF

Summary
- Airport type: Public
- Owner: Clear Sky Lodge Bar and Grill
- Serves: Clear, Alaska
- Elevation AMSL: 650 ft (200 m)
- Coordinates: 64°15′25″N 149°11′11″W

Map
- Location of airport in Alaska

Runways
Direction	Length		Surface
Direction	ft	m	Surface
2/20	2,500	762	Gravel/dirt

Statistics (2005)
- Aircraft operations: 800
- Source: Federal Aviation Administration

Clear Sky Lodge Airport (FAA LID: CLF) is a public-use airport located four nautical miles (7 km) south of the central business district of Clear, Alaska, United States. This airport is privately owned by Rabideau's Clear Sky Lodge.

CLF is not the IATA code for that airport; CLF has been assigned by IATA to the Coltishall military airbase in England, now closed.

== Facilities and aircraft ==
Clear Sky Lodge Airport has one runway designated 2/20 with a 2,500 by 20 ft (762 x 6 m) gravel and dirt surface. For 12-month period ending December 31, 2005, the airport had 800 aircraft operations, an average of 66 per month, all of which were general aviation.

== See also ==
- Clear Airport (FAA: Z84, ICAO: PACL)
- List of airports in Alaska
