= Summit Airport =

Summit Airport may refer to:

- Summit Airport (Alaska) in Summit, Alaska, United States (FAA/IATA: UMM)
- Summit Airport (Delaware) in Middletown, Delaware, United States (FAA: EVY)
