= DJN =

DJN or djn may refer to:

- Delta Junction Airport, Alaska, United States; by IATA code
- Jawoyn language, Arnhem Land, Australia; by ISO 639-3 code
