= Skagway Seaplane Base =

- IATA: none; ICAO: none; FAA LID: 7K2

Summary
- Airport type: Public
- Operator: State of Alaska DOT&PF - Southeast Region
- Serves: Skagway, Alaska
- Elevation AMSL: 0 ft / 0 m
- Coordinates: 59°26′49″N 135°19′22″W

Map
- Location of airport in Alaska

Runways
Direction	Length		Surface
Direction	ft	m	Surface
4/22	2,000	610	Water

Statistics (2006)
- Aircraft operations: 250
- Source: Federal Aviation Administration

Skagway Seaplane Base (FAA LID: 7K2) is a state-owned public-use seaplane base located in Skagway, Alaska. It is included in the National Plan of Integrated Airport Systems for 2011–2015, which categorized it as a general aviation facility.

== Facilities and aircraft ==
Skagway Seaplane Base has one seaplane landing area designated 4/22 which measures 2,000 by 2,000 feet (610 x 610 m). For the 12-month period ending December 31, 2006, the airport had 250 aircraft operations, an average of 20 per month: 80% general aviation and 20% air taxi.

== See also ==
- Skagway Airport
- List of airports in Alaska
