= Copper Center Airport =

Copper Center Airport Copper Center 2 Airport
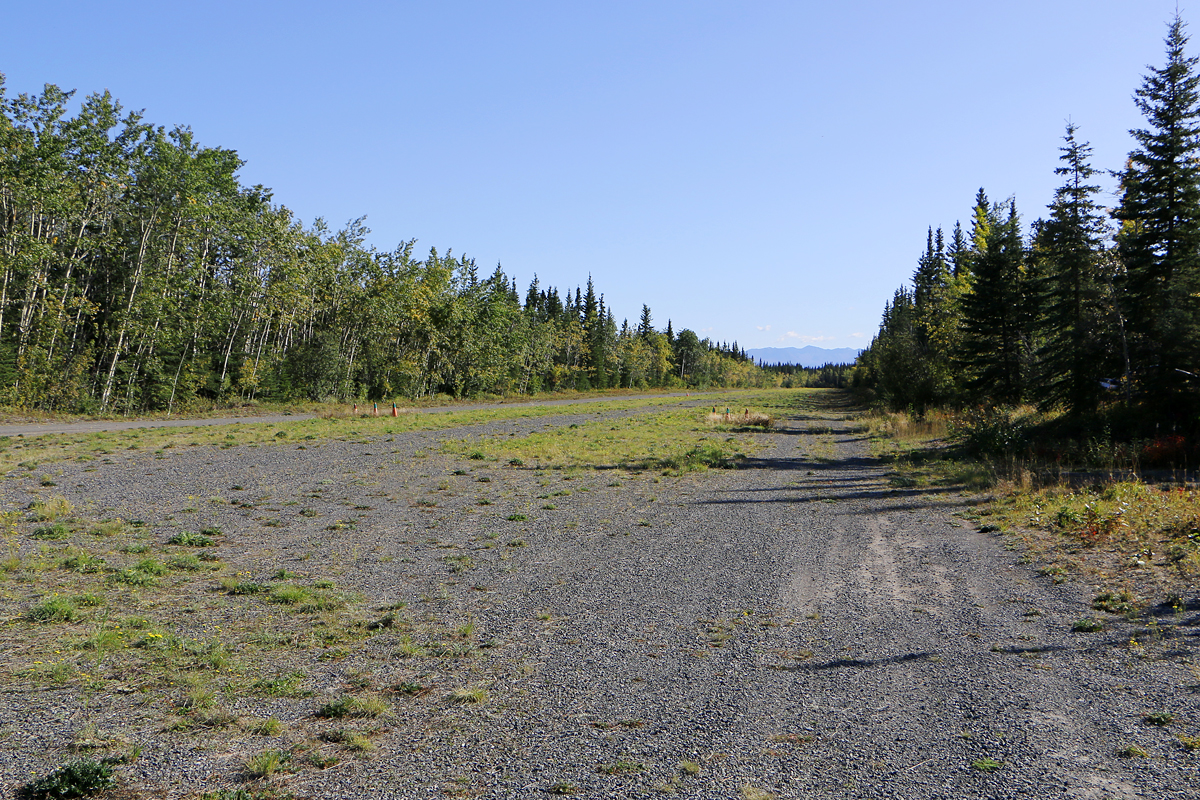
- IATA: CZC; ICAO: none; FAA LID: Z93

Summary
- Airport type: Public
- Owner: State of Alaska DOT&PF - Northern Region
- Serves: Copper Center, Alaska
- Elevation AMSL: 1,150 ft (350 m)
- Coordinates: 61°56′28″N 145°17′39″W

Map
- Location of airport in Alaska

Runways
Direction	Length		Surface
Direction	ft	m	Surface
13/31	2,200	671	Gravel

Statistics (2005)
- Aircraft operations: 1,200
- Based aircraft: 7
- Source: Federal Aviation Administration

Copper Center Airport (IATA: CZC, FAA LID: Z93), also known as Copper Center 2 Airport, is a state-owned public-use airport located one nautical mile (2 km) south of the central business district of Copper Center, in the Copper River Census Area of the U.S. state of Alaska, United States.

== Facilities and aircraft ==
Copper Center Airport has one runway designated 13/31 with a gravel surface measuring 2,200 by 55 feet (671 x 17 m).

For the 12-month period ending December 31, 2005, the airport had 1,200 aircraft operations, an average of 100 per month: 92% general aviation and 8% air taxi. At that time there were seven aircraft based at this airport, all single-engine.

== See also ==
- List of airports in Alaska
