= Portage Creek Airport =

- IATA: none; ICAO: PAOC; FAA LID: A14

Summary
- Airport type: Public
- Owner: State of Alaska DOT&PF - Central Region
- Serves: Portage Creek, Alaska
- Elevation AMSL: 129 ft / 39 m
- Coordinates: 58°54′23″N 157°42′40″W

Map
- Location of airport in Alaska

Runways
Direction	Length		Surface
Direction	ft	m	Surface
10/28	1,920	585	Gravel/dirt
1/19	1,470	448	Gravel/dirt

Statistics (2007)
- Aircraft operations: 700
- Source: Federal Aviation Administration

Portage Creek Airport (IATA: PCA, ICAO: PAOC, FAA LID: A14) is a state-owned public-use airport in Portage Creek, located in the Dillingham Census Area of the U.S. state of Alaska. This airport is included in the FAA's National Plan of Integrated Airport Systems for 2011–2015, which categorized it as a general aviation airport.

== Facilities and aircraft ==
Portage Creek Airport has two runways with gravel/dirt surfaces: 10/28 is 1,920 by 60 feet (585 x 18 m) and 1/19 is 1,470 by 60 feet (448 x 18 m). For the 12-month period ending December 31, 2007, the airport had 700 air taxi aircraft operations, an average of 58 per month.

== See also ==
- List of airports in Alaska
