= NNK (disambiguation) =

NNK may refer to:

- NNK, one of the key tobacco-specific nitrosamines derived from nicotine
- nnk, the ISO 639-3 code for Nankina language
- Naknek Airport, the IATA code NNK
- Nemzeti Népegészségügyi Központ, a Hungarian centralised government health agency
- Northern Neck, the northernmost of Virginia's three peninsulas

== See also ==
- NNK Rugby Stadium, a multi-use stadium in South Africa
