= HNH =

HNH may refer to:

- Herne Hill railway station, London
- Hoonah Airport, in Alaska
- Hope not Hate, a British advocacy group
- Khwe language
- HNH International, the parent company of Naxos Records
