= JVM (disambiguation) =

A JVM is a Java virtual machine.

JVM may also refer to:

- any particular JVM named "JVM"; see List of Java virtual machines (list of JVMs)
- Jharkhand Vikas Morcha (Prajatantrik), a state political party in the Indian state of Jharkhand in India
- Jonesville Mine Airport (FAA LID code JVM), Matanuska-Susitna Borough, Alaska
- JVM, a music amplifier product line developed by Marshall Amplification, a British/Swedish music equipment company

== See also ==
- List of JVM languages, list of programming languages that produced compiled Java bytecode compatible with JVMs
