= PAOH =

Paoh may refer to:

- Hoonah Airport, Hoonah, Alaska
- Pa'O people, an ethnic group in Burma
