= TKI =

TKI may refer to:

- Tyrosine kinase inhibitor, a pharmaceutical drug
- McKinney National Airport (FAA LID code), McKinney, Texas, US
- Tokeen Seaplane Base (IATA code), Alaska, US
- Thomas–Kilmann Conflict Mode Instrument, a conflict style inventory
- Turkish Coal Operations Authority (TKİ, Türkiye Kömür İşletmeleri Kurumu)
