= Seldovia Airport =

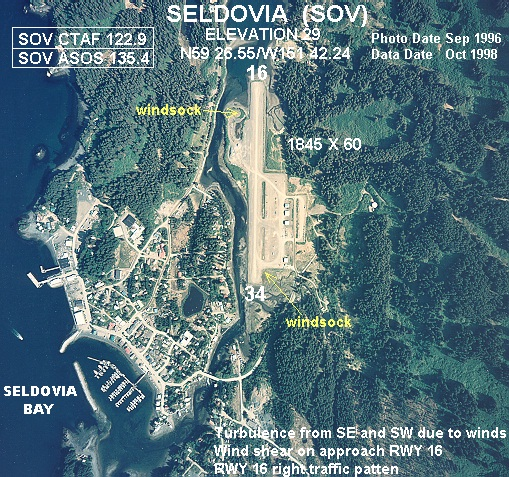
- IATA: SOV; ICAO: PASO; FAA LID: SOV

Summary
- Airport type: Public
- Operator: State of Alaska DOT&PF
- Location: Seldovia, Alaska
- Elevation AMSL: 29 ft / 9 m
- Coordinates: 59°26′33″N 151°42′15″W

Map
- Location of airport in Alaska

Runways
Direction	Length		Surface
Direction	ft	m	Surface
16/34	1,845	562	Gravel

Statistics (2005)
- Aircraft operations: 5,660
- Based aircraft: 15
- Source: Federal Aviation Administration

Seldovia Airport is a public-use gravel airstrip serving Seldovia, Alaska, about 15 miles (27 km) south-southwest from the fishing town of Homer at the Kenai Peninsula's "end of the road." The two towns are separated by Kachemak Bay, a blue-water arm of the North Pacific Ocean's Gulf of Alaska. Known to pilots as "Seldovia" (or more formally, (IATA: SOV, ICAO: PASO, FAA LID: SOV)), this public airport is located less than a half-mile (2 km) northeast of the small boat harbor serving Seldovia in the Kenai Peninsula Borough, Alaska, United States. This airport is publicly owned by the State of Alaska Department of Transportation and Public Facilities (DOT&PF) - Central Region. A two-lane gravel street named Airport Avenue leads about a half-mile (1 km) from the airport to the center of Seldovia at the Small Boat Harbor, which is surrounded by several cafes, businesses, and small hotels.

== Facilities and aircraft ==
Seldovia Airport covers an area of 177 acres (72 ha) which contains one gravel runway (16/34) measuring 1,845 by 60 ft (562 by 18 m).

For the 12-month period ending December 31, 2005, the airport had 5,660 aircraft operations, an average of 15 per day: 62% general aviation and 38% air taxi.

There are 15 aircraft based at this airport, 14 of which are single engine and one multi-engine.

== See also ==
- List of airports in Alaska
