= Funter Bay Seaplane Base =

- IATA: FNR; ICAO: PANR; FAA LID: FNR

Summary
- Airport type: Public
- Owner: State of Alaska DOT&PF - Southeastern Region
- Serves: Funter Bay, Alaska
- Elevation AMSL: 0 ft (0 m)
- Coordinates: 58°15′16″N 134°53′52″W

Map
- Location of airport in Alaska

Runways
Direction	Length		Surface
Direction	ft	m	Surface
NE/SW	10,500	3,200	Water

Statistics (2006)
- Aircraft operations: 150
- Source: Federal Aviation Administration

Funter Bay Seaplane Base (IATA: FNR, ICAO: PANR, FAA LID: FNR) is a state owned, public use seaplane base located in Funter Bay, in the Hoonah-Angoon Census Area of the U.S. state of Alaska. It is included in the National Plan of Integrated Airport Systems for 2015–2019, which categorized it as a general aviation airport based on 30 enplanements in 2012.

== Facilities and aircraft ==
Funter Bay Seaplane Base has one seaplane landing area designated NE/SW with a water surface measuring 10,500 by 500 feet (3,200 x 152 m). For the 12-month period ending December 31, 2006, the airport had 150 aircraft operations, an average of 12 per month: 50% air taxi and 50% general aviation.

== See also ==
- List of airports in Alaska

== Other sources ==
- Essential Air Service documents (Docket DOT-OST-1997-3134) from the U.S. Department of Transportation:
  - Order 2004-7-21 (July 22, 2004): re-selects Ward Air, Inc. to provide essential air service at Chatham and Funter Bay, Alaska, for the period December 1, 2003 through September 30, 2006, at an annual subsidy of $12,865.
  - Order 2006-9-16 (September 18, 2006): re-selecting Ward Air, Inc., to continue to provide subsidized essential air service (EAS) at Chatham and Funter Bay, Alaska, and setting an annual subsidy rate of $15,040 for a new two-year term beginning October 1, 2006, through September 30, 2008.
  - Order 2008-6-27 (June 19, 2008): re-selecting Ward Air, Inc., to provide subsidized essential air service (EAS) at the communities of Chatham and Funter Bay, Alaska, for the two-year period beginning October 1, 2008, at an annual subsidy of $17,280 with 3-seat Cessna C-185, 4-seat Cessna C-206, or 6-seat DeHavilland DHC-2 Beaver single-engine, amphib-float equipped aircraft.
  - Order 2010-7-11 (July 15, 2010): re-selecting Ward Air, Inc., to provide essential air service (EAS) at Chatham and Funter Bay, Alaska, at annual subsidy rates of $6,311 at Chatham and $13,273 at Funter Bay, from October 1, 2010, through September 30, 2012.
  - Order 2012-9-2 (September 4, 2012): re-selecting Ward Air, Inc., to provide Essential Air Service (EAS) at Chatham and Funter Bay, Alaska, at annual subsidies of $11,040 at Chatham and $12,896 at Funter Bay, from October 1, 2012, through September 30, 2013; and $11,472 at Chatham and $13,416 at Funter Bay, from October 1, 2013, through September 30, 2014.
