= Napakiak Airport =

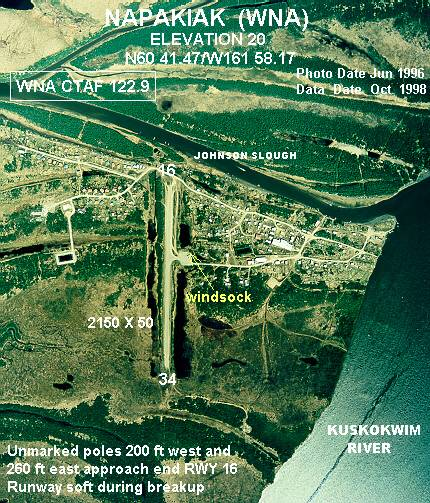
- IATA: WNA; ICAO: PANA; FAA LID: WNA

Summary
- Airport type: Public
- Owner: State of Alaska DOT&PF - Central Region
- Serves: Napakiak, Alaska
- Elevation AMSL: 17 ft / 5 m
- Coordinates: 60°41′25″N 161°58′43″W

Map
- Location of airport in Alaska

Runways
Direction	Length		Surface
Direction	ft	m	Surface
16/34	3,248	990	Gravel

Statistics
- Enplanements (2008): 1,840
- Source: Federal Aviation Administration

Napakiak Airport (IATA: WNA, ICAO: PANA, FAA LID: WNA) is a state-owned, public-use airport located in Napakiak, a city in the Bethel Census Area of the U.S. state of Alaska.

As per Federal Aviation Administration records, Napakiak Airport had 1,840 passenger boardings (enplanements) in calendar year 2008, an increase of 0.7% from the 1,828 enplanements in 2007. Napakiak Airport is included in the FAA's National Plan of Integrated Airport Systems (2009–2013), which categorizes it as a general aviation facility.

== Facilities ==
Napakiak Airport has one runway designated 16/34 with a gravel surface measuring 3,248 by 60 feet (990 x 18 m). The airport is unattended.

Remarks:

- Runway 16/34 south 1500-feet 6-inch dips.
- Activate rotating beacon - CTAF
- Activate MIRL runway 16/34, REIL runways 16 & 34 - CTAF.
- Seaplane Base operated in river; Johnson Slough unusable.
- Runway condition not monitored; recommend visual inspection prior to using.
- Windsock unreliable.
- Weather camera available on internet at https://web.archive.org/web/20090831040305/http://akweathercams.faa.gov/
- This airport has been surveyed by the National Geodetic Survey.
- Seaplane Base ASP: established prior to 1959.

== See also ==
- List of airports in Alaska
