= Willow Airport =

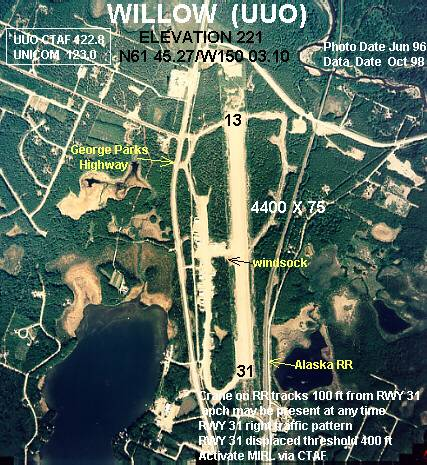
- IATA: WOW; ICAO: PAUO; FAA LID: UUO

Summary
- Airport type: Public
- Owner: Alaska DOT&PF - Central Region
- Serves: Willow, Alaska
- Elevation AMSL: 221 ft / 67 m
- Coordinates: 61°45′15″N 150°03′06″W

Map
- Location of airport in Alaska

Runways
Direction	Length		Surface
Direction	ft	m	Surface
13/31	4,400	1,341	Gravel

Statistics (2005)
- Aircraft operations: 7,700
- Based aircraft: 21
- Enplanements (2008): 2,703
- Source: Federal Aviation Administration

Willow Airport (IATA: WOW, ICAO: PAUO, FAA LID: UUO) is a state-owned, public-use airport located one nautical mile (1.85 km) northwest of the central business district of Willow, in the Matanuska-Susitna Borough of the U.S. state of Alaska. It is located across the road from Willow Lake and the Willow Seaplane Base (ICAO: 2X2).

As per Federal Aviation Administration records, Willow Airport had 2,703 passenger boardings (enplanements) in calendar year 2008, an increase of 33% from the 2,025 enplanements in 2007. Willow Airport is included in the FAA's National Plan of Integrated Airport Systems (2009-2013), which categorizes it as a general aviation facility.

Although most U.S. airports use the same three-letter location identifier for the FAA and IATA, Willow Airport is assigned UUO by the FAA and WOW by the IATA.

== Facilities and aircraft ==
Willow Airport covers an area of 610 acres (250 ha) at an elevation of 221 feet (67 m) above mean sea level. It has one runway designated 13/31 with a gravel surface measuring 4,400 by 75 feet (1,341 x 23 m). The airport is unattended.

For the 12-month period ending December 31, 2005, the airport had 7,700 aircraft operations, an average of 21 per day: 78% general aviation, 19% air taxi and 3% military. At that time there were 21 aircraft based at this airport: 90% single-engine, 5% multi-engine and 5% helicopter.

Remarks:

- Runway 13 non-standard markings; threshold marked with flexible reflective markers & cones.
- Runway 31 non-standard markings; displaced threshold marked with reflective markers & cones.
- Runway 31 approach slope 20:1 to displaced threshold.
- Credit card self serve fuel available 24 hours.
- Activate rotating beacon - CTAF.
- Activate MIRL runway 13/31 - CTAF.
- Runway condition not monitored; recommend visual inspection prior to using.
- Float planes on Willow Lake across road.
- When available weather reports hourly only.

== See also ==
- List of airports in Alaska
