= Gold King Creek Airport =

- IATA: none; ICAO: PAAN; FAA LID: AK7

Summary
- Airport type: Public
- Owner: State of Alaska DOT&PF
- Serves: Fairbanks, Alaska
- Elevation AMSL: 1,720 ft (520 m)
- Coordinates: 64°11′53″N 147°55′43″W

Map
- Location of airport in Alaska

Runways
Direction	Length		Surface
Direction	ft	m	Surface
9/27	2,558	780	Gravel/dirt

Statistics (2005)
- Aircraft operations: 50
- Source: Federal Aviation Administration

Gold King Creek Airport (ICAO: PAAN, FAA LID: AK7) is a public-use airport located at 64°11′53″N 147°55′43″W. It is 39 nautical miles (45 mi, 72 km) southeast of Fairbanks, Alaska, and is owned by the State of Alaska DOT&PF.

== Facilities and aircraft ==
Gold King Creek Airport covers an area of 30 acres (12 ha) at an elevation of 1,720 feet (524 m) above mean sea level. It has one runway designated 9/27 with a gravel and dirt surface measuring 2,558 by 17 feet (780 x 5 m). For the 12-month period ending December 31, 2005, the airport had 50 general aviation aircraft operations, an average of 4 per month.

== See also ==
- List of airports in Alaska
