= Z90 =

Z90 may refer to:

- EF50 vacuum tube (alternate name Z90)
- IXUS Z90 camera
- Stampede Airport (airport designation Z90)
