= SGW =

SGW may refer to:

- Saginaw Seaplane Base, in Alaska
- ISO 639-3 code for the Sebat Bet Gurage language, a Gurage language spoken in Ethiopia
- Serving Gateway, in the System Architecture Evolution standard
- JR East station code for Shinagawa Station
- Postal code for Siġġiewi, Malta
- Signaling gateway
- Sloan Great Wall, a cosmic structure
- Sniper: Ghost Warrior, a video game series by CI Games
- Soft Ground Wrestling, an Ugandan professional wrestling promotion
- Sons of Gwalia, a defunct Australian mining firm
- Stargate Worlds, an unreleased video game
