= Dahl Creek Airport =

- IATA: DCK; ICAO: PODC; FAA LID: DCK

Summary
- Airport type: Public
- Owner: State of Alaska DOT&PF - Northern Region
- Serves: Dahl Creek, Alaska
- Elevation AMSL: 260 ft (79 m)
- Coordinates: 66°56′36″N 156°54′17″W

Map
- Location of airport in Alaska

Runways
Direction	Length		Surface
Direction	ft	m	Surface
8/26	4,780	1,457	Gravel
- Source: Federal Aviation Administration

Dahl Creek Airport (IATA: DCK, ICAO: PODC, FAA LID: DCK) is a state owned, public use airport located 10 nautical miles (19 km) southeast of Dahl Creek, in the Northwest Arctic Borough of the U.S. state of Alaska.

The National Plan of Integrated Airport Systems for 2011–2015 categorized it as a general aviation facility. As per the Federal Aviation Administration records, this airport had 92 passenger boardings (enplanements) in calendar year 2008, 10 enplanements in 2009, and 51 in 2010.

== Facilities ==
Dahl Creek Airport covers an area of 13 acres (5 ha) at an elevation of 260 feet (79 m) above mean sea level. It has one runway designated 8/26 with a gravel surface measuring 4,780 by 75 feet (1,457 x 23 m).

== See also ==
- List of airports in Alaska
