= Lake Louise Airport =

Airport in Alaska, US

- IATA: none; ICAO: PAAO; FAA LID: Z55

Summary
- Airport type: Public
- Owner: Alaska DOT&PF - Northern Region
- Serves: Lake Louise, Alaska
- Elevation AMSL: 2,450 ft (750 m)
- Coordinates: 62°17′37″N 146°34′46″W

Map
- Location of airport in Alaska

Runways
Direction	Length		Surface
Direction	ft	m	Surface
12/30	700	213	Gravel/turf
- Source: Federal Aviation Administration

Lake Louise Airport (ICAO: PAAO, FAA LID: Z55) is a state-owned public-use airport located one nautical mile (2 km) northeast of the central business district of Lake Louise, in the Matanuska-Susitna Borough of the U.S. state of Alaska.

This airport is included in the FAA's National Plan of Integrated Airport Systems for 2011–2015 which categorized it as a general aviation facility.

== Facilities ==
Lake Louise Airport has one runway designated 12/30 with a gravel and turf surface measuring 700 by 18 feet (213 by 5 m).

== See also ==
- List of airports in Alaska
