= NKI =

NKI can refer to:

- Nathan Kline Institute for Psychiatric Research
- Early name for Nash Metropolitan
- Nederlands Kanker Instituut, Dutch Cancer research institute
- The IATA code for Naukati Bay Seaplane Base
