= Lloyd R. Roundtree Seaplane Facility =

- IATA: none; ICAO: none; FAA LID: 63A

Summary
- Airport type: Public
- Owner: State of Alaska DOT&PF - Southeast Region
- Serves: Petersburg, Alaska
- Elevation AMSL: 0 ft / 0 m
- Coordinates: 56°48′41″N 132°57′36″W

Map
- Location of airport in Alaska

Runways
Direction	Length		Surface
Direction	ft	m	Surface
NE/SW	9,000	2,743	Water

Statistics (1995)
- Aircraft operations: 7,900
- Source: Federal Aviation Administration

Lloyd R. Roundtree Seaplane Facility Seaplane Base (FAA LID: 63A) is a state-owned public-use seaplane base located in Petersburg, a city in the Petersburg Borough of the U.S. state of Alaska.

== Facilities and aircraft ==
Lloyd R. Roundtree Seaplane Facility has one landing area (NE/SW) measuring 9,000 x 1,100 feet (2,743 x 335 m). For the 12-month period ending August 6, 1995, the airport had 7,900 aircraft operations, an average of 21 per day: 75% air taxi and 25% general aviation.

== See also ==
- List of airports in Alaska
