= Butte Airport =

Butte Airport may refer to:

- Bert Mooney Airport (IATA: BTM, ICAO: KBTM, FAA LID: BTM), serving Butte, Montana
- Butte Municipal Airport (FAA LID: AK1), serving Butte, Alaska
