= K29 =

K29 may refer to:

- K-29 (Kansas highway)
- Council Airport, in Alaska
- HMS Tulip (K29), a corvette of the Royal Navy
- K-29 trailer, part of the SCR-277 radio navigation system
- Kevlar K-29, a grade of Kevlar
- Sonata in D, K. 29, by Wolfgang Amadeus Mozart
