= Skagway Airport =

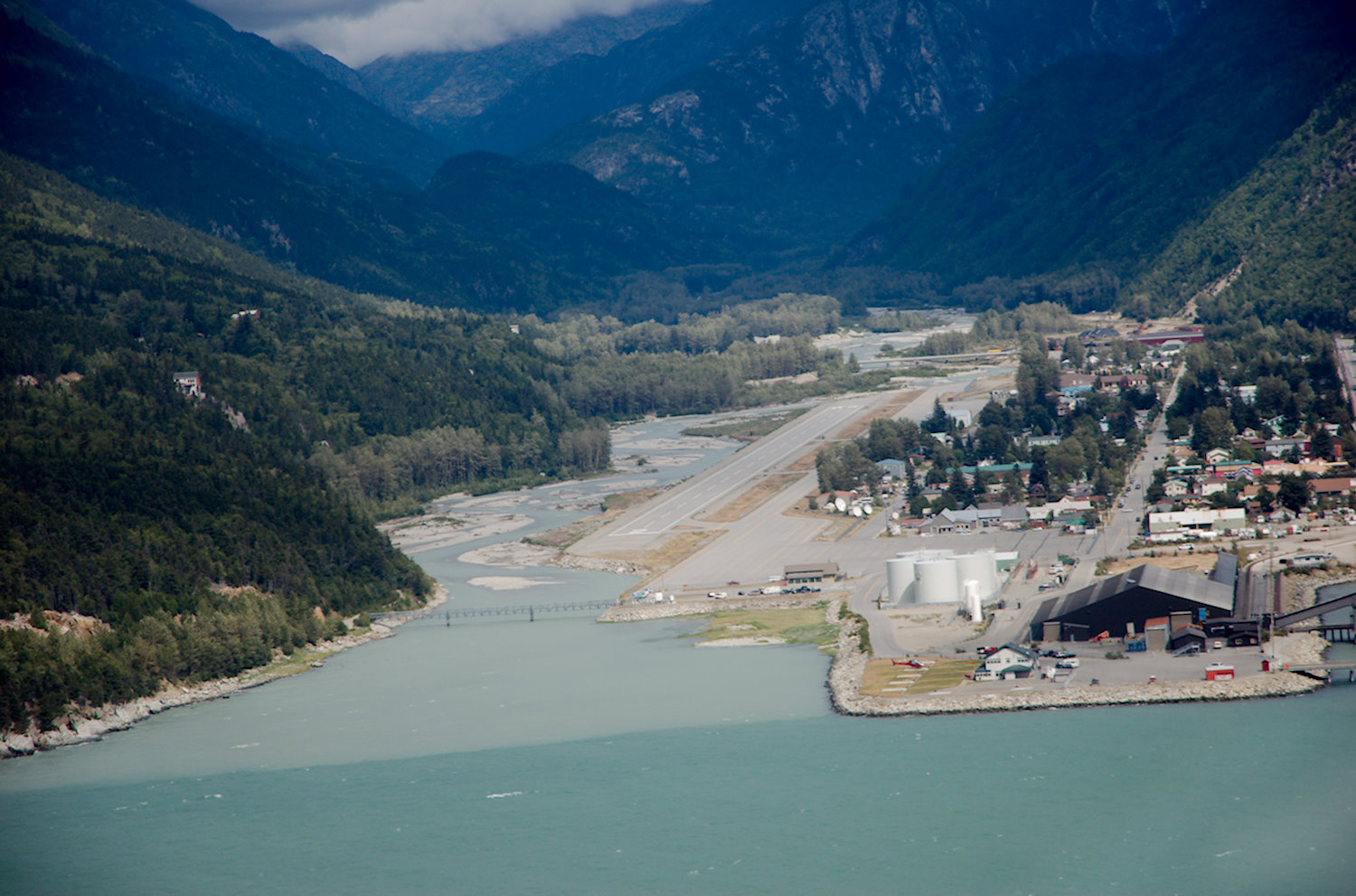
- IATA: SGY; ICAO: PAGY; FAA LID: SGY; WMO: 70362

Summary
- Airport type: Public
- Operator: State of Alaska DOT&PF - Southeast Region
- Serves: Skagway, Alaska
- Elevation AMSL: 44 ft / 13 m
- Coordinates: 59°27′36″N 135°18′56″W

Map
- Location of airport in Alaska

Runways
Direction	Length		Surface
Direction	ft	m	Surface
2/20	3,550	1,082	Asphalt

Statistics (2006)
- Aircraft operations: 12,500
- Source: Federal Aviation Administration

Skagway Airport (IATA: SGY, ICAO: PAGY, FAA LID: SGY) is a state-owned public-use airport in the city of Skagway, Alaska.

This airport is included in the National Plan of Integrated Airport Systems for 2015–2019, which categorized it as a nonprimary commercial service airport based on 7,532 enplanements in 2012. As per Federal Aviation Administration records, the airport had 10,727 passenger boardings (enplanements) in calendar year 2008, 6,468 enplanements in 2009, and 8,531 in 2010.

== Facilities and aircraft ==
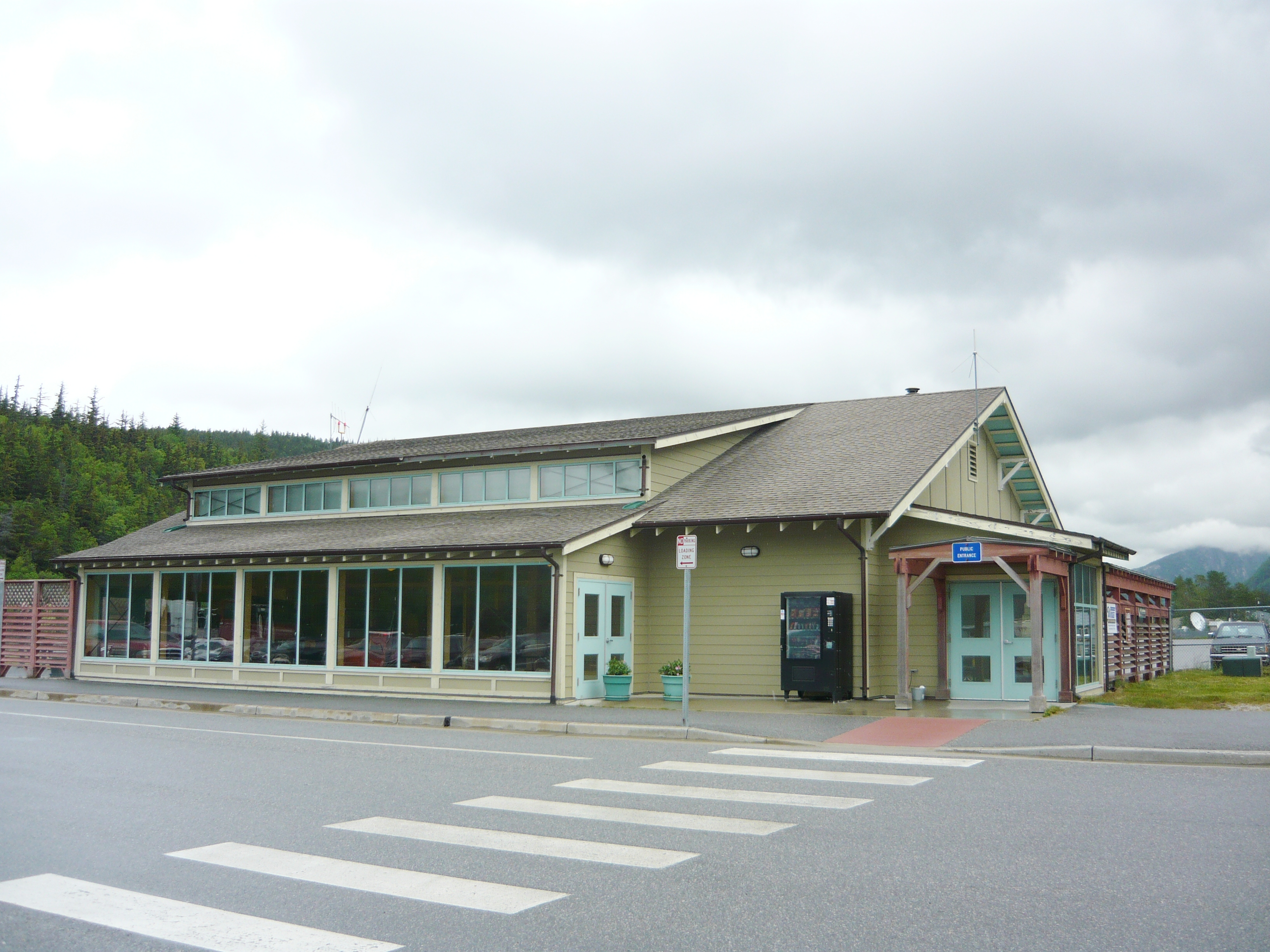
Terminal building

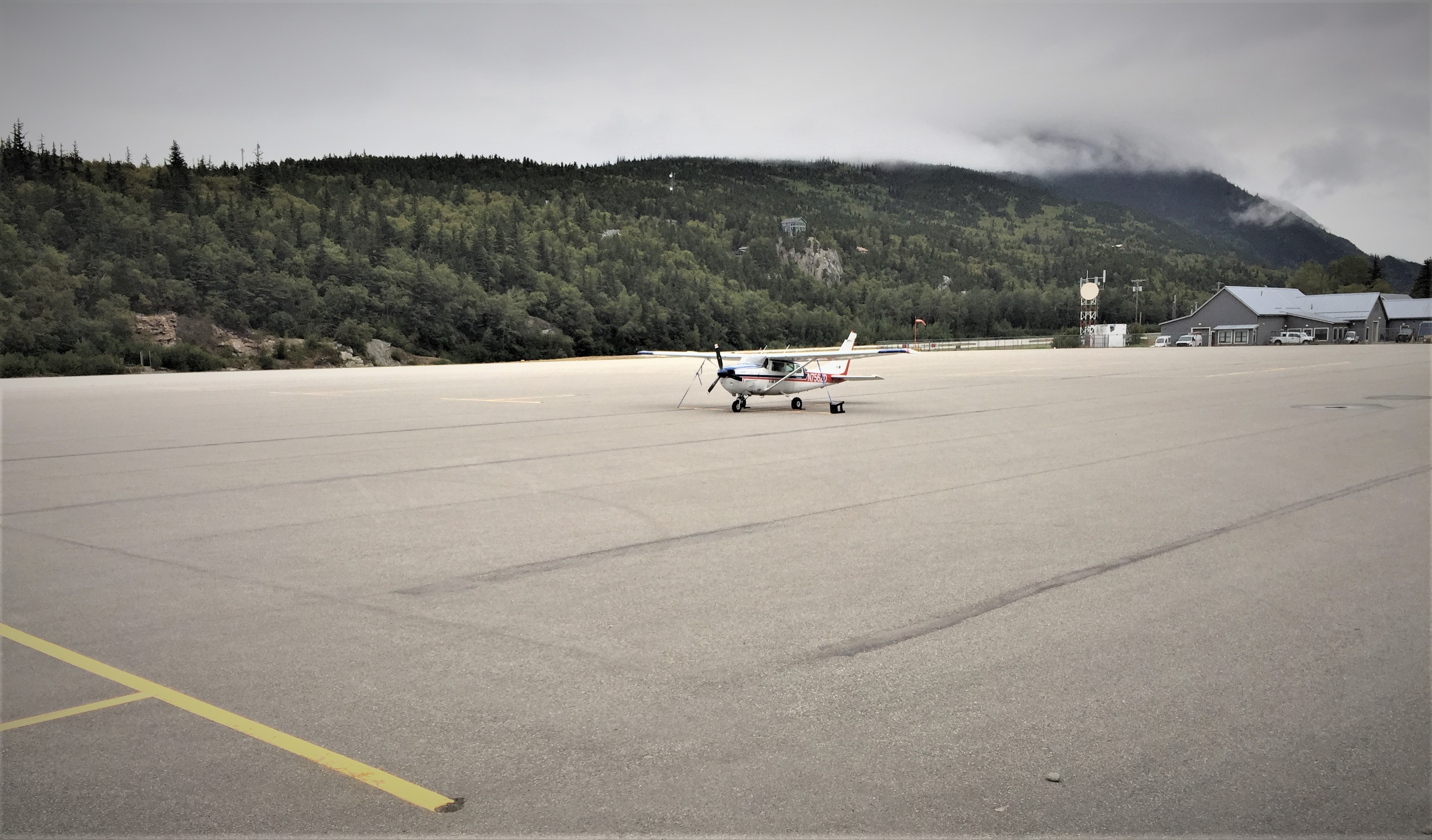
Apron view

Skagway Airport has one runway designated 2/20 with an asphalt surface measuring 3,550 by 75 feet (1,082 x 23 m). For the 12-month period ending December 31, 2006, the airport had 12,500 aircraft operations, an average of 34 per day: 86% air taxi and 14% general aviation.

The airport does not have a tower, but does have a small passenger building at the south end. Skagway is known as a very windy place. In the summer the wind generally blows from the south and can be quite strong and gusty. In the winter the wind turns around and blows from the north. The airport is situated in a north–south direction and against the west side of the valley next to the Skagway River. There have been a number of fatal accidents over the past decades, generally by privately owned aircraft owners who did not understand the tight constraints of the path of landings and takeoffs. It is wise to talk to an experienced pilot from one of the airlines to understand the issues.

There have been landings at this airport by small jet aircraft, but rarely. At the south end, in the summer, there is a commercial helicopter tourist company that flies multiple craft throughout the day. Rarely, seaplanes have landed in the ocean and taxied to the small boat harbor, but a new wave-wall that was constructed a few years ago makes that option more difficult. Also, the wind can make the ocean very choppy at times.

== Airline and destinations ==
The following airline offers scheduled passenger service at this airport:

Airlines	Destinations
Alaska Seaplanes	Haines, Juneau

== Statistics ==
=== Airline market share ===
Carrier shares for 2015
Carrier	Passengers (arriving and departing)
SeaPort Airlines	9,920(59.8%)
Kalinin Aviation LLC dba Alaska Seaplanes	6,660(40.2%)

=== Top destinations ===
Top domestic destinations (2015)
Rank	City	Airport	Passengers
1	Juneau, AK	JNU	7,070
2	Haines, AK	HNS	870

== See also ==
- Skagway Seaplane Base
- List of airports in Alaska
