= Hoonah Seaplane Base =

Seaplane base in Alaska, United States

- IATA: none; ICAO: POOH; FAA LID: OOH

Summary
- Airport type: Public
- Owner: State of Alaska DOT&PF - Southeast Region
- Serves: Hoonah, Alaska
- Elevation AMSL: 0 ft (0 m)
- Coordinates: 58°06′44″N 135°27′06″W

Map
- Location of airport in Alaska

Runways
Direction	Length		Surface
Direction	ft	m	Surface
E/W	9,000	2,743	Water
- Source: Federal Aviation Administration

Hoonah Seaplane Base (ICAO: POOH, FAA LID: OOH) is a state-owned public-use seaplane base located in Hoonah, Alaska. It is included in the National Plan of Integrated Airport Systems for 2011–2015, which categorized it as a general aviation facility.

== Facilities ==
Hoonah Seaplane Base has one seaplane landing area designated E/W which measures 9,000 by 5,000 feet (2,743 x 1,524 m).

== See also ==
- Hoonah Airport
- List of airports in Alaska
