= KDK (disambiguation) =

KDK is a Japanese ventilation brand.

KDK may also refer to:

- Kindle Development Kit, for Amazon's e-reader
- Kodiak Municipal Airport, Alaska, US (IATA: KDK)
- Numèè language, spoken in New Caledonia (ISO 639: kdk)
- Ombudsman Institution, institution in Turkey (Kamu Denetçiliği Kurumu)
