= UUK =

UUK can refer to:

- Universities UK, an advocacy group for U.K. universities
- Ugnu-Kuparuk Airport, an airport located in Kuparuk, Alaska, U.S., by IATA code
- Uzhavar Uzhaippalar Katchi, a political party in Tamil Nadu, India
