= LKK =

LKK may refer to:

- Kulik Lake Airport, Alaska, IATA and FAA LID airport code
- Lee Kum Kee, a Hong Kong–based food company
