= JBT =

JBT may refer to:

- JBT Corporation, an American food processing machinery and airport equipment company
- JBT (EP), by the John Butler Trio
- Bethel Seaplane Base (IATA: JBT), in Alaska
- Djeoromitxí language (ISO 639-3: jbt), a nearly extinct language of Brazil
- Jervis Bay Territory, a territory of the Commonwealth of Australia
- John Butler Trio, an Australian roots/rock band
- Josip Broz Tito, President of Yugoslavia
