= Napaskiak Airport =

Airport in Alaska, United States

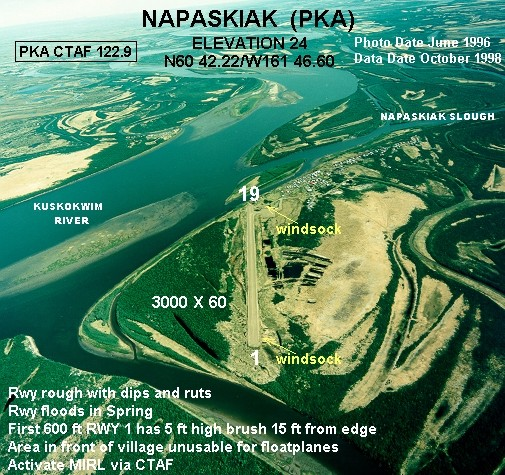
- IATA: PKA; ICAO: PAPK; FAA LID: PKA

Summary
- Airport type: Public
- Owner: State of Alaska DOT&PF - Central Region
- Serves: Napaskiak, Alaska
- Elevation AMSL: 24 ft / 7 m
- Coordinates: 60°42′10″N 161°46′42″W

Map
- Location of airport in Alaska

Runways
Direction	Length		Surface
Direction	ft	m	Surface
2/20	3,000	914	Gravel
9W/27W	15,000	4,572	Water

Statistics
- Enplanements (2008): 1,321
- Source: Federal Aviation Administration

Napaskiak Airport (IATA: PKA, ICAO: PAPK, FAA LID: PKA) is a state-owned, public-use airport located one nautical mile (1.85 km) southwest of the central business district of Napaskiak, a city in the Bethel Census Area of the U.S. state of Alaska.

As per Federal Aviation Administration records, Napaskiak Airport had 1,321 passenger boardings (enplanements) in calendar year 2008, a decrease of 28.9% from the 1,858 enplanements in 2007. This airport is included in the FAA's National Plan of Integrated Airport Systems (2009–2013), which categorizes it as a general aviation facility.

== Facilities ==
Napaskiak Airport has one runway designated 2/20 with a gravel surface measuring 3,000 by 60 feet (914 x 18 m). It also has a seaplane waterway on the Kuskokwim River which is designated 9W/27W and measures 15,000 by 2,000 feet (4,572 x 610 m). The airport is unattended.

== See also ==
- List of airports in Alaska
