= Paxson Airport =

- IATA: none; ICAO: PAXK; FAA LID: PXK

Summary
- Airport type: Public
- Owner: Paxson Lodge Inc.
- Serves: Paxson, Alaska
- Elevation AMSL: 2,653 ft / 809 m
- Coordinates: 63°01′28″N 145°30′02″W

Map
- Location of airport in Alaska

Runways
Direction	Length		Surface
Direction	ft	m	Surface
13/31	1,800	549	Turf/gravel
- Source: Federal Aviation Administration

Paxson Airport (ICAO: PAXK, FAA LID: PXK) is a privately owned public-use airport in Paxson, located in the Copper River Census Area of the U.S. state of Alaska.

== Facilities ==
Paxson Airport has one runway designated 13/31 with a turf and gravel surface measuring 1,800 by 60 feet (549 x 18 m).

== See also ==
- List of airports in Alaska
