= Yankee Creek Airport =

Yankee Creek Airport Yankee Creek 2 Airport
- IATA: none; ICAO: none; FAA LID: A77

Summary
- Airport type: Public
- Owner: Doyon Limited
- Serves: Yankee Creek, Alaska
- Elevation AMSL: 1,120 ft / 341 m
- Coordinates: 63°00′07″N 156°22′02″W

Map
- Location of airport in Alaska

Runways
Direction	Length		Surface
Direction	ft	m	Surface
13/31	1,560	475	Gravel/dirt

Statistics (2005)
- Aircraft operations: 20
- Source: Federal Aviation Administration

Yankee Creek Airport (FAA LID: A77), also known as Yankee Creek 2 Airport, is a privately owned public-use airport located one nautical mile (2 km) south of the central business district of Yankee Creek, in the Yukon-Koyukuk Census Area of the U.S. state of Alaska.

== Facilities and aircraft ==
The airport has one runway designated 13/31 with a gravel and dirt surface measuring 1,560 by 16 feet (475 x 5 m).

== See also ==
- List of airports in Alaska
