= Bethel Seaplane Base =

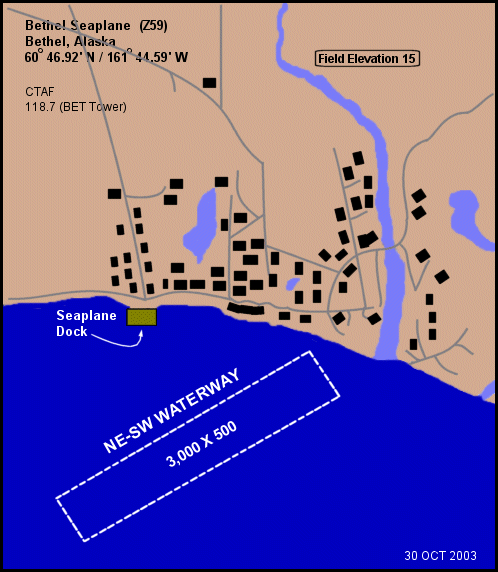
- IATA: JBT; ICAO: none; FAA LID: Z59

Summary
- Airport type: Public
- Owner: Public Domain
- Serves: Bethel, Alaska
- Elevation AMSL: 15 ft (4.6 m)
- Coordinates: 60°46′55″N 161°44′35″W

Map
- Location of airport in Alaska

Runways
Direction	Length		Surface
Direction	ft	m	Surface
NE/SW	3,000	914	Water

Statistics
- Based aircraft: 15
- Source: Federal Aviation Administration

Bethel Seaplane Base (IATA: JBT, FAA LID: Z59) is a public use seaplane base located on the Kuskokwim River in Bethel, a city in the Bethel Census Area of the U.S. state of Alaska.

The state-owned Bethel Airport is located three nautical miles (5 km) west of this seaplane base. Five nautical miles (9 km) to the south, also on the Kuskokwim River, is the Napaskiak Airport.

== Facilities ==
Bethel Seaplane Base has one waterway designated NE/SW which measures 3,000 by 500 feet (914 x 152 m). The facility is unattended. There are 15 single-engine aircraft based at this airport.

== See also ==
- List of airports in Alaska
