= Summit Airport (Alaska) =

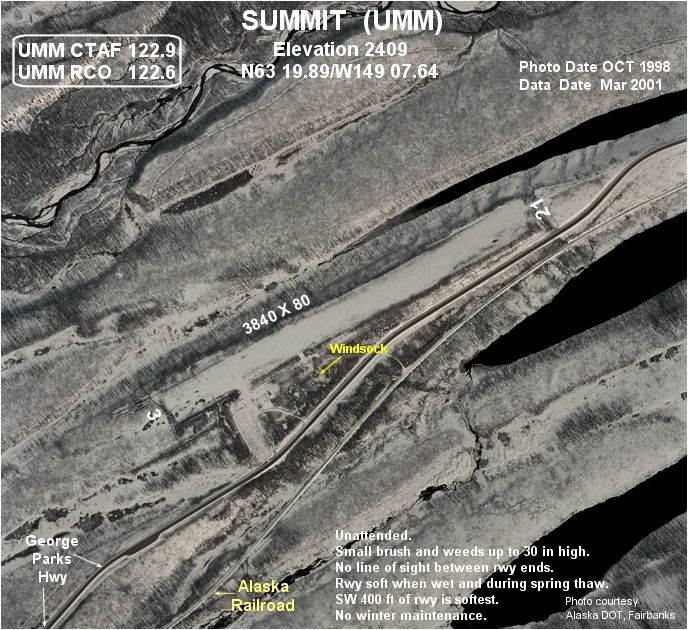
- IATA: UMM; ICAO: PAST; FAA LID: UMM

Summary
- Airport type: Public
- Owner: Alaska DOT&PF - Northern Region
- Serves: Summit, Alaska
- Elevation AMSL: 2,409 ft / 734 m
- Coordinates: 63°19′53″N 149°07′38″W

Map
- Location of airport in Alaska

Runways
Direction	Length		Surface
Direction	ft	m	Surface
3/21	3,840	1,170	Gravel

Statistics (2005)
- Aircraft operations: 800
- Source: Federal Aviation Administration

Summit Airport (IATA: UMM, ICAO: PAST, FAA LID: UMM) is a state-owned public-use airport located in Summit, in the Matanuska-Susitna Borough of the U.S. state of Alaska. It is about six miles south-southwest of Cantwell, Alaska.

== Facilities and aircraft ==
Summit Airport has one runway designated 3/21 with a gravel surface measuring 3,840 by 80 feet (1,170 x 24 m). For the 12-month period ending December 31, 2005, the airport had 800 aircraft operations, an average of 66 per month: 94% general aviation and 6% scheduled commercial.

== See also ==
- List of airports in Alaska
