= Flat Airport =

- IATA: none; ICAO: none; FAA LID: FLT

Summary
- Airport type: Public
- Owner: State of Alaska DOT&PF - Central Region
- Serves: Flat, Alaska
- Elevation AMSL: 343 ft / 105 m
- Coordinates: 62°27′10″N 157°59′12″W

Map
- Location of airport in Alaska

Runways
Direction	Length		Surface
Direction	ft	m	Surface
8/26	4,045	1,233	Turf/Gravel
- Source: Airnav.com

Flat Airport (FAA LID: FLT) is a state-owned public-use airport located in Flat, a census-designated place in the Yukon-Koyukuk Census Area of the U.S. state of Alaska.

== Facilities and aircraft ==
Flat Airport has one runway designated 8/26 with a mixed turf/gravel surface measuring 4,405 x 90 feet (1233 x 27 m). There is no listed aircraft operations for this airport.

According to the FAA chart supplement for Flat Airport, it is noted that the surface of the runway is in poor condition, with 12-30 inches of grass and brush on the runway, trees lining either side, and the northern 150 feet being deemed unusable.

== Accidents and incidents ==
- October 26, 1934: A Ford Trimotor operated by Ptarmigan Airlines was arriving at Flat when then landing gear collapsed upon landing. While the aircraft was a write-off, no one was injured in the accident.

== See also ==
- List of airports in Alaska
