= Nyac Airport =

- IATA: ZNC; ICAO: none; FAA LID: ZNC

Summary
- Airport type: Private
- Owner: Tuluksak Dredging Co.
- Location: Nyac, Alaska
- Elevation AMSL: 460 ft / 140 m
- Coordinates: 60°58′50″N 159°59′37″W

Map
- Location of airport in Alaska

Runways
Direction	Length		Surface
Direction	ft	m	Surface
5/23	3,650	1,113	Gravel
- Source: Federal Aviation Administration

Nyac Airport (IATA: ZNC, FAA LID: ZNC) is a private airport located two miles (3 km) southwest of the central business district of Nyac, in the Bethel Census Area of the U.S. state of Alaska.

Nyac is located in the Kilbuck Mountains of southwestern Alaska, approximately 60 miles east of Bethel. Access during the summer months is by chartered flights from Bethel or Aniak.

== Facilities ==
Nyac Airport has two runways:

- Runway 5/23: 3,650 x 100 ft. (1,113 x 30 m), surface: gravel
- Runway 5/23: 2,600 x 70 ft

== See also ==
- List of airports in Alaska
