= Naknek Airport =

Airfield in Alaska

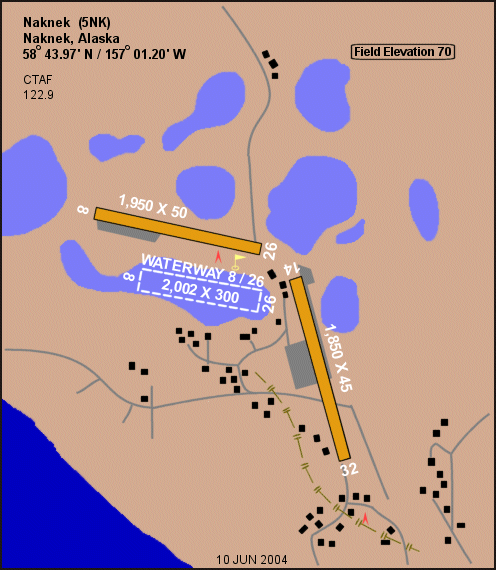
- IATA: NNK; ICAO: none; FAA LID: 5NK

Summary
- Airport type: Public
- Owner: State of Alaska DOT&PF - Central Region
- Serves: Naknek, Alaska
- Elevation AMSL: 70 ft / 21 m
- Coordinates: 58°43′58″N 157°01′12″W

Map
- Location of airport in Alaska

Runways
Direction	Length		Surface
Direction	ft	m	Surface
8/26	1,950	594	Gravel
14/32	1,850	564	Gravel
8W/26W	2,000	610	Water

Statistics (2005)
- Aircraft operations: 7,700
- Based aircraft: 24
- Enplanements (2008): 161
- Source: Federal Aviation Administration

Naknek Airport (IATA: NNK, FAA LID: 5NK) is a state-owned, public-use airport located one nautical mile (1.85 km) north of the central business district of Naknek, in the Bristol Bay Borough of the U.S. state of Alaska.

As per Federal Aviation Administration records, this airport had 161 commercial passenger boardings (enplanements) in calendar year 2008, an increase of 53% from the 105 enplanements in 2007. Naknek Airport is included in the FAA's National Plan of Integrated Airport Systems (2009–2013), which categorizes it as a general aviation facility.

== Facilities and aircraft ==
Naknek Airport has three runways with gravel surfaces: 8/26 is 1,950 by 50 feet (594 x 15 m) and 14/32 is 1,850 by 45 feet (564 x 14 m). It also has a seaplane landing area designated 8W/26W which measures 2,000 by 300 feet (610 x 91 m). The waterway is not on the airport property and is not owned or operated by the State of Alaska. The airport is unattended.

For the 12-month period ending December 31, 2005, the airport had 7,700 aircraft operations, an average of 21 per day: 92% general aviation and 8% air taxi. At that time there were 24 aircraft based at this airport: 96% single-engine and 4% helicopter.

== See also ==
- List of airports in Alaska
