= Trident Basin Seaplane Base =

- IATA: none; ICAO: none; FAA LID: T44

Summary
- Airport type: Public
- Owner: City of Kodiak Public Works
- Serves: Kodiak, Alaska
- Elevation AMSL: 0 ft / 0 m
- Coordinates: 57°46′51″N 152°23′29″W

Map
- Location of airport in Alaska

Runways
Direction	Length		Surface
Direction	ft	m	Surface
2/20	4,400	1,341	Water

Statistics (2006)
- Aircraft operations: 5,000
- Based aircraft: 11
- Enplanements (2008): 11,218
- Source: Federal Aviation Administration

Trident Basin Seaplane Base (FAA LID: T44) is a city-owned, public-use seaplane base located in the City of Kodiak, in the Kodiak Island Borough of the U.S. state of United States. This seaplane base is located 4 nautical miles (7 km) northeast of the Kodiak Airport.

As per Federal Aviation Administration records, Trident Basin SPB had 11,218 passenger boardings (enplanements) in calendar year 2008, an increase of 338% from the 2,561 enplanements in 2007. Trident Basin SPB is included in the FAA's National Plan of Integrated Airport Systems (2009–2013), which categorizes it as a general aviation facility.

== Facilities and aircraft ==
Trident Basin Seaplane Base has one seaplane landing area designated 2/20 which measures 4,400 by 200 feet (1,341 x 61 m). For the 12-month period ending December 31, 2006, it had 5,000 air taxi aircraft operations, an average of 13 per day. There are 11 single-engine aircraft based here.

Remarks:

- Reef exposed on low tides at both ends of runway. Some boat traffic; floating debris; docks; ramps; anchorage sheltered; bridge from Near Island to city area.
- Fuel available with credit card.
- During hours that Kodiak ATCT operational pilots arriving/departing Trident Basin shall contact ATCT for traffic advisories and/or special VFR clearance as necessary; when ATCT closed pilots will self-announce over CTAF.
- Kodiak weather camera available on internet at https://web.archive.org/web/20090831040305/http://akweathercams.faa.gov/

== See also ==
- List of airports in Alaska
