= Alsek River Airport =

- IATA: none; ICAO: none; FAA LID: A57

Summary
- Airport type: Public
- Owner: USFS Tongass National Forest
- Serves: Yakutat, Alaska
- Elevation AMSL: 30 ft (9.1 m)
- Coordinates: 59°11′57″N 138°27′04″W

Map
- Location of airport in Alaska

Runways
Direction	Length		Surface
Direction	ft	m	Surface
6/24	1,860	567	Turf

Statistics (2007)
- Aircraft operations: 200
- Source: Federal Aviation Administration

Alsek River Airport (FAA LID: A57) is a public-use airport located 44 nautical miles (81 km) southeast of the central business district of Yakutat, a city and borough in the U.S. state of Alaska. It is owned by the USFS Tongass National Forest. As per Federal Aviation Administration records, the airport had 507 passenger boardings (enplanements) in calendar year 2008.

== Facilities and aircraft ==
Alsek River Airport has one runway designated 6/24 with a turf surface measuring 1,860 by 12 feet (567 x 4 m). For the 12-month period ending December 31, 2007, the airport had 200 aircraft operations, an average of 16 per month: 50% air taxi and 50% general aviation.

== See also ==
- List of airports in Alaska
