= Devils Mountain Lodge Airport =

- IATA: none; ICAO: PABN; FAA LID: IBN

Summary
- Airport type: Private
- Owner: Devils Mountain Lodge
- Serves: Nabesna, Alaska
- Elevation AMSL: 2,880 ft (880 m)
- Coordinates: 62°24′07″N 142°59′44″W

Map
- Location of airport in Alaska

Runways
Direction	Length		Surface
Direction	ft	m	Surface
14/32	2,000	610	Gravel/dirt

Statistics (1975)
- Aircraft operations: 1,200
- Source: Federal Aviation Administration

Devils Mountain Lodge Airport (ICAO: PABN, FAA LID: IBN) is an airport located two nautical miles (4 km) north of the central business district of Nabesna, Alaska. It is owned by Devils Mountain Lodge.

== Facilities and aircraft ==
Devils Mountain Lodge Airport has one runway designated 14/32 with a gravel and dirt surface measuring 2,000 by 40 feet (610 x 12 m). For the 12-month period ending October 15, 1975, the airport had 1,200 aircraft operations, an average of 100 per month: 58% general aviation and 42% air taxi.

== See also ==
- List of airports in Alaska
