= Council Airport =

- IATA: CIL; ICAO: none; FAA LID: K29

Summary
- Airport type: Public
- Owner: Alaska DOT&PF - Northern Region
- Serves: Council, Alaska
- Elevation AMSL: 85 ft (26 m)
- Coordinates: 64°53′52″N 163°42′12″W

Map
- Location of airport in Alaska

Runways
| Direction | Length | | Surface |
| Direction | ft | m | Surface |
|---|---|---|---|
| 10/28 | 3,000 | 914 | Gravel/dirt |
- Source: Federal Aviation Administration

Council Airport (IATA: CIL, FAA LID: K29) is a state-owned public-use airport located one nautical mile (1.8 km) north of the central business district of Council, in the Nome Census Area in the U.S. state of Alaska.

== Facilities ==
Council Airport covers an area of 114 acres (46 ha) at an elevation of 85 feet (26 m) above mean sea level. It has one runway designated 10/28 with a gravel and dirt surface measuring 3,000 by 60 feet (914 x 18 m).

== See also ==
- List of airports in Alaska
