= Tyonek Airport =

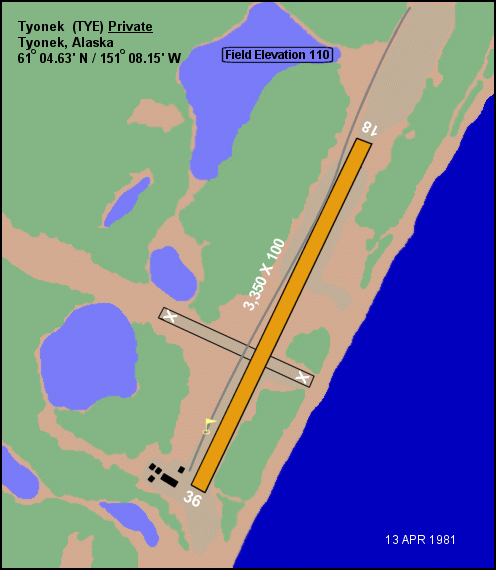
- IATA: TYE; ICAO: none; FAA LID: TYE

Summary
- Airport type: Private
- Owner: Village of Tyonek
- Serves: Tyonek, Alaska
- Elevation AMSL: 110 ft / 34 m
- Coordinates: 61°04′32″N 151°07′56″W

Map
- Location of airport in Alaska

Runways
Direction	Length		Surface
Direction	ft	m	Surface
18/36	3,000	914	Gravel

Statistics
- Enplanements (2008): 2,356
- Aircraft operations (1988): 2,605
- Source: Federal Aviation Administration

Tyonek Airport (IATA: TYE, FAA LID: TYE) is a private-use airport located one nautical mile (1.85 km) northeast of the central business district of Tyonek, a village in the Kenai Peninsula Borough in the U.S. state of Alaska. It is owned by the Village of Tyonek.

As per Federal Aviation Administration records, the airport had 2,356 passenger boardings (enplanements) in calendar year 2008, a decrease of 27.7% from the 3,260 enplanements in 2007.

== Facilities and aircraft ==
Tyonek Airport has one runway designated 18/36 with a gravel surface measuring 3,000 by 90 feet (914 x 27 m). As per the most recent FAA records, for the 12-month period ending July 1, 1988, the airport had 2,605 aircraft operations: 77% air taxi and 23% general aviation.

== See also ==
- List of airports in Alaska
