= Road Commission Airport =

Road Commission Airport Road Commission Nr 1 Airport
- IATA: none; ICAO: none; FAA LID: 0Z2

Summary
- Airport type: Public
- Owner: Public domain
- Serves: Denali, Alaska
- Elevation AMSL: 2,525 ft / 770 m
- Coordinates: 63°06′29″N 147°31′55″W

Map
- Location of airport in Alaska

Runways
Direction	Length		Surface
Direction	ft	m	Surface
16/34	1,000	305	Gravel/dirt

Statistics (2005)
- Aircraft operations: 70
- Source: Federal Aviation Administration

Road Commission Airport (FAA LID: 0Z2), also known as Road Commission Nr 1 Airport, is a public-use airport located three nautical miles (4 mi, 6 km) south of the central business district of Denali, in the Matanuska-Susitna Borough of the U.S. state of Alaska.

The airport is located near the Denali Highway bridge crossing the Susitna River.

== Facilities and aircraft ==
The airport has one runway designated 16/34 with a gravel and dirt surface measuring 1,000 by 22 feet (305 x 7 m). For the 12-month period ending December 31, 2005, the airport had 70 aircraft operations, an average of 5 per month: 71% general aviation and 29% air taxi.

== See also ==
- List of airports in Alaska
