= Clear Airport =

Airport in Alaska, United States

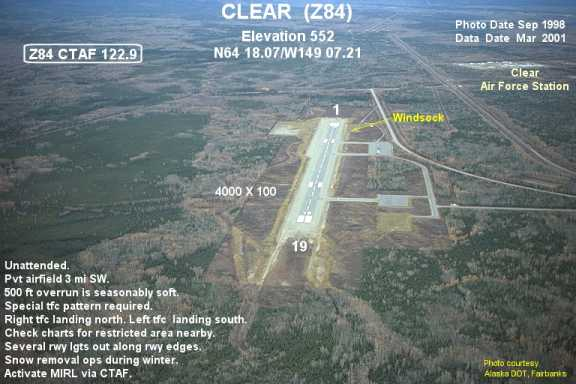
- IATA: none; ICAO: PACL; FAA LID: Z84

Summary
- Airport type: Public / military
- Owner: State of Alaska DOT&PF – Northern Region
- Serves: Clear, Alaska
- Elevation AMSL: 552 ft (168 m)
- Coordinates: 64°18′04″N 149°07′13″W

Map
- Location of airport in Alaska

Runways
Direction	Length		Surface
Direction	ft	m	Surface
1/19	4,000	1,219	Asphalt

Statistics (2005)
- Aircraft operations: 2,000
- Based aircraft: 12
- Source: Federal Aviation Administration

Clear Airport (ICAO: PACL, FAA LID: Z84) is a state-owned public-use airport located three nautical miles (6 km) southeast of the central business district of Clear, Alaska, United States.

== Facilities and aircraft ==
Clear Airport covers an area of 1,127 acres (456 ha) at an elevation of 552 feet (168 m) above mean sea level. It has one runway designated 1/19 with a 4,000 by 100 ft (1,219 x 30 m) asphalt pavement.

For the 12-month period ending December 31, 2005, the airport had 2,000 aircraft operations, an average of 166 per month: 75% general aviation and 25% military. At that time there were 12 aircraft based at this airport, all single-engine.

== See also ==
- List of airports in Alaska
