= Wainwright Air Station =

- IATA: none; ICAO: PAWT; FAA LID: AK03

Summary
- Airport type: Military
- Owner: U.S. Air Force
- Location: Wainwright, Alaska
- Elevation AMSL: 35 ft / 11 m
- Coordinates: 70°36′49″N 159°51′53″W

Map
- Location of airport in Alaska

Runways
Direction	Length		Surface
Direction	ft	m	Surface
3/21	3,000	914	Gravel

Statistics (1977)
- Aircraft operations: 110
- Source: Federal Aviation Administration

Wainwright Air Station (ICAO: PAWT, FAA LID: AK03) is a military airport located in Wainwright, Alaska. It is owned by the United States Air Force.

== Facilities and aircraft ==
Wainwright Air Station has one runway designated 3/21 with a gravel surface measuring 3,000 by 100 feet (914 x 30 m). For the 12-month period ending July 12, 1977, the airport had 110 aircraft operations, an average of 9 per month: 45.5% air taxi, 45.5% general aviation, and 9% military.

== See also ==
- Wainwright Airport (Alaska)
- List of airports in Alaska
