= Hoonah Airport =

Airport in Alaska, United States

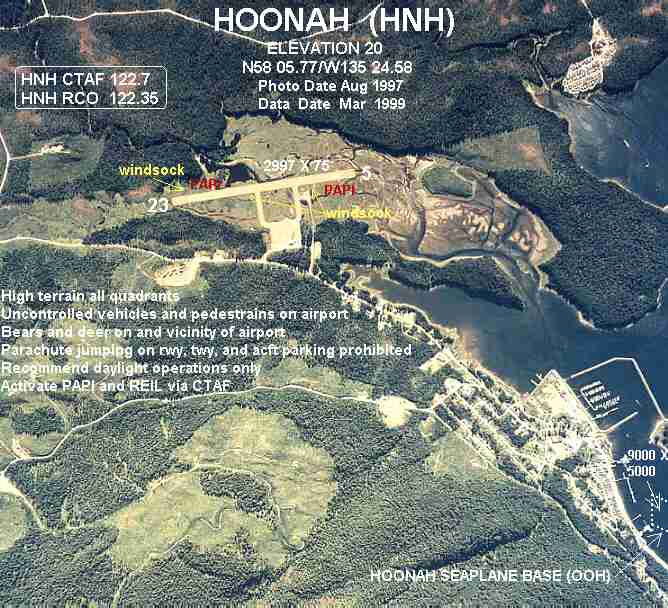
- IATA: HNH; ICAO: PAOH; FAA LID: HNH

Summary
- Airport type: Public
- Owner: State of Alaska DOT&PF - Southeast Region
- Serves: Hoonah, Alaska
- Elevation AMSL: 19 ft (5.8 m)
- Coordinates: 58°05′46″N 135°24′35″W

Map
- Location of airport in Alaska

Runways
Direction	Length		Surface
Direction	ft	m	Surface
6/24	2,997	913	Asphalt

Statistics (2015)
- Aircraft operations: 9,750
- Source: Federal Aviation Administration

Hoonah Airport (IATA: HNH, ICAO: PAOH, FAA LID: HNH) is a state-owned public-use airport located one nautical mile (2 km) southeast of the central business district of Hoonah, Alaska.

This airport is included in the National Plan of Integrated Airport Systems for 2015–2019, which categorized it as a nonprimary commercial service airport based on 9,564 enplanements in 2012. As per Federal Aviation Administration records, the airport had 7,680 passenger boardings (enplanements) in calendar year 2008, 7,651 enplanements in 2009, and 10,759 in 2010.

== Facilities and aircraft ==
Hoonah Airport has one runway designated 6/24 with an asphalt surface measuring 2,997 by 75 feet (913 x 23 m). For the 12-month period ending December 31, 2007, the airport had 3,750 aircraft operations, an average of 10 per day: 80% air taxi and 20% general aviation.

== Airlines and destinations ==
The following airline offers scheduled service:

Airlines	Destinations
Alaska Seaplanes	Juneau

== Statistics ==
Carrier shares (Dec. 2015 - Nov. 2016)
Carrier	Passengers (arriving and departing)
Kalinin	13,390(99.52%)
Air Excursions	60(0.48%)

Top domestic destinations (Dec. 2015 - Nov. 2016)
Rank	City	Airport	Passengers
1	Juneau, AK	JNU	7,000

== See also ==
- Hoonah Seaplane Base
- List of airports in Alaska
