= Ugnu–Kuparuk Airport =

- IATA: UUK; ICAO: PAKU; FAA LID: UBW

Summary
- Airport type: Private
- Owner: ConocoPhillips
- Location: Kuparuk, Alaska
- Elevation AMSL: 67 ft (20 m)
- Coordinates: 70°19′51″N 149°35′51″W

Map
- Location of Ugnu–Kuparuk Airport

Runways
Direction	Length		Surface
Direction	ft	m	Surface
06/24	6,551	1,997	Asphalt

Statistics (2001)
- Aircraft operations: 1,850
- Source: Federal Aviation Administration

1. Ugnu–Kuparuk Airport (IATA: UUK, ICAO: PAKU, FAA LID: UBW) is a private-use airport located in Kuparuk, Alaska, United States. It is privately owned by ConocoPhillips, which operates the Kuparuk oil field.

== Facilities and aircraft ==
Ugnu–Kuparuk Airport currently has one runway designated 06/24 with an asphalt (previously gravel) surface measuring 6,551 by 150 ft (1,997 by 46 m). For the 12-month period ending December 31, 2001, the airport had 1,850 aircraft operations, an average of 5 per day: 95% general aviation and 5% air taxi.

Although most U.S. airports use the same three-letter location identifier for the FAA and IATA, Ugnu–Kuparuk Airport is assigned UBW by the FAA and UUK by the IATA.

== See also ==
- List of airports in Alaska
