= Kulik Lake Airport =

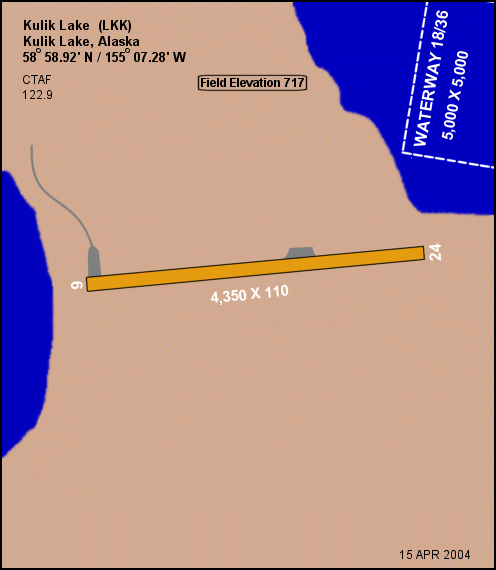
- IATA: LKK; ICAO: PAKL; FAA LID: LKK

Summary
- Airport type: Public
- Owner: Katmai Air LLC
- Serves: Kulik Lake, Lake and Peninsula Borough, Alaska, United States
- Elevation AMSL: 717 ft / 219 m
- Coordinates: 58°58′55″N 155°07′17″W

Map
- Location of airport in Alaska

Runways
Direction	Length		Surface
Direction	ft	m	Surface
6/24	4,350	1,326	Gravel
18W/36W	5,000	1,524	Water

Statistics
- Enplanements (2008): 1,842
- Source: Federal Aviation Administration

Kulik Lake Airport (IATA: LKK, ICAO: PAKL, FAA LID: LKK) is a public use airport located one nautical mile (1.85 km) south of Kulik Lake, in the Lake and Peninsula Borough of the U.S. state of Alaska. It is owned by Katmai National Park.

As per Federal Aviation Administration records, Kulik Lake Airport had 1,842 passenger boardings (enplanements) in calendar year 2008, an increase of 21% from the 1,518 enplanements in 2007.

== Facilities and aircraft ==
Kulik Lake Airport has one runway designated 6/24 which has a gravel surface measuring 4,350 by 110 feet (1,326 x 34 m). It also has a seaplane landing area designated 18W/36W which measures 5,000 by 5,000 feet (1,524 × 1,524 m). The airport is unattended.

Remarks:

- Runway crowns in center. No line of sight between runway ends.
- East half of runway on national park land and open to the public about 2000 feet; west half of runway on private land and closed to the public about 2000 feet.
- East half runway surface smooth and uniform with compacted gravel. West half runway surface covered with loose 2 inch x 5 inch round stones.
- Ramp on west end of runway privately owned. Yellow barrels mark property line.
- Heavy bear concentration; bears frequently on runway during summer.
- Use extreme caution in high and gusty wind.
- Runway 18W/36W active summer fishing season only - public use.

== See also ==
- List of airports in Alaska
