= Stampede Airport =

Airport in Denali National Park, Alaska, US

- IATA: none; ICAO: none; FAA LID: Z90

Summary
- Airport type: Public
- Owner: U.S. National Park Service
- Serves: Kantishna, Alaska
- Location: Denali National Park
- Elevation AMSL: 1,850 ft / 564 m
- Coordinates: 63°44′55″N 150°19′46″W

Map
- Location of airport in Alaska

Runways
Direction	Length		Surface
Direction	ft	m	Surface
15/33	1,960	597	Turf

Statistics (2005)
- Aircraft operations: 30
- Source: Federal Aviation Administration

Stampede Airport (FAA LID: Z90) is a public use airport located 25 nautical miles (29 mi, 46 km) northeast of the central business district of Kantishna, a community in the Denali Borough of the U.S. state of Alaska. The airport is located in the Denali National Park and Preserve and owned by the U.S. National Park Service.

== Facilities and aircraft ==
Stampede Airport has one runway designated 15/33 with a turf surface measuring 1,960 by 40 feet (597 x 12 m). In past years, the airstrip was 4,000 feet long but now about half is grown over with 10+ foot tall trees. For the 12-month period ending December 31, 2005, the airport had 30 aircraft operations, an average of 2 per month: 67% air taxi and 33% general aviation. The National Park Service has restricted this airstrip for commercial landings though it is open to private landings.

== See also ==
- List of airports in Alaska
