= Naukati Bay Seaplane Base =

Naukati Bay Seaplane Base (Nichin Cove Seaplane Base)
- IATA: NKI; ICAO: none; FAA LID: AK62

Summary
- Airport type: Public use
- Owner: Naukati Bay Community
- Serves: Naukati Bay, Alaska
- Location: Tuxekan Island
- Elevation AMSL: 0 ft / 0 m
- Coordinates: 55°50′59″N 133°13′40″W

Map
- Location in Alaska

Runways
Direction	Length		Surface
Direction	ft	m	Surface
N/S	10,000	3,048	Water
NE/SW	10,000	3,048	Water

Statistics (2006)
- Aircraft operations: 300
- Source: Federal Aviation Administration

Naukati Bay Seaplane Base, formerly known as Nichin Cove Seaplane Base (IATA: NKI, FAA LID: AK62), is a public use seaplane base located at Nichin Cove on the east side of Tuxekan Island, in the Prince of Wales-Hyder Census Area (formerly Prince of Wales-Outer Ketchikan Census Area) of the U.S. state of Alaska. It is owned by the Naukati Bay Community and located 2 nautical miles (4 km) southwest of Naukati Bay which is on Prince of Wales Island.

== Facilities and aircraft ==
Naukati Bay Seaplane Base resides at elevation of 0 feet (0 m) above mean sea level. It has two seaplane landing areas: one designated N/S with a water surface measuring 10,000 by 1,000 feet (3,048 x 305 m) and another designated NE/SW which is 10,000 by 300 feet (3,048 x 91 m). For the 12-month period ending December 31, 2006, the facility had 300 aircraft operations, an average of 25 per month: 83% air taxi and 17% general aviation.

== See also ==
- List of airports in Alaska
