= Delta Junction Airport =

Airport in Alaska, United States

- IATA: DJN; ICAO: none; FAA LID: D66

Summary
- Airport type: Public
- Owner: City of Delta Junction
- Serves: Delta Junction, Alaska
- Elevation AMSL: 1,150 ft (350 m)
- Coordinates: 64°03′01″N 145°43′27″W

Map
- Location of airport in Alaska

Runways
Direction	Length		Surface
Direction	ft	m	Surface
7/25	2,500	762	Gravel
13/31	1,600	488	Dirt

Statistics
- Based aircraft: 16
- Source: Federal Aviation Administration

Delta Junction Airport (IATA: DJN, FAA LID: D66) is a public use airport located in and owned by Delta Junction, a city in the Southeast Fairbanks Census Area of the U.S. state of Alaska.

As per Federal Aviation Administration records, the airport had 252 passenger boardings (enplanements) in calendar year 2008, and 350 enplanements in 2010.

== Facilities and aircraft ==
Delta Junction Airport covers an area of 80 acres (32 ha) at an elevation of 1,150 feet (351 m) above mean sea level. It has two runways: 7/25 is 2,500 by 60 feet (762 x 18 m) with a gravel surface and 13/31 is 1,600 by 60 feet (488 x 18 m) with a dirt surface. There are 16 aircraft based at this airport: 94% single-engine and 6% multi-engine.

== See also ==
- Allen Army Airfield (IATA: BIG, ICAO: PABI, FAA LID: BIG) at 63°59′43″N 145°43′12″W
- List of airports in Alaska
