= Bear Creek 3 Airport =

- IATA: BCC; ICAO: none; FAA LID: Z48

Summary
- Airport type: Public
- Owner: Public Domain
- Serves: Bear Creek, Alaska
- Elevation AMSL: 740 ft (230 m)
- Coordinates: 63°34′18″N 156°08′39″W

Map
- Location of airport in Alaska

Runways
Direction	Length		Surface
Direction	ft	m	Surface
15/33	1,675	511	Gravel/dirt

Statistics (2005)
- Aircraft operations: 300
- Source: Federal Aviation Administration

Bear Creek 3 Airport (IATA: BCC, FAA LID: Z48) is a public-use airport located three nautical miles (4 mi, 6 km) west of the central business district of Bear Creek, in the Yukon-Koyukuk Census Area of the U.S. state of Alaska. Bear Creek 3 is 40 nautical miles (46 mi; 74 km) north of McGrath Airport.

== Facilities and aircraft ==
Bear Creek 3 Airport has one runway designated 15/33 with a gravel and dirt surface measuring 1,675 by 40 feet (511 by 12 m). For the 12-month period ending December 31, 2005, the airport had 300 aircraft operations, an average of 25 per month: 67% air taxi and 33% general aviation.

== Other airports in Bear Creek ==
- Bear Creek 1 Airport (FAA LID: AK02) is a publicly owned private-use airport located at 65°32′24″N 161°03′45″W. It has gravel runway designated 10/28 which measures 1,400 by 65 feet (427 by 20 m).

== See also ==
- List of airports in Alaska
