= Kodiak Municipal Airport =

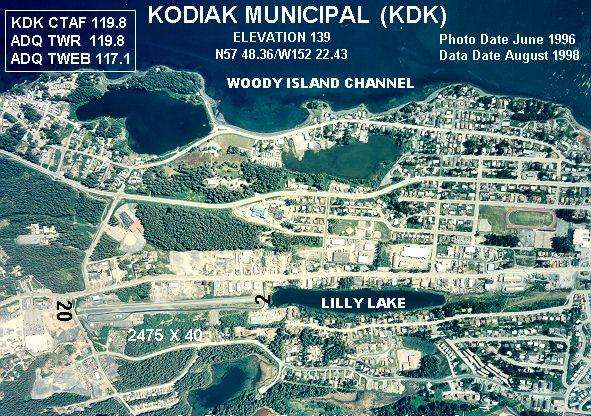
- IATA: KDK; ICAO: PAKD; FAA LID: KDK

Summary
- Airport type: Public
- Owner: City of Kodiak
- Serves: Kodiak, Alaska
- Elevation AMSL: 139 ft (42 m)
- Coordinates: 57°48′21″N 152°22′26″W

Map
- Location of airport in Alaska

Runways
Direction	Length		Surface
Direction	ft	m	Surface
2/20	2,475	754	Asphalt/gravel

Statistics (2006)
- Aircraft operations: 300
- Based aircraft: 12
- Source: Federal Aviation Administration

Kodiak Municipal Airport (IATA: KDK, ICAO: PAKD, FAA LID: KDK) is a city-owned public-use airport located two nautical miles (4 km) northeast of the central business district of Kodiak, a city on Kodiak Island in the U.S. state of Alaska.

The FAA's National Plan of Integrated Airport Systems for 2007-2011 categorized this as commercial service airport. However, that classification last applied in calendar year 2004 when the airport had 6,963 passenger boardings (enplanements). That number decreased to 703 in 2005, 6 in 2006, and none in 2007.

== Facilities and aircraft ==
Kodiak Municipal Airport has one runway designated 2/20 with a 2,475 by 40 ft (754 x 12 m) asphalt and gravel surface.

For the 12-month period ending December 31, 2006, the airport had 300 aircraft operations, an average of 25 per month, all of which were general aviation.

Four years prior to that the airport had 11,200 aircraft operations in 12 months, 54% general aviation and 46% air taxi.

== See also ==
- List of airports in Alaska
