= Tokeen Seaplane Base =

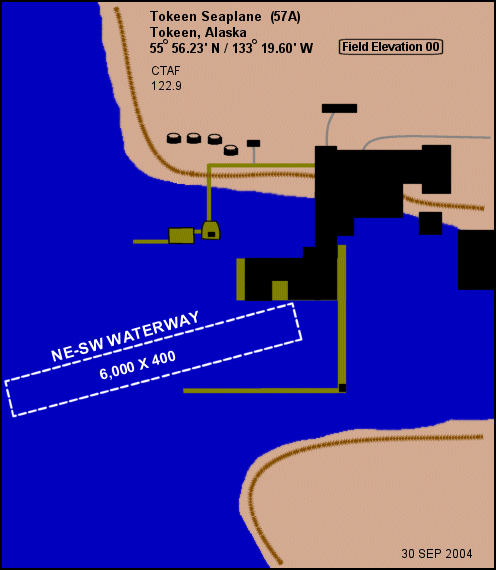
- IATA: TKI; ICAO: none; FAA LID: 57A

Summary
- Airport type: Public
- Owner: Public domain
- Serves: Tokeen, Alaska
- Elevation AMSL: 0 ft / 0 m
- Coordinates: 55°56′14″N 133°19′36″W

Map
- Location of airport in Alaska

Runways
Direction	Length		Surface
Direction	ft	m	Surface
NE/SW	6,000	1,829	Water

Statistics (2006)
- Aircraft operations: 55
- Source: Federal Aviation Administration

Tokeen Seaplane Base (IATA: TKI, FAA LID: 57A) is a public use seaplane base located in Tokeen, in the Prince of Wales-Hyder Census Area in the U.S. state of Alaska.

Although most U.S. airports use the same three-letter location identifier for the FAA and IATA, this airport is assigned TKI by the IATA and 57A by the FAA (which assigned TKI to McKinney National Airport in McKinney, Texas).

== Facilities and aircraft ==
Tokeen Seaplane Base has one seaplane landing area designated NE/SW which measures 6,000 by 400 feet (1,829 x 122 m). For the 12-month period ending December 31, 2006, the airport had 55 aircraft operations, an average of 4 per month: 91% air taxi and 9% general aviation.

== See also ==
- List of airports in Alaska
