= Lost River 1 Airport =

- IATA: none; ICAO: none; FAA LID: LSR

Summary
- Airport type: Private
- Owner: Ron Sheardown
- Serves: Lost River, Alaska
- Elevation AMSL: 80 ft / 24 m
- Coordinates: 65°23′46″N 167°09′47″W

Map
- Location of airport in Alaska

Runways
Direction	Length		Surface
Direction	ft	m	Surface
18/36	3,650	1,113	Gravel

Statistics (1983)
- Aircraft operations: 500
- Source: Federal Aviation Administration

Lost River 1 Airport (FAA LID: LSR) is an airport located at Lost River, in the Nome Census Area of the U.S. state of Alaska.

== Facilities and aircraft ==
Lost River 1 Airport has one runway designated 18/36 with a gravel surface measuring 3,650 by 100 feet (1,113 by 30 metres). For the 12-month period ending August 16, 1983, the airport had 500 aircraft operations, an average of 41 per month: 80% air taxi and 20% general aviation.

== See also ==
- Lost River 2 Airport (FAA LID: AK45) located at 65°27′22″N 167°10′32″W which has a 3,120 by 150 ft (951 by 46 m) gravel runway designated 17/35.
