= Beaver Lake Seaplane Base =

- IATA: none; ICAO: none; FAA LID: D71

Summary
- Airport type: Public
- Owner: State of Alaska
- Serves: Big Lake, Alaska
- Elevation AMSL: 150 ft (46 m)
- Coordinates: 61°34′59″N 149°49′52″W

Map
- Location of airport in Alaska

Runways
Direction	Length		Surface
Direction	ft	m	Surface
1W/19W	5,000	1,524	Water

Statistics (2009)
- Aircraft operations: 430
- Based aircraft: 6
- Source: Federal Aviation Administration

Beaver Lake Seaplane Base (FAA LID: D71) is a state owned, public use seaplane base located four nautical miles (5 mi, 7 km) northeast of Big Lake, in the Matanuska-Susitna Borough of the U.S. state of Alaska.

== Facilities and aircraft ==
Beaver Lake Seaplane Base resides at elevation of 150 feet (46 m) above mean sea level. It has one seaplane landing area designated 1W/19W with a water surface measuring 5,000 by 400 feet (1,524 x 122 m).

For the 12-month period ending May 31, 2009, the airport had 430 aircraft operations, an average of 35 per month: 93% general aviation and 7% air taxi. At that time there were 6 aircraft based at this airport, all engine.

== See also ==
- List of airports in Alaska
