= Saginaw Seaplane Base =

- IATA: SGW; ICAO: none; FAA LID: A23

Summary
- Airport type: Public
- Owner: M. Hammer
- Serves: Saginaw Bay, Alaska
- Elevation AMSL: 0 ft / 0 m
- Coordinates: 56°53′11″N 134°09′30″W

Map
- Location of airport in Alaska

Runways
Direction	Length		Surface
Direction	ft	m	Surface
NW/SE	10,000	3,048	Water
- Source: Federal Aviation Administration

Saginaw Seaplane Base (IATA: SGW, FAA LID: A23) is a privately owned public-use seaplane base located at Saginaw Bay, Alaska. As per Federal Aviation Administration records, the airport had 418 passenger boardings (enplanements) in calendar year 2010, an increase of 27% from the 330 enplanements in 2009.

== Facilities ==
Saginaw Seaplane Base has one seaplane landing area designated NW/SE measuring 10,000 by 1,000 feet (3,048 x 305 m).

== See also ==
- List of airports in Alaska
