= Butte Municipal Airport =

- IATA: none; ICAO: none; FAA LID: AK1

Summary
- Airport type: Public
- Owner: Butte Airman's Association
- Serves: Butte, Alaska
- Elevation AMSL: 64 ft (20 m)
- Coordinates: 61°31′49″N 149°01′03″W

Map
- Location of airport in Alaska

Runways
Direction	Length		Surface
Direction	ft	m	Surface
7/25	1,806	550	Gravel

Statistics (2005)
- Aircraft operations: 860
- Source: Federal Aviation Administration

Butte Municipal Airport (FAA LID: AK1) is a public-use airport located in Butte, Alaska. It is five nautical miles (9 km) southeast of the central business district of Palmer, a city in the Matanuska-Susitna Borough of the U.S. state of Alaska. The airport is privately owned by the Butte Airman's Association.

== Facilities and aircraft ==
Butte Municipal Airport has one runway designated 7/25 with a gravel surface measuring is 1,806 by 50 feet (550 x 15 m). For the 12-month period ending December 31, 2005, the airport had 860 general aviation aircraft operations, an average of 71 per month.

== See also ==
- List of airports in Alaska
