= Jonesville Mine Airport =

- IATA: none; ICAO: PAJV; FAA LID: JVM

Summary
- Airport type: Public use
- Owner: Canadian Mine & Smeltering Co.
- Serves: Sutton, Alaska
- Elevation AMSL: 870 ft / 265 m
- Coordinates: 61°43′55″N 148°55′34″W

Map
- Location of airport in Alaska

Runways
| Direction | Length | | Surface |
| Direction | ft | m | Surface |
|---|---|---|---|
| 3/21 | 1,450 | 442 | Gravel |
- Source: Federal Aviation Administration

Jonesville Mine Airport (ICAO: PAJV, FAA LID: JVM) is a privately owned public-use airport located two nautical miles (4 km) northwest of the central business district of Sutton, in the Matanuska-Susitna Borough of the U.S. state of Alaska.

Satellite imagery displays the airport as abandoned.

== Facilities ==
Jonesville Mine Airport has one runway designated 3/21 with a gravel surface measuring 1,450 by 90 feet (442 x 27 m).
