= Ophir, Alaska =

Ophir
- Unincorporated area
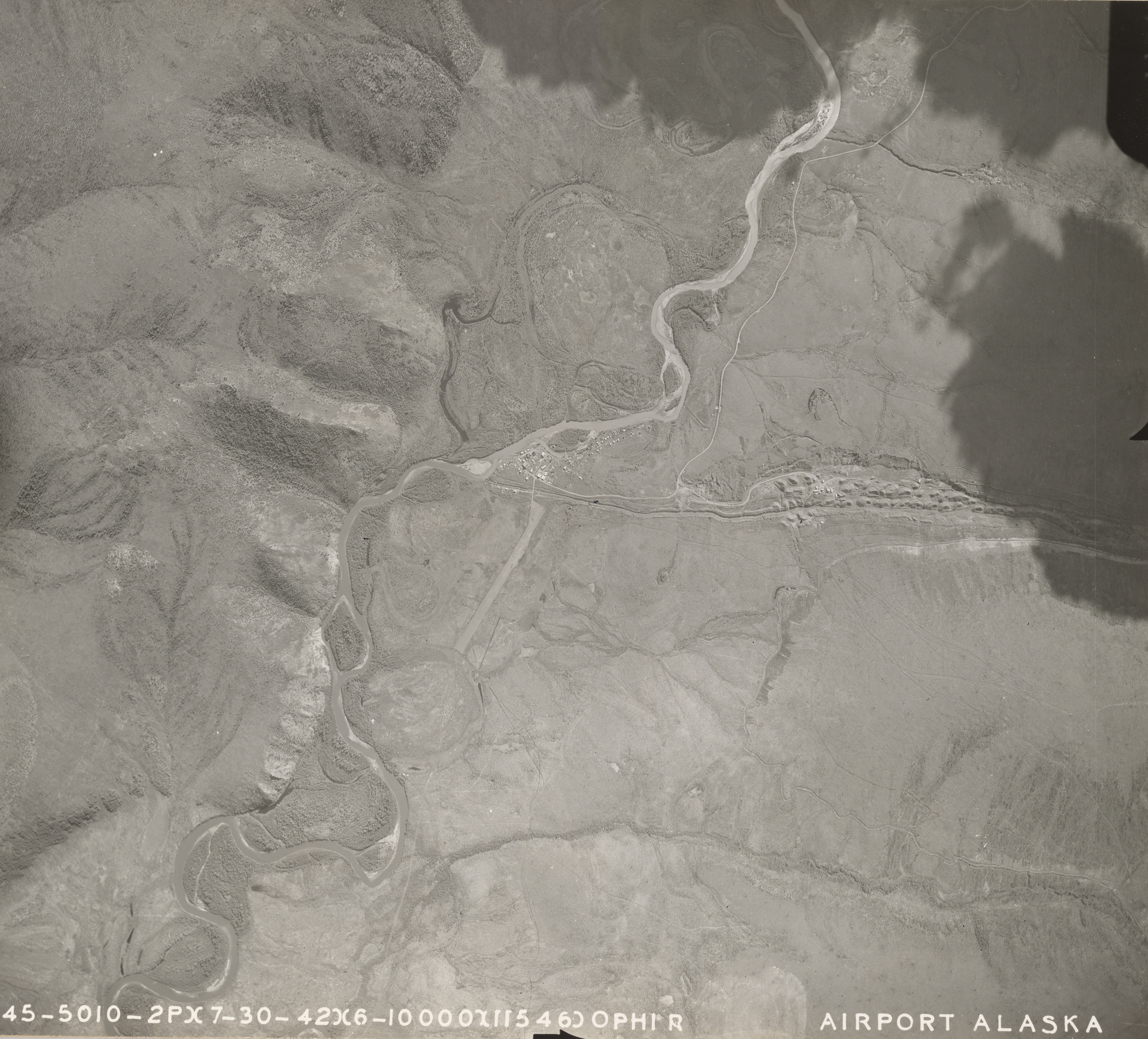
- Ophir in 1942

- Location within the state of Alaska
- Coordinates: 63°08′41″N 156°31′10″W
- Country: United States
- State: Alaska
- Census area: Yukon-Koyukuk

Government
  - State senator: Lyman Hoffman (D)
  - State rep.: Bryce Edgmon (D)
- Time zone: UTC-9 (Alaska (AKST))
  - Summer (DST): UTC-8 (AKDT)

Ophir is an unincorporated area located in the Yukon-Koyukuk Census Area in the U.S. state of Alaska.

It was named by miners after the wealthy land of Ophir mentioned in the Old Testament. The area was the site of a gold rush in 1906. Ophir reached a peak population of 122 in 1910.

Ophir is now abandoned, but serves as a checkpoint in the Iditarod Trail Sled Dog Race. An airport with a single gravel runway exists at the village, built prior to 1949. It is currently in disuse and unmaintained.

There are a number of creeks near Ophir, all on the west bank of the Innoko River, where gold placers were located starting about 1906. Yankee Creek is the closest to the source of the river, then Ganes, Little and Spruce Creeks, all above Ophir Creek. The original Iditarod Trail ran above Ganes Creek in the summer, down the Innoko valley in the winter; the current race trail goes through the old townsite, which was destroyed in a brush fire started by a camper in the 1970s, and is a rest stop.

Mining still goes on at Ganes and Little Creeks, and probably at Ophir Creek (2006). Further downriver, on the east side, there were mining operations at Folger, Cripple, Bear and Colorado Creeks. Bear Creek and Colorado still are actively mined (2006). Mining of tailings was underway at Cripple in 2010.

There were at least eight mining operations near Ophir in 1949, including two dredges, but $35 gold winnowed them down to none by about 1955. Ophir's population was (an estimated) 18 in 1960. There was sporadic mining after that, with new operations starting in the 1970s.

== Demographics ==
Historical population
Census	Pop.	Note	%±
1910	122		—
1920	22		−82.0%
1930	19		−13.6%
1940	84		342.1%
1950	68		−19.0%
U.S. Decennial Census

Ophir first reported on the 1910 U.S. Census as an unincorporated village. It continued to report until 1950. Although Donald J. Orth 1967 U.S. Geological Survey (Professional) Paper (Report No. 567) reported an estimated population of 18 in 1960, the census did not report an official separate figure that year or in any census since.

== Geography ==
Ophir is located at 63°08′41″N 156°31′10″W.

Ophir is located on the west bank of the Innoko River in western Alaska, 48 km (30 mi) northwest of McGrath, at the mouth of Ophir Creek, which was mined for many years by Gust Utilla.
