= Clear, Alaska =

Unincorporated community in Alaska, United States

- Unincorporated community
- Location within the state of Alaska
- Coordinates: 64°15′22″N 149°11′08″W
- Country: United States
- State: Alaska
- Borough: Denali

Government
  - Borough mayor: Christopher Noel
  - State senator: George Rauscher (R)
  - State rep.: Kevin McCabe (R)
- Elevation: 518 ft (158 m)
- Time zone: UTC-9 (Alaska (AKST))
  - Summer (DST): UTC-8 (AKDT)
- ZIP code: 99704
- GNIS feature ID: 1400433

Clear is an unincorporated community in Denali Borough, Alaska, United States. The small community is along the George Parks Highway at milepost 280 and encompasses residential homes and businesses. Its elevation is 518 feet (158 m). The community is completely within Anderson, Alaska.

Clear is 4 miles south of the Alaska Railroad Clear Site station established about 1918 at mile 392.9 ARR. The Geographic Names Information System reference for Clear refers to this station.

Clear is 5 miles south of Clear Space Force Station (AFS).

== Economy ==
The settlement contains two businesses, both located on the Parks Highway. The Clear Sky Lodge and the Rochester Lodge are across the highway from one another at mile marker 280. The lodges, Clear AFS, and the Anderson School provide the bulk of local populace employment.
