= Alaska Department of Transportation & Public Facilities =

Government agency in Alaska, United States

Alaska Department of Transportation & Public Facilities (DOT&PF)
- Alaska DOT&PF seal

Agency overview
- Formed: July 1, 1977; 49 years ago
- Preceding agencies: Alaska Department of Highways; Alaska Department of Public Works
- Headquarters: 3132 Channel Drive, P.O. Box 112500, Juneau, Alaska 99811
- Employees: Over 3,000 permanent full-time, part-time and non-permanent employees in 8 labor unions in 83 locations throughout the state.
- Agency executive: Ryan Anderson, P.E.,, Commissioner
- Website: dot.alaska.gov

The Alaska Department of Transportation & Public Facilities (Alaska DOT&PF) is a department within the government of Alaska. Its headquarters are in Alaska's capital city, Juneau. The mission of Alaska DOT&PF is to "Keep Alaska Moving." The Alaska Department of Transportation was established on July 1, 1977, by Alaska Highway Commissioner Walter Parker during the administration of Governor Jay Hammond. The Alaska Department of Transportation and Public Facilities merged the former departments of Highways and Public Works.

Alaska DOT&PF designs, constructs, operates and maintains the state's transportation infrastructure systems, buildings, and other facilities used by Alaskans and visitors. These include more than 5,600 miles of paved and gravel highways; more than 300 aviation facilities, including 235 rural airports and 2 international airports (Fairbanks International Airport and Ted Stevens Anchorage International Airport); 839 public facilities; 21 harbors; and a ferry system covering 3,500 marine miles serving 33 coastal communities.

== Background ==
The Board of Road Commissioners for Alaska, more commonly known as the Alaska Road Commission or ARC, was created in 1905 as a board of the U.S. War Department. It was responsible for the construction and improvement of many important Alaska highways, such as the Richardson Highway, Steese Highway, Elliot Highway and Edgerton Highway, among others. Wilds P. Richardson was the first president of the ARC, from 1905 to 1917.

The commission was transferred to the Department of the Interior in 1932, and was absorbed by the Bureau of Public Roads, a division of the Commerce Department in 1956. Today, responsibility for road development and maintenance in Alaska lies with the Alaska Department of Transportation & Public Facilities.

== Organizational structure ==
The Alaska DOT&PF is administratively divided into three regions, Northern, Central, and Southcoast. The Alaska Marine Highway System, Ted Stevens Anchorage International Airport, and Fairbanks International Airport are also overseen by Alaska DOT&PF.

The Northern Region, headquartered in Fairbanks, is the largest, most geographically diverse, and maintains more centerline miles of highway, including the Alaska Highway, Richardson Highway, Taylor Highway, Denali Highway, and Dalton Highway and portions of the Parks Highway and the Glenn Highway.

The Central Region, headquartered in Anchorage, includes the state's most urban areas, as well as some of the most remote villages on the Kuskokwim Delta, the Alaska Peninsula, and the Aleutian Chain. Central Region maintains the Seward Highway and the Sterling Highway, as well as parts of the Parks Highway and Glenn Highway.

The Southcoast Region, headquartered in Juneau, serves the coastal communities of Alaska encompassing a population of 98,000. Currently, only three Southcoast communities are connected to the continental highway system – Skagway, Haines, and Hyder.

The Alaska Marine Highway System is headquartered in Ketchikan, Alaska. From there, AMHS management directs the operation and maintenance of our fleet of nine vessels, ranging in size from the 181 ft. MV Lituya to the 418 ft. MV Columbia.

The Ted Stevens Anchorage International Airport (ANC) is a state-owned public-use airport located in Anchorage. The airport is named for Ted Stevens, a U.S. senator from Alaska in office from 1968 to 2009. It is included in the Federal Aviation Administration (FAA) National Plan of Integrated Airport Systems for 2017–2021, in which it is categorized as a medium-hub primary commercial service facility. In 2023, ANC was the 4th busiest airport in the world for cargo throughput. ANC's General Aviation capacity includes seaplane base Lake Hood, the world's busiest seaplane base, handling an average of 190 flights per day. The base has an operating control tower, and during the winter months the frozen lake surface is maintained for ski-equipped airplanes.

The Fairbanks International Airport (FAI) is a state-owned public-use airport located in Fairbanks. Fairbanks is the smallest city in the United States with regularly scheduled non-stop international flights, and FAI is the second largest multi-use airfield in Alaska. FAI's General Aviation capacity includes 322 tie downs and 175 float pond spaces. Small aircraft pilots have a choice of two runways - one is gravel and the other paved - of 2,900’ x 75’ and 6,500’x 100 feet, respectively. The float pond has a 5,400’ x 100’ landing surface.
