= Chuathbaluk Airport =

- IATA: CHU; ICAO: PACH; FAA LID: 9A3

Summary
- Airport type: Public
- Owner: State of Alaska DOT&PF
- Serves: Chuathbaluk, Alaska
- Elevation AMSL: 243 ft (74 m)
- Coordinates: 61°34′45″N 159°12′56″W

Map
- Location of airport in Alaska

Runways
Direction	Length		Surface
Direction	ft	m	Surface
9/27	3,401	1,037	Gravel/dirt

Statistics (2025)
- Based aircraft: 0
- Passengers: 441
- Freight: 74,000 lbs
- Source: Federal Aviation Administration

Chuathbaluk Airport (IATA: CHU, ICAO: PACH, FAA LID: 9A3) is a state-owned public-use airport located one nautical mile (1.85 km) northeast of the central business district of Chuathbaluk, a city in the Bethel Census Area of the U.S. state of Alaska.

== Facilities ==
Chuathbaluk Airport covers an area of 242 acres (98 ha) at an elevation of 243 feet (74 m) above mean sea level. It has one runway designated 9/27 with a gravel surface measuring 3,401 by 60 feet (1,037 x 18 m).

== Airlines and destinations ==
Airlines	Destinations
Ryan Air	Aniak, via Crooked Creek, Red Devil, Sleetmute, Stony River
Paklook	Aniak, via Crooked Creek, Red Devil, Sleetmute, Stony River

Paklook Air Services serves Chuathbaluk doing business as Yute Commuter Service

=== Statistics ===
Carrier shares: April 2024 – March 2025
Carrier	Passengers (arriving and departing)
Paklook	231(52.38%)
Ryan Air	210(47.62%)

Top domestic destinations: April 2024 – March 2025
Rank	City	Airport	Passengers
1	(Alaska) Aniak, AK	Aniak Airport	140
2	(Alaska) Crooked Creek, AK	Crooked Creek Airport	30
3	(Alaska) Bethel, AK	Bethel Airport	20
4	(Alaska) Sleetmute, AK	Sleetmute Airport	10
5	(Alaska) Holy Cross, AK	Holy Cross Airport	10

== See also ==
- List of airports in Alaska
