= Anvik Airport =

Airport in Alaska, USA

- IATA: ANV; ICAO: PANV; FAA LID: ANV

Summary
- Airport type: Public
- Owner: State of Alaska DOT&PF - Northern Region
- Location: Anvik, Alaska
- Elevation AMSL: 309 ft (94 m)
- Coordinates: 62°38′48″N 160°11′26″W

Map
- Location of airport in Alaska

Runways
Direction	Length		Surface
Direction	ft	m	Surface
17/35	4,000	1,219	Gravel

Statistics (2015)
- Aircraft operations: 0 (2014)
- Based aircraft: 0
- Passengers: 1,028
- Freight: 259,000 lbs
- Source: Federal Aviation Administration

Anvik Airport (IATA: ANV, ICAO: PANV, FAA LID: ANV) is a public airport located one mile (2 km) southeast of the central business district of Anvik, a city in the Yukon-Koyukuk Census Area, Alaska of the U.S. state of Alaska.The airport is owned by the state of Alaska and operated by the Alaska Department of Transportation and Public Facilities. It serves as an important transportation hub for the surrounding area, providing access to remote communities, fishing lodges, and hunting camps.

== Facilities ==
Anvik Airport has one runway (17/35) with a gravel surface measuring 2,960 x 75 ft. (902 x 23 m). The airport features a small terminal building with amenities like restrooms, a waiting area, and a vending machine. There is no food or beverage service available at the airport. The terminal is only open during scheduled flights and for charters.

== Airlines and destinations ==
Anvik Airport serves mainly as a gateway for visitors to Anvik and the surrounding area. The airport is often used by hunters and fishermen, and tourists looking to explore the region's natural beauty. It is also an important lifeline for the local community, providing access to medical care and other essential services.

Airlines	Destinations
Ryan Air	Aniak, Grayling, Shageluk

=== Statistics ===
Carrier shares: January – December 2015
Carrier	Passengers (arriving and departing)
Hageland	960(93.19%)
Ryan Air	50(5.25%)
Grant	10(1.26%)

Top domestic destinations: January – December 2015
Rank	City	Airport	Passengers
1	Aniak, AK	Aniak Airport (ANI)	440
2	Shageluk, AK	Shageluk Airport (SHX)	30
3	Holy Cross, AK	Holy Cross Airport (HCR)	20
4	Grayling, AK	Grayling Airport (KGX)	10
5	Emmonak, AK	Emmonak Airport (EMK)	10

== See also ==
- List of airports in Alaska
