= Crooked Creek Airport =

- IATA: CKD; ICAO: PACJ; FAA LID: CJX

Summary
- Airport type: Public
- Owner: State of Alaska DOT&PF - Central Region
- Location: Crooked Creek, Alaska
- Elevation AMSL: 178 ft (54 m)
- Coordinates: 61°52′04″N 158°08′06″W

Map
- Location of airport in Alaska

Runways
Direction	Length		Surface
Direction	ft	m	Surface
14/32	3,300	1,006	Gravel

Statistics (2016)
- Aircraft operations: 0 (2014)
- Based aircraft: 0
- Passengers: 666
- Freight: 210,000 lbs
- Source: Federal Aviation Administration

Crooked Creek Airport (IATA: CKD, ICAO: PACJ, FAA LID: CJX) is a public airport located two miles (3 km) south of the central business district of Crooked Creek, in the U.S. state of Alaska.

Although most U.S. airports use the same three-letter location identifier for the FAA and IATA, Crooked Creek Airport is assigned CJX by the FAA and CKD by the IATA.

== Facilities ==
Crooked Creek Airport has one runway—Runway 14/32, with dimensions 3300 x 75 ft. (1006 x 23 m). It has a gravel surface with medium intensity edge lights but no markings or runway end identifier lights.

== Airlines and destinations ==
Airlines	Destinations
Ryan Air	Aniak, Red Devil, Sleetmute, Stony River

=== Statistics ===
Carrier shares: January – December 2016
Carrier	Passengers (arriving and departing)
Hageland	650(90.00%)
Ryan Air	20(2.70%)

Top domestic destinations: January – December 2016
Rank	City	Airport	Passengers
1	(Alaska) Aniak, AK	Aniak Airport	310
2	(Alaska) Chuathbaluk, AK	Chuathbaluk Airport	10

== See also ==
- List of airports in Alaska
