= Holy Cross Airport =

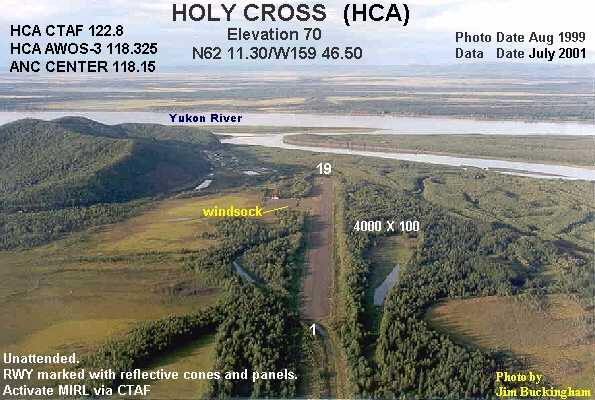
- IATA: HCR; ICAO: PAHC; FAA LID: HCA

Summary
- Airport type: Public
- Owner: State of Alaska DOT&PF - Northern Region
- Location: Holy Cross, Alaska
- Elevation AMSL: 70 ft (21 m)
- Coordinates: 62°11′18″N 159°46′30″W

Map
- Location of airport in Alaska

Runways
Direction	Length		Surface
Direction	ft	m	Surface
1/19	4,000	1,219	Gravel
- Source: Federal Aviation Administration

Holy Cross Airport (IATA: HCR, ICAO: PAHC, FAA LID: HCA, formerly 4Z4) is a state-owned public-use airport located one mile (1.6 km) south of the central business district of Holy Cross, a city in the Yukon-Koyukuk Census Area of the U.S. state of Alaska.

== History ==
Although most U.S. airports use the same three-letter location identifier for the FAA and IATA, Holy Cross Airport is assigned HCA by the FAA and HCR by the IATA.

Holy Cross Airport has one runway (1/19) with a gravel and dirt surface measuring 4,000 x 100 ft. (1,219 x 30 m).

== Airlines and destinations ==
Airlines	Destinations
Ryan Air	Aniak, Anvik, Grayling, Shageluk

== See also ==
- List of airports in Alaska
