= Sleetmute, Alaska =

Sleetmute, Alaska Cellitemiut, Tovisq'oł
- CDP
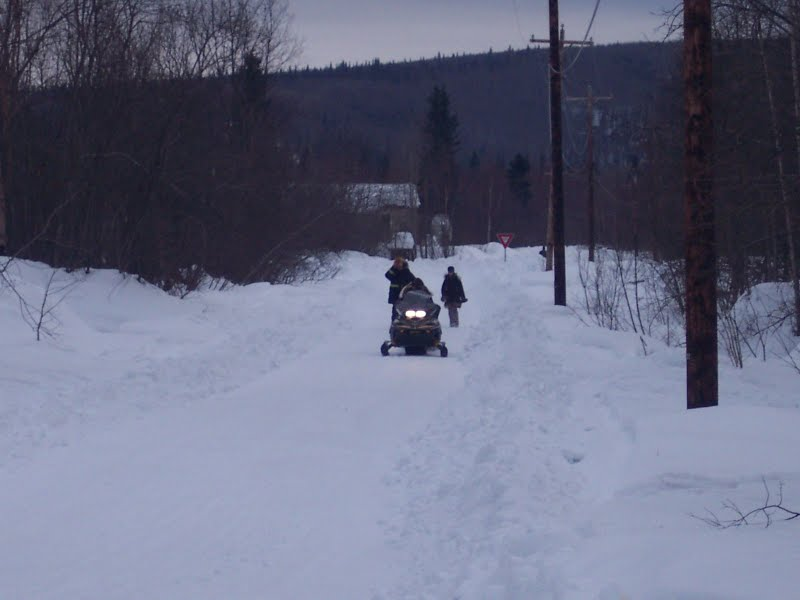
- Sleetmute in the winter

- Location within Alaska Location within North America Location within Earth
- Coordinates: 61°41′2″N 157°9′7″W
- Country: United States
- State: Alaska
- Census Area: Bethel

Government
  - State senator: Lyman Hoffman (D)
  - State rep.: Bryce Edgmon (I)

Area
  - Total: 104.72 sq mi (271.23 km^{2})
  - Land: 95.60 sq mi (247.59 km^{2})
  - Water: 9.12 sq mi (23.63 km^{2})

Population (2020)
  - Total: 95
  - Density: 0.98/sq mi (0.38/km^{2})
- Time zone: UTC-9 (Alaska (AKST))
  - Summer (DST): UTC-8 (AKDT)
- ZIP codes: 99668
- Area code: 907
- FIPS code: 02-71090

Sleetmute (Central Yupik: Cellitemiut; Deg Xinag: Tovisq'oł) is a census-designated place (CDP) in Bethel Census Area, Alaska, United States. As of the 2020 census, Sleetmute had a population of 95.

The Sleetmute Airport (IATA: SLQ) is a small, one-runway serving the Sleetmute area. It has departures to Aniak and Stony River via Ryan Air. It also accepts arrivals from Anchorage and Port Alsworth.

== Geography and climate ==
Sleetmute is located on the east bank of the Kuskokwim River, 1.5 miles north of its junction with the Holitna River. It lies 79 miles east of Aniak, 166 miles northeast of Bethel, and 243 miles west of Anchorage.

According to the United States Census Bureau, the CDP has a total area of 105.3 square miles (273 km^{2}), of which, 99.5 square miles (258 km^{2}) of it is land and 5.8 square miles (15 km^{2}) of it (5.49%) is water. Climate data is sparse; the weather station was only operated in fourteen of the years between its setup in 1924 and its closure in 1963, and many of those years have incomplete records. Nearby Aniak has a similar climate with more complete records.

Climate data for Sleetmute
Month	Jan	Feb	Mar	Apr	May	Jun	Jul	Aug	Sep	Oct	Nov	Dec	Year
Mean daily maximum °F (°C)	9.5 (−12.5)	19.6 (−6.9)	23.6 (−4.7)	37.7 (3.2)	54.9 (12.7)	63.7 (17.6)	65.0 (18.3)	61.9 (16.6)	52.8 (11.6)	34.2 (1.2)	18.2 (−7.7)	6.9 (−13.9)	37.3 (3.0)
Mean daily minimum °F (°C)	−7.0 (−21.7)	0.6 (−17.4)	−0.3 (−17.9)	17.2 (−8.2)	33.9 (1.1)	40.7 (4.8)	45.6 (7.6)	44.7 (7.1)	35.3 (1.8)	19.4 (−7.0)	6.0 (−14.4)	−7.7 (−22.1)	19.0 (−7.2)
Average precipitation inches (mm)	1.73 (44)	0.58 (15)	0.66 (17)	1.05 (27)	1.59 (40)	2.03 (52)	3.72 (94)	3.48 (88)	3.81 (97)	1.45 (37)	1.23 (31)	1.29 (33)	22.62 (575)
Average snowfall inches (cm)	19.7 (50)	8.4 (21)	3.3 (8.4)	4.3 (11)	0.0 (0.0)	0.0 (0.0)	0.0 (0.0)	0.0 (0.0)	0.4 (1.0)	0.3 (0.76)	13.8 (35)	16.2 (41)	66.4 (168.16)
Source: http://www.wrcc.dri.edu/cgi-bin/cliMAIN.pl?ak8554

== Demographics ==
Historical population
Census	Pop.	Note	%±
1930	133		—
1940	86		−35.3%
1950	120		39.5%
1960	122		1.7%
1970	109		−10.7%
1980	107		−1.8%
1990	106		−0.9%
2000	100		−5.7%
2010	86		−14.0%
2020	95		10.5%
U.S. Decennial Census

Sleetmute first appeared on the 1930 U.S. Census as the unincorporated village of "Sleitmut." In 1940, it returned as "Sleitmute." In 1950, and in every successive census, it has returned as Sleetmute. In 1980, it was made a census-designated place (CDP).

As of the census of 2000, there were 100 people, 33 households, and 25 families residing in the CDP. The population density was 1.0 inhabitant per square mile (0.39/km^{2}). There were 51 housing units at an average density of 0.5 per square mile (0.19/km^{2}). The racial makeup of the CDP was 11.00% White and 89.00% Native American.

There were 33 households, out of which 33.3% had children under the age of 18 living with them, 45.5% were married couples living together, 21.2% had a female householder with no husband present, and 24.2% were non-families. 24.2% of all households were made up of individuals, and 9.1% had someone living alone who was 65 years of age or older. The average household size was 3.03 and the average family size was 3.56.

In the CDP, the population was spread out, with 33.0% under the age of 18, 8.0% from 18 to 24, 17.0% from 25 to 44, 29.0% from 45 to 64, and 13.0% who were 65 years of age or older. The median age was 37 years. For every 100 females, there were 138.1 males. For every 100 females age 18 and over, there were 109.4 males.

The median income for a household in the CDP was $15,000, and the median income for a family was $20,417. Males had a median income of $6,250 versus $0 for females. The per capita income for the CDP was $8,150. There were 47.4% of families and 57.7% of the population living below the poverty line, including 78.6% of under eighteens and 25.0% of those over 64.

== Education ==
The Kuspuk School District operates a K-12 rural school, Jack Egnaty, Sr. School.

== In popular culture ==
Sleetmute is mentioned in multiple episodes of the television series Northern Exposure. For example, in the episode "Midnight Sun", Dr. Fleishman coaches the town of Cicely's basketball team and tries to end Sleetmute's domination.
