= Homer Airport =

Airport in Alaska, United States

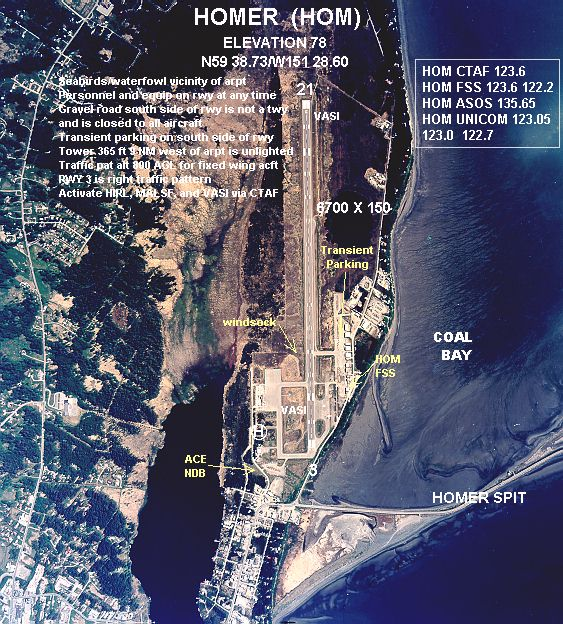
- IATA: HOM; ICAO: PAHO; FAA LID: HOM

Summary
- Airport type: Public
- Owner: State of Alaska DOT&PF - Central Region
- Serves: Homer, Alaska
- Elevation AMSL: 84 ft (26 m)
- Coordinates: 59°38′44″N 151°28′36″W

Map
- Location within Alaska

Runways
Direction	Length		Surface
Direction	ft	m	Surface
4/22	6,701	2,042	Asphalt

Statistics (2006)
- Aircraft operations: 49,821
- Based aircraft: 93
- Source: Federal Aviation Administration

Homer Airport (IATA: HOM, ICAO: PAHO, FAA LID: HOM) is a state-owned public-use airport located two nautical miles (4 km) east of the central business district of Homer, a town in the Kenai Peninsula Borough of the U.S. state of Alaska.

== Facilities and aircraft ==
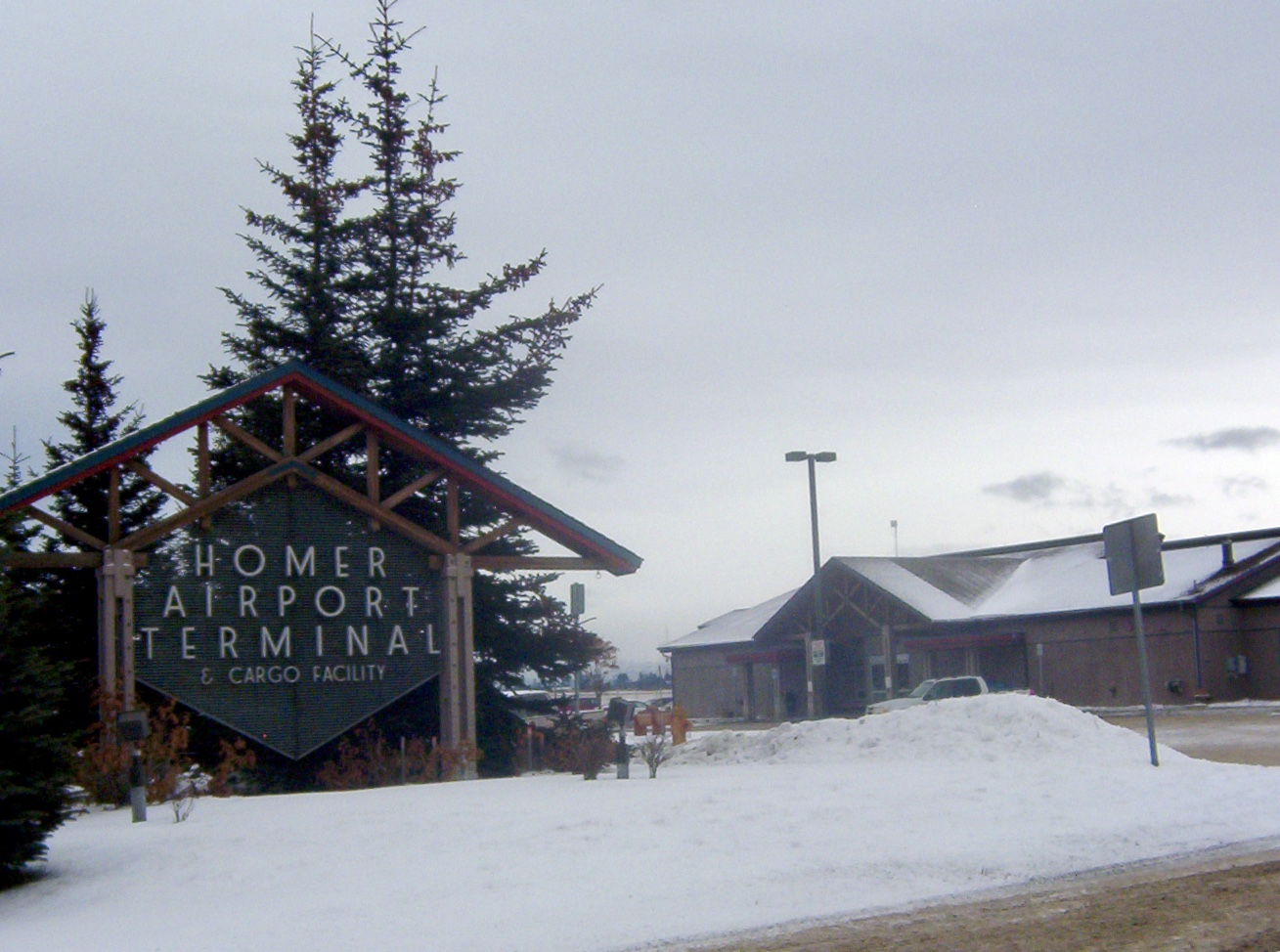
Main terminal on FAA road

Homer Airport covers an area of 1,040 acres (420 ha) at an elevation of 84 feet (26 m) above mean sea level. It has one runway designated 4/22 with a 6,701 x 150 ft (2,042 x 46 m) asphalt pavement, and a facility for floatplanes on nearby Beluga Lake.

For the 12-month period ending January 1, 2006, the airport had 49,821 aircraft operations, an average of 136 per day: 46% scheduled commercial, 32% air taxi, 22% general aviation and <1% military. At that time there were 93 aircraft based at this airport: 90% single-engine, 4% multi-engine, 3% helicopter and 2% ultralight.

The FAA completed a new master plan for the airport in 2006, and expansion and safety improvements are ongoing. The plan called for a new haul out area for floatplanes, a public-use helipad, a building for managing rescue and firefighting operations based at the airport, and other general improvements.

== Airlines and destinations ==
Airlines	Destinations
Aleutian Airways	Anchorage
Smokey Bay Air	Nanwalek, Port Graham, Seldovia

There are also numerous sightseeing and fly-in fishing and hunting air service operations.

== Statistics ==
Top airlines at HOM (September 2021 - August 2022)
Rank	Airline	Passengers	Percent of market share
1	Ravn Alaska	40,690	76.56%
2	Smokey Bay Air	8,630	16.25%
3	Corvus Airlines	3,810	7.17%
4	Iliamna Air Taxi	10	0.03%

Top domestic destinations (Sep. 2021 - Aug. 2022)
Rank	City	Airport	Passengers	Carriers
1	Anchorage, AK	Ted Stevens Anchorage International Airport	22,510	Ravn Alaska
2	Nanwalek, AK	Nanwalek Airport	1,910	Smokey Bay Air
3	Port Graham, AK	Port Graham Airport	1,210	Smokey Bay Air

== Historical airline service ==
Pacific Northern Airlines (PNA, the successor to Woodley Airways which began operations in Alaska in 1932) was serving the airport in 1950 with Douglas DC-3 service operated daily on a roundtrip routing of Anchorage (ANC) - Homer - Kodiak, AK as well as a DC-3 flight operated four days a week on a roundtrip routing of Anchorage - Kenai, AK - Kasilof, AK - Ninilchik, AK - Homer. By 1965, Pacific Northern was operating four engine Lockheed Constellation propliners on all of its flights serving the airport with three flights operated every weekday on nonstop services to Anchorage, Kenai and Kodiak with the flight to Kenai continuing on to Anchorage. Also in 1965, Pacific Northern was offering direct connecting Constellation service twice a day from Homer via Anchorage to its Boeing 720 jetliner flights to Seattle (SEA). In 1967, Western Airlines, a major air carrier based in Los Angeles, acquired Pacific Northern and continued to serve Homer following the merger of the two airlines with Lockheed Constellation flights nonstop twice daily to both Anchorage and Kodiak as well as twice weekly Constellation service nonstop to King Salmon, AK. In 1968, Western was offering direct connecting Constellation service from Homer via Anchorage to its Boeing 720 and Boeing 720B jetliner flights from ANC to Seattle (SEA), San Francisco (SFO) and Los Angeles (LAX). Western was still serving Homer in 1970 and operated four engine Lockheed L-188 Electra turboprops into the airport at one point; however, Western then ceased serving Homer during the early 1970s.

=== Historical airline jet service ===
According to the Official Airline Guide (OAG), during the late 1970s and early 1980s Wien Air Alaska operated Boeing 737-200 jet service from the airport primarily nonstop to Anchorage (ANC). The June 15, 1979 Wien system timetable lists 737 jet flights operated twice a week from Homer nonstop to both Anchorage and Kodiak, AK. Wien had previously served Homer during the mid 1970s with Fairchild F-27B turboprops but had ceased operating 737 jet service into the airport by early 1982.

== Notable incidents ==
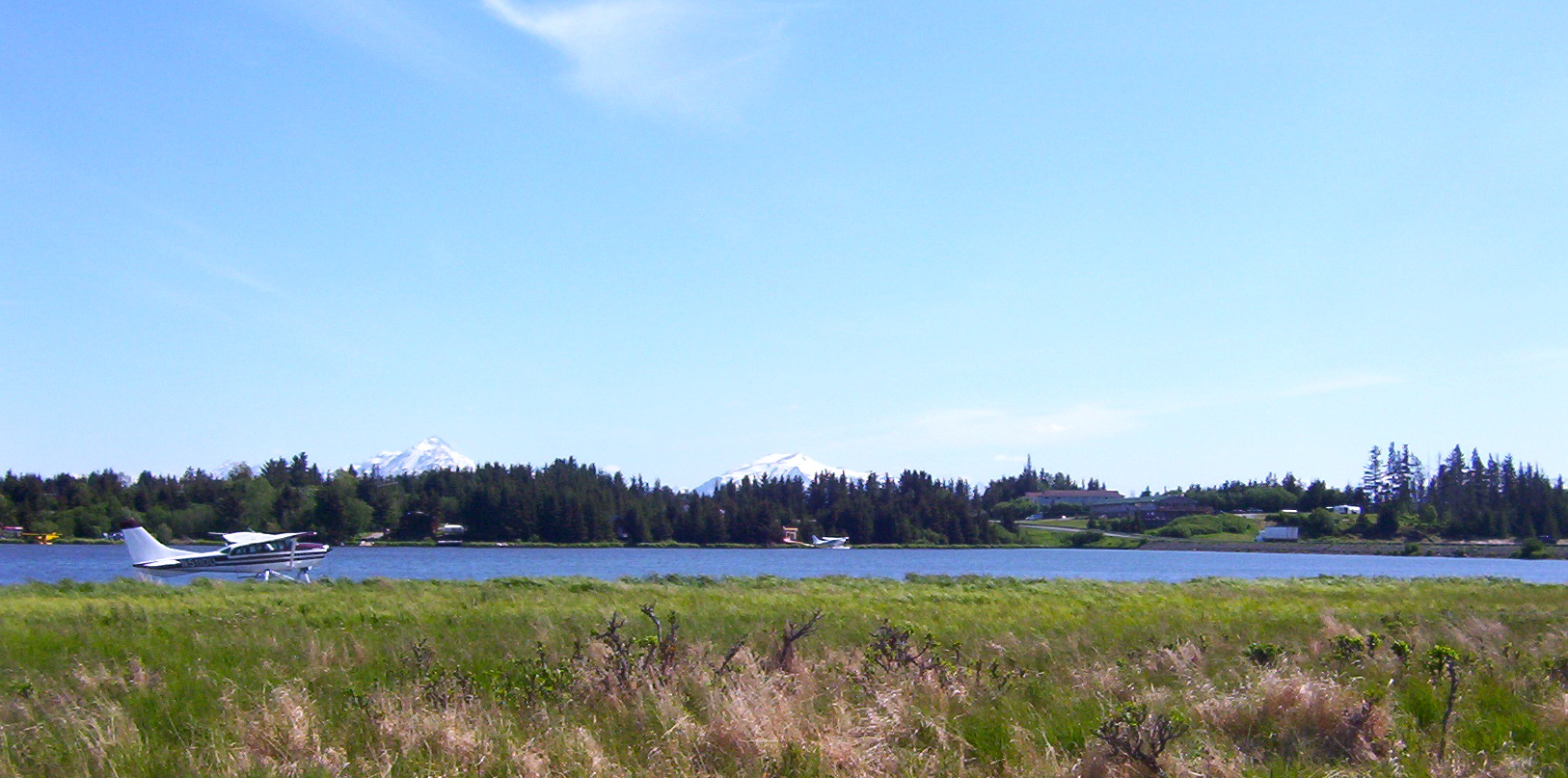
In the summer months, Beluga Lake is a very active floatplane airport.

- In November 1987, a Beechcraft 1900C operated by Ryan Air Service Flight 103 (a local operator) with 22 passengers and crew, crashed while arriving from Kodiak, killing 18 and injuring four due to overloading and a center of gravity too aft of specifications.
- In March 2006, agents from the US Marshal service, in conjunction with local police, attempted to apprehend a violent methamphetamine dealer, Jason Karlo Anderson, who had fled from charges in Minnesota. The suspect had rented a car at the Homer airport, and the rental agent assisted police in luring him back to the airport. Marshals were unaware that the entire Homer High School choir, over 100 students, would be departing for a trip at the same time as the setup. The suspect apparently panicked when he arrived and discovered so many people at the small airport, and a shootout ensued in the parking lot after marshals boxed in his car. Karlo committed suicide, but not before severely wounding his own infant son with a gunshot to the head. The infant's mother, Cheryl Dietzmann, contested the finding that Anderson shot his own son and in February 2009 filed against the U.S. Marshals asking for $75 million in damages. In July 2011 the Marshals settled with Dietzman for $3.5 million. An additional case against the individual Homer Police officers and the city of Homer was concluded in March 2013, with a verdict that the officers did not in fact injure the children and may have actually saved their lives by shooting Anderson.
- A Cessna 206 crashed in Beluga Lake in Homer on landing, on July 10, 2012. Former Alaska state Rep. Cheryll Heinze died as a result of the crash. Four others were injured.
- In October 2013, a Beechcraft 1900C operated by Era Aviation experienced a landing gear failure and slid to a stop on its belly. No injuries were reported.
- The suspect arrested for murder in connection with the Disappearance of Anesha Murnane allegedly threw her cellphone into Beluga Lake.

== See also ==
- List of airports in Alaska
