= PASL =

PASL may refer to:

- Professional Arena Soccer League (PASL-Pro), now the MASL
- Premier Arena Soccer League
- Sleetmute Airport (ICAO location indicator: PASL), in Sleetmute, Alaska, United States
