= SHX =

SHX or shx may refer to:

- SHX, the IATA and FAA LID code for Shageluk Airport, Alaska, United States
- SHX, the Pinyin code for Shanghai West railway station, Shanghai, China
- shx, the ISO 639-3 code for She language, China
