= Red Devil Airport =

- IATA: RDV; ICAO: none; FAA LID: RDV

Summary
- Airport type: Public
- Owner: Alaska DOT&PF - Central Region
- Serves: Red Devil, Alaska
- Elevation AMSL: 174 ft (53 m)
- Coordinates: 61°47′17″N 157°21′01″W

Map
- Location of airport in Alaska

Runways
Direction	Length		Surface
Direction	ft	m	Surface
10/28	4,801	1,463	Gravel
- Source: Federal Aviation Administration

Red Devil Airport (IATA: RDV, FAA LID: RDV) is a public use airport located one nautical mile (1.85 km) northwest of the central business district of Red Devil, in the Bethel Census Area of the U.S. state of Alaska.

== Facilities ==
Red Devil Airport covers an area of 311 acres (126 ha) at the elevation of 174 feet (53 m) above mean sea level. It has one runway designated 10/28 with a gravel surface measuring 4,801 by 75 feet (1,463 x 23 m).

== Airlines and destinations ==
Airlines	Destinations
Ryan Air	Aniak, Sleetmute, Stony River

== Accidents and incidents ==
- On 24 March 1971, Douglas C-47B N49319 of Vanderpool Flying Service was damaged beyond economic repair in a landing accident. The aircraft was on an executive flight from Bethel Airport.

== See also ==
- List of airports in Alaska
