= SLQ =

SLQ may refer to

- SkyLink Express, a Canadian cargo airline, by ICAO code
- Sleetmute Airport, Alaska, by IATA code
- St. Lawrence and Atlantic Railroad, Canada, by reporting mark
- St Leonards Warrior Square railway station, a railway station in Sussex, England
- State Library of Queensland, Australia
- Standing Liberty quarter, a 25-cent coin that was struck by the United States Mint from 1916 to 1930

slq is the ISO 639 code of the Salchuq language.
