= Aniak Airport =

Airport in Alaska, United States

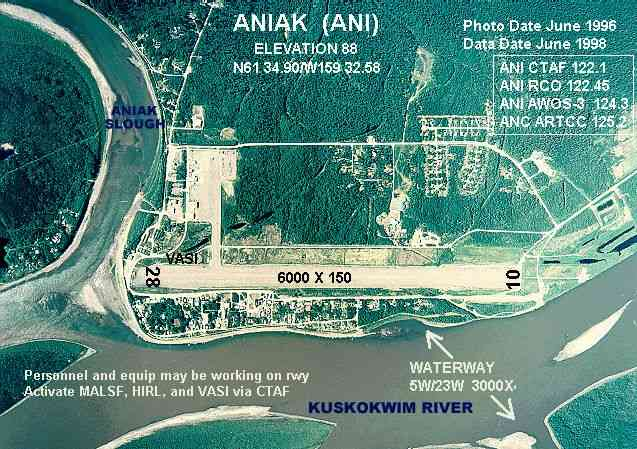
- IATA: ANI; ICAO: PANI; FAA LID: ANI

Summary
- Airport type: Public
- Owner: State of Alaska DOT&PF - Central Region
- Serves: Aniak, Alaska
- Elevation AMSL: 89 ft (27 m)
- Coordinates: 61°34′54″N 159°32′35″W

Map
- Location of airport in Alaska

Runways
Direction	Length		Surface
Direction	ft	m	Surface
11/29	6,001	1,829	Asphalt
5W/23W	3,000	914	Water

Statistics (2015)
- Aircraft operations: 2,600 (2014)
- Based aircraft: 18
- Passengers: 25,440
- Freight: 8,204,000 lbs
- Source: Federal Aviation Administration

Aniak Airport (IATA: ANI, ICAO: PANI, FAA LID: ANI) is a state-owned public-use airport located in Aniak, a city in the Bethel Census Area of the U.S. state of Alaska. Its location on the Kuskokwim River also allows for the landing of seaplanes.

According to Federal Aviation Administration records, the airport had 18,526 passenger boardings (enplanements) in the 2008 calendar year, 16,255 in 2009 and 16,394 in 2010. It was included in the National Plan of Integrated Airport Systems for 2011–2015, which categorized it as a "primary commercial service" airport (more than 10,000 enplanements per year).

== Facilities and aircraft ==
Aniak Airport covers an area of 1,722 acres (697 ha) at an elevation of 89 feet (27 m) above mean sea level. It has one asphalt paved runway designated 11/29 (formerly 10/28) which measures 6,000 by 150 feet (1,829 m × 46 m). It also has one seaplane landing area designated 5W/23W on an area of water measuring 3,000 by 400 feet (910 by 120 m). There are 19 aircraft based at the airport: 89.5% single-engine and 10.5% multi-engine.

== Airlines and destinations ==
=== Passenger ===
The following airlines offer scheduled passenger service at this airport:

Airlines	Destinations
Ryan Air	Anchorage, Anvik, Bethel, Chuathbaluk, Crooked Creek, Grayling, Holy Cross, Kalskag, Red Devil, Russian Mission, Shageluk, Sleetmute, Stony River

=== Cargo ===
Airlines	Destinations
Everts Air Cargo	Anchorage
Northern Air Cargo	Anchorage

=== Statistics ===
Top airlines at ANI (September 2021 - August 2022)
Rank	Airline	Passengers	Percent of market share
1	Ravn Alaska	4,410	55.15%
2	Ryan Air	3,170	39.72%
3	Corvus Airlines	400	5.02%
4	Yute Commuter Service	10	0.11%

Top domestic destinations (Sep. 2021 - Aug. 2022)
Rank	City	Airport	Passengers	Carriers
1	Anchorage, AK	Ted Stevens Anchorage International Airport	2,620	Ravn Alaska, Ryan Air
2	Bethel, AK	Bethel Airport	430	Ryan Air
3	Kalskag, AK	Kalskag Airport	240	Ryan Air
4	Holy Cross, AK	Holy Cross Airport	180	Ryan Air
5	Russian Mission, AK	Russian Mission Airport	100	Ryan Air
6	Chuathbaluk, AK	Chuathbaluk Airport	50	Ryan Air
7	Grayling, AK	Grayling Airport	40	Ryan Air
8	Shageluk, AK	Shageluk Airport	40	Ryan Air
9	Anvik, AK	Anvik Airport	40	Ryan Air
10	St. Mary's, AK	St. Mary's Airport	30	

== See also ==
- List of airports in Alaska
