= KGX =

KGX can mean:

- The SIL code for the Kamaru language of Sulawesi
- FAA identifier for the Grayling Airport of Grayling, Alaska
- The station code for London King's Cross railway station
- The name for Palm Springs radio station KKGX
