= Kalskag, Alaska =

Kalskag, Alaska may refer to:

- Lower Kalskag, Alaska
- Upper Kalskag, Alaska
- Kalskag Airport, serving both communities
