= CJX =

CJX can refer to:

- Crooked Creek Airport, an airport in Crooked Creek, Alaska, U.S.
- Jiangxi Air, a low-cost Chinese airline, by ICAO code
- Changjiang Li Autonomous County, a county in Hainan province, China; see List of administrative divisions of Hainan
