= Kalskag Airport =

- IATA: KLG; ICAO: PALG; FAA LID: KLG

Summary
- Airport type: Public
- Owner: State of Alaska DOT&PF - Central Region
- Location: Kalskag, Alaska
- Elevation AMSL: 55 ft (17 m)
- Coordinates: 61°32′11″N 160°20′29″W

Map
- Location of airport in Alaska

Runways
Direction	Length		Surface
Direction	ft	m	Surface
6/24	3,172	967	Gravel
- Source: Federal Aviation Administration

Kalskag Airport (IATA: KLG, ICAO: PALG, FAA LID: KLG) is a public airport located one mile (1.6 km) west of the central business district of Upper Kalskag, a city in the Bethel Census Area of the U.S. state of Alaska. The airport is owned by the state. It is situated on the Kuskokwim River, between the cities of Upper Kalskag and Lower Kalskag.

== Facilities ==
Kalskag Airport covers an area of 160 acres (65 ha) which contains one runway (6/24) with a gravel surface measuring 3,200 x 75 ft (975 x 23 m).

== Airlines and destinations ==
Airlines	Destinations
Ryan Air	Aniak, Russian Mission

== See also ==
- List of airports in Alaska
