= Nanwalek Airport =

Nanwalek Airport (formerly English Bay Airport)
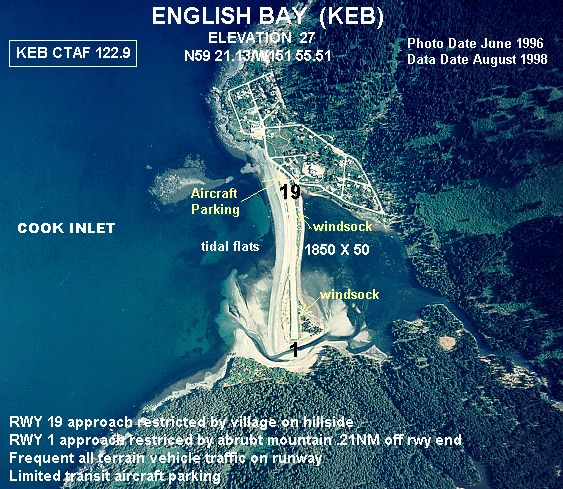
- IATA: KEB; ICAO: PAAW; FAA LID: KEB

Summary
- Airport type: Public
- Owner: State of Alaska DOT&PF – Central Region
- Location: Nanwalek, Alaska (formerly English Bay)
- Elevation AMSL: 27 ft (8.2 m)
- Coordinates: 59°21′04″N 151°55′34″W

Map
- Location of airport in Alaska

Runways
Direction	Length		Surface
Direction	ft	m	Surface
1/19	1,850	564	Gravel

Statistics (2002)
- Aircraft operations: 3,100
- Source: Federal Aviation Administration

Nanwalek Airport (IATA: KEB, ICAO: PAAW, FAA LID: KEB) is a state-owned public-use airport located in Nanwalek (formerly English Bay), an unincorporated community in the Kenai Peninsula Borough of the US state of Alaska. It was formerly known as English Bay Airport.

== Facilities and aircraft ==
Nanwalek Airport covers an area of 14 acres (5.7 ha) which contains one gravel runway (1/19) measuring 1,850 x 50 ft (564 x 15 m).

For 12-month period ending December 31, 2002, the airport had 3,100 aircraft operations, an average of 8 per day: 97% air taxi and 3% general aviation.

== Airlines and destinations ==
Airlines	Destinations
Smokey Bay Air	Port Graham

This airport is considered the shortest runway in the USA used by US commuter airlines. The runway is 1850 feet, however the Department of Transportation has closed the first 1000 feet of Runway 19 making the usable runway only 850 feet.

== Incidents ==
A Cessna 206 belonging to Smokey Bay Air crashed near the Nanwalek Airport, after an aborted landing, on July 11, 2003. The plane crashed into the sea about 200 yards offshore. The pilot, Stephen Finley, 49 of Hopewell, N.J. died in the crash. He was the only person on board.

A Cessna 206 belonging to Smokey Bay Air crashed near Nanwalek Airport on takeoff on December 15, 2011. The plane crashed into the sea about 100 ft (30 m) from the shore, and the four persons who had been on board swam to the shore. The crash is being investigated by the National Transportation Safety Board.

A Smokey Bay Air Cessna 207 Turbo Skywagon crashed following a go-around attempt at Nanwalek Airport on April 28, 2025. The pilot and one passenger were killed. A second passenger survived in critical condition. During the go-around attempt, the airplane entered a steep left bank near the north end of the airport before losing control and spiraling to the ground. According to the NTSB preliminary report, a company pilot in the vicinity reported the accident pilot radioing that he was going around due to "something on the runway.". The same aircraft, N91025, was involved in an incident at Nanwalek causing substantial damage on 23 August 2016.

== In popular culture ==
Games

- Nanwalek Airport is featured as a hand crafted Airport in Microsoft Flight Simulator (2020 video game).

== See also ==
- List of airports in Alaska
