= Russian Mission Airport =

- IATA: RSH; ICAO: PARS; FAA LID: RSH

Summary
- Airport type: Public
- Owner: Alaska DOT&PF - Northern Region
- Serves: Russian Mission, Alaska
- Elevation AMSL: 51 ft / 16 m
- Coordinates: 61°46′30″N 161°19′10″W

Map
- Location of airport in Alaska

Runways
Direction	Length		Surface
Direction	ft	m	Surface
17/35	3,600	1,097	Gravel
18W/36W	3,000	914	Water
- Source: Federal Aviation Administration

Russian Mission Airport (IATA: RSH, ICAO: PARS, FAA LID: RSH) is a state-owned public-use airport located in Russian Mission, a city in the Kusilvak Census Area of the U.S. state of Alaska.

== Facilities ==
Russian Mission Airport covers an area of 143 acres (58 ha) at an elevation of 51 feet (16 m) above mean sea level. It has one runway designated 17/35 with a 3,600 by 100 ft (1,097 x 30 m) gravel surface. It also has a seaplane landing area designated 18W/36W which covers an area of the Yukon River measuring 3,000 by 500 ft (914 x 152 m).

== Airlines and destinations ==
Airlines	Destinations
Ryan Air	Aniak

== Accidents and incidents ==
On Wednesday, August 31, 2016, a collision occurred near Russian Mission Airport involving a Ravn Connect Cessna Caravan 208B EX aircraft that had been leased from Hageland Aviation Services and a Renfro's Alaskan Adventures Piper PA-18 Super Cub, killing the three people on board the Cessna Caravan 208B and the two on board the Piper aircraft. The Ravn Connect flight was a commercial one from Russian Mission Airport to Marshall Don Hunter Sr. Airport in Marshall, while the Renfro's Alaskan Adventures aircraft was on a charter flight from Bethel Airport to a hunting location.

== See also ==
- List of airports in Alaska
