= Stony River, Alaska =

Stony River, Alaska Gidighuyghatno’ Xidochagg Qay (Degexit'an) K'qizaghetnu Hdakaq' (Denaʼina)
- Census-designated place
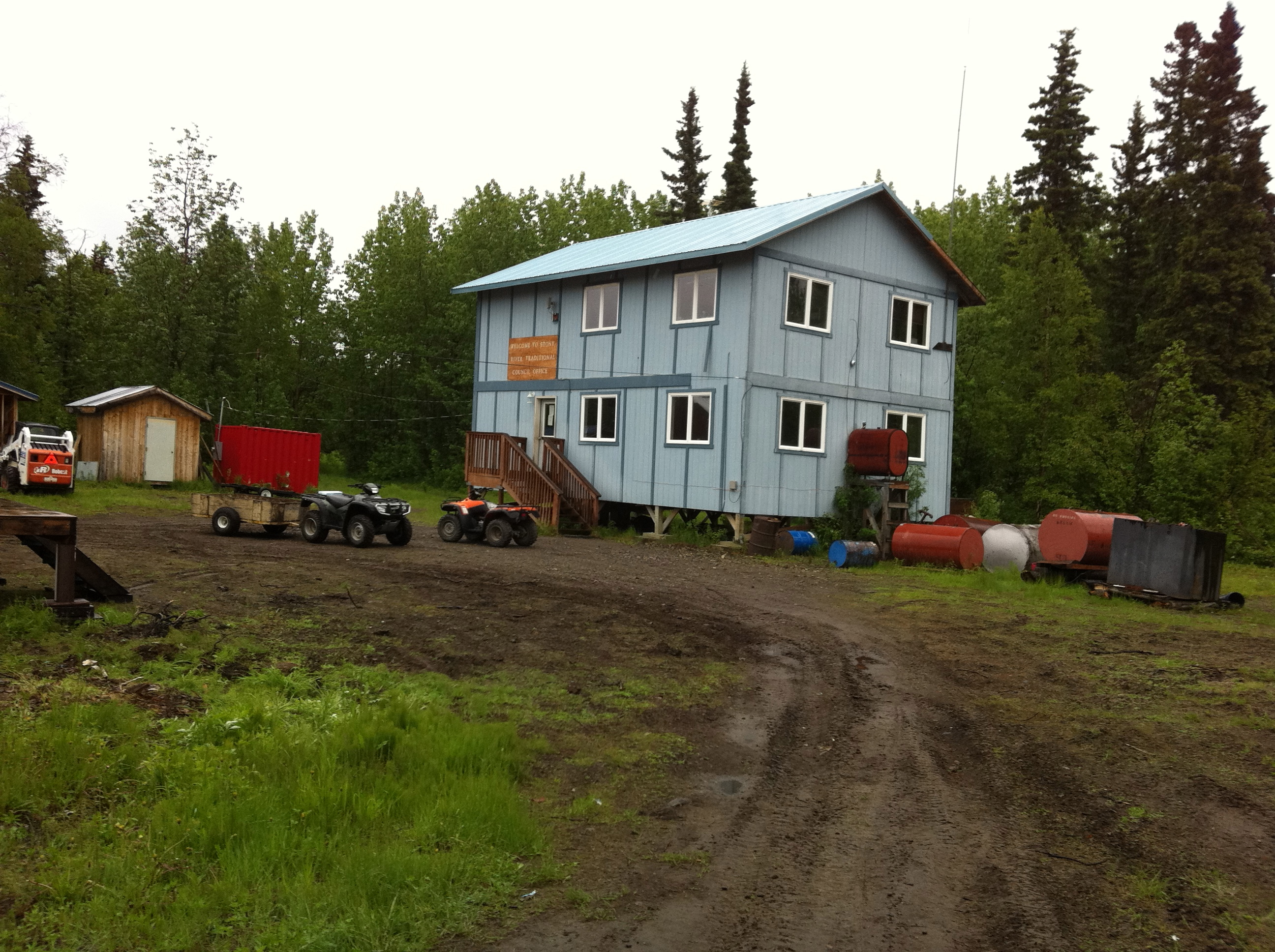
- Stony River Tribal Office

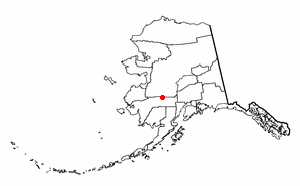
- Location of Stony River, Alaska
- Coordinates: 61°47′15″N 156°35′28″W
- Country: United States
- State: Alaska
- Census Area: Bethel

Government
  - State senator: Lyman Hoffman (D)
  - State rep.: Bryce Edgmon (I)

Area
  - Total: 4.56 sq mi (11.80 km^{2})
  - Land: 3.14 sq mi (8.13 km^{2})
  - Water: 1.42 sq mi (3.68 km^{2})

Population (2020)
  - Total: 57
  - Density: 18.2/sq mi (7.02/km^{2})
- Time zone: UTC-9 (Alaska (AKST))
  - Summer (DST): UTC-8 (AKDT)
- ZIP code: 99557
- Area code: 907
- FIPS code: 02-73400

Stony River (Gidighuyghatno’ Xidochagg Qay’ in Deg Xinag, K'qizaghetnu Hdakaq’ in Dena'ina) is a census-designated place (CDP) in Bethel Census Area, Alaska, United States. As of the 2020 census, Stony River had a population of 57.

Native inhabitants are mixed Athabaskan and Yup'ik ancestry of Alaska Native. Stony River village is the modern contact point between Yu'pik Eskimo and three distinct Athabaskan peoples: Deg Hit'an, Dena'ina, and Upper Kuskokwim. Today there is considerable multilingualism in Stony River village between Yu'pik and three distinct Athabaskan languages.

== Geography ==
The Stony River CDP is located at 61°47′15″N 156°35′28″W (61.787592, -156.591194) on an island in the Kuskokwim River at the mouth of the Stony River, approximately 140 miles (230 km) northeast (upriver) of Bethel.

According to the United States Census Bureau, the CDP has a total area of 4.9 square miles (12.6 km^{2}), of which 3.1 square miles (8.0 km^{2}) is land and 1.8 square miles (4.6 km^{2}), or 36.71%, is water.

== Demographics ==
Historical population
Census	Pop.	Note	%±
1970	74		—
1980	62		−16.2%
1990	51		−17.7%
2000	61		19.6%
2010	54		−11.5%
2020	57		5.6%
U.S. Decennial Census

Stony River first appeared on the 1970 U.S. Census as an unincorporated village. It was made a census-designated place (CDP) in 1980.

As of the census of 2000, there were 61 people, 19 households, and 14 families residing in the CDP. The population density was 16.8 inhabitants per square mile (6.5/km^{2}). There were 25 housing units at an average density of 6.9 per square mile (2.7/km^{2}). The racial makeup of the CDP was 14.75% White, 78.69% Native American, and 6.56% from two or more races.

There were 19 households, out of which 52.6% had children under the age of 18 living with them, 47.4% were married couples living together, 5.3% had a female householder with no husband present, and 26.3% were non-families. 21.1% of all households were made up of individuals, and none had someone living alone who was 65 years of age or older. The average household size was 3.21 and the average family size was 3.64.

In the CDP, the population was spread out, with 39.3% under the age of 18, 13.1% from 18 to 24, 29.5% from 25 to 44, 11.5% from 45 to 64, and 6.6% who were 65 years of age or older. The median age was 24 years. For every 100 females, there were 117.9 males. For every 100 females age 18 and over, there were 131.3 males.

The median income for a household in the CDP was $20,714, and the median income for a family was $20,714. Males had a median income of $8,750 versus $0 for females. The per capita income for the CDP was $5,469. There were 38.9% of families and 38.7% of the population living below the poverty line, including 36.7% of those under 18 and none of those over 64.

== Education ==
The Kuspuk School District operates a K-12 rural school, Gusty Michael School.

== See also ==
- Stony River Airport
