= Ryan Air Services Flight 103 =

1987 aviation accident in Alaska

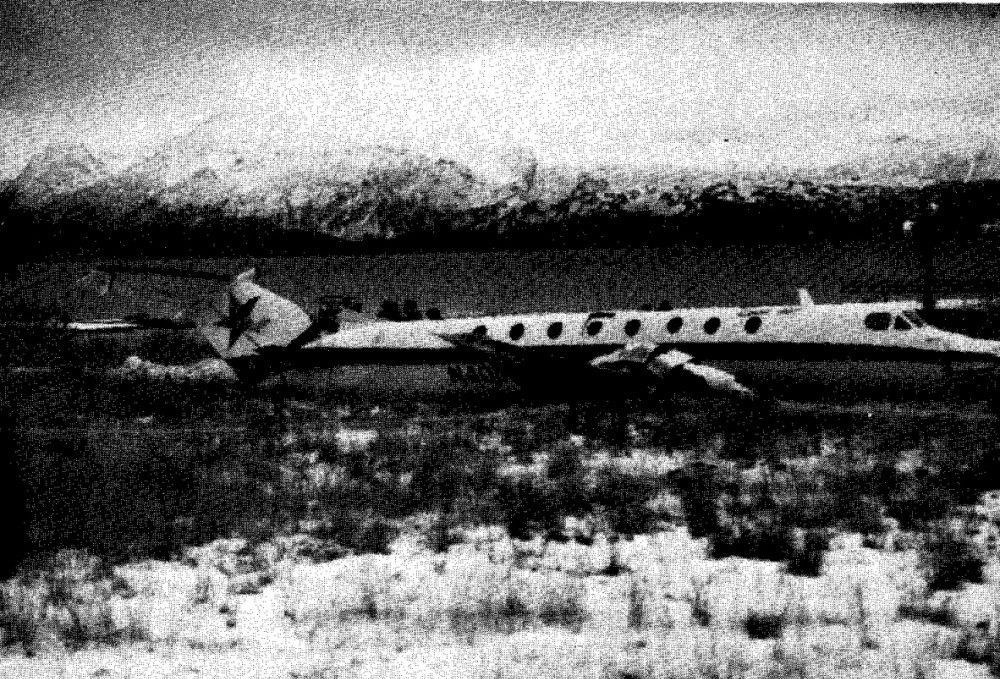
- The aircraft after crashing

Accident
- Date: 23 November 1987
- Summary: Lost control on landing due to incorrect loading
- Site: Near Homer Airport, Homer, Alaska, United States; 59°38.8′N 151°28.6′W

Aircraft
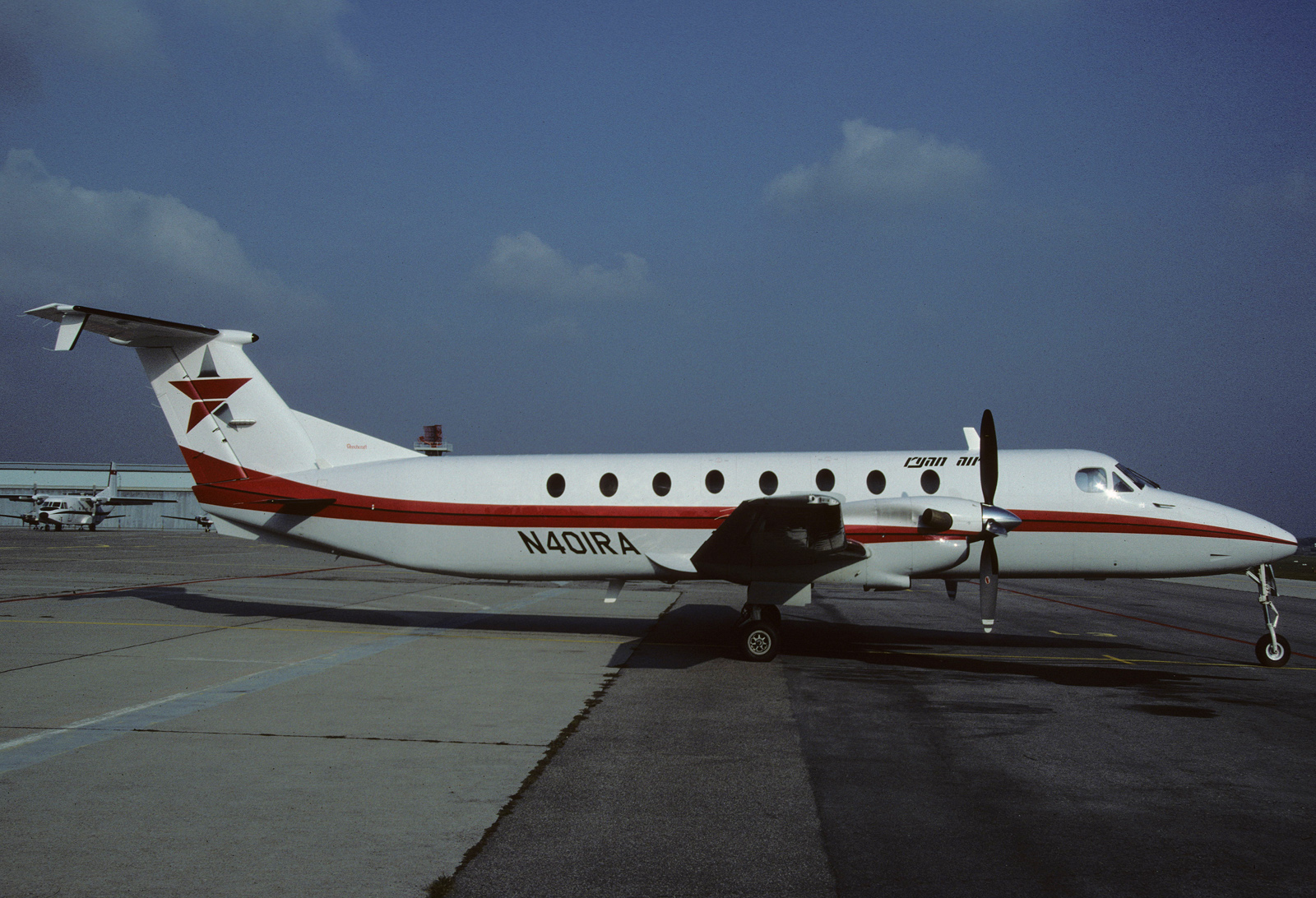
- N401RA, the aircraft involved in the accident, pictured in 1986
- Aircraft type: Beechcraft 1900C
- Operator: Ryan Air Services
- IATA flight No.: 7S103
- ICAO flight No.: RYA103
- Call sign: RYAN AIR 103
- Registration: N401RA
- Flight origin: Kodiak Airport, Kodiak, Alaska, United States
- Destination: Homer Airport, Homer, Alaska, United States
- Occupants: 21
- Passengers: 19
- Crew: 2
- Fatalities: 18
- Injuries: 3
- Survivors: 3

On 23 November 1987, Ryan Air Services Flight 103, a Beechcraft 1900C operating a domestic flight in Alaska from Kodiak Airport to Homer Airport, crashed near the runway at Homer Airport, while approaching it. Out of the 21 passengers and crew on board, 18 were killed. It was determined that the cause of the crash was an improper loading, which led to a loss of control during landing.

== Aircraft and crew ==
The aircraft involved was a Beechcraft 1900C, registered as N401RA, and manufactured in 1986. It did not carry a cockpit voice recorder nor a flight data recorder, and was not required to. The captain was 26-year-old Robert Deliman Jr. He joined Ryan Air Services in 1984, he had logged a total of 7,087 flight hours, 4,420 of which were logged on the Beechcraft 1900. The first officer was 40-year-old Gareth Stoltzfus. He had been hired by Ryan Air Services in 1986. He had logged a total of 10,532 flight hours, 300 of which were logged on the Beechcraft 1900. There were 19 passengers on board, 17 from Alaska and 2 from Wisconsin, of them many were hunters returning from deer hunting in Kodiak Island.

== Accident ==
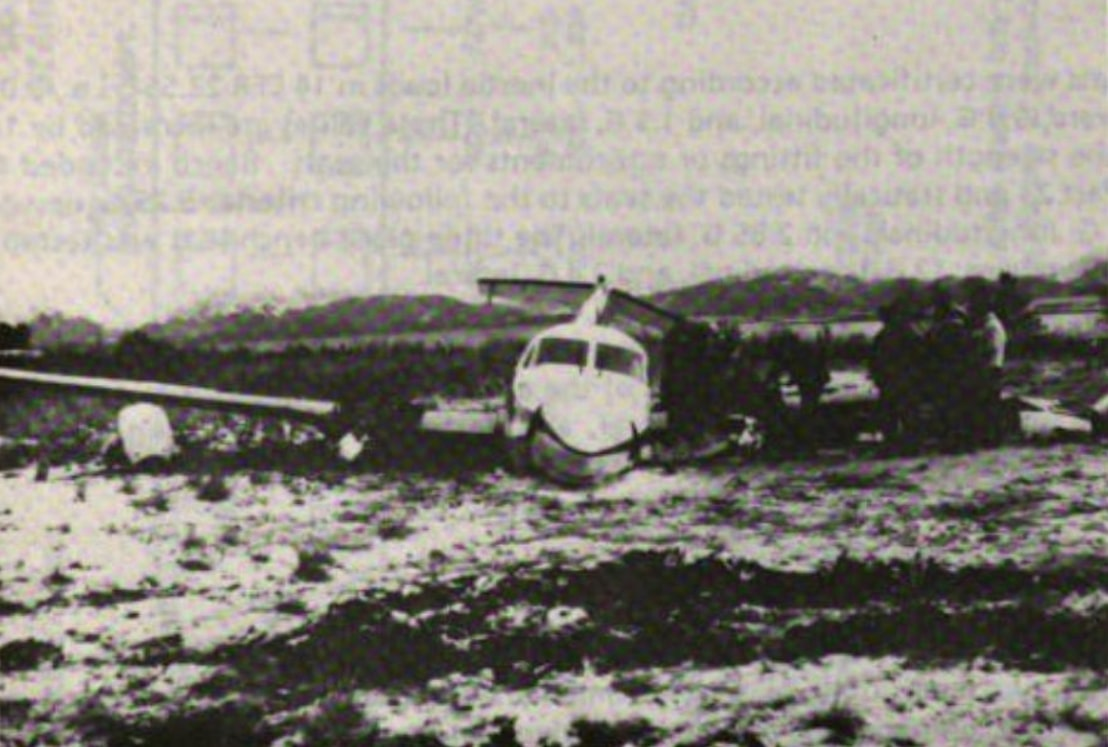
Another angle of the wreckage of Flight 103

At 5:42 pm local time, the aircraft took off fully loaded, with 19 passengers on board and 651 kg (1435 lb) of cargo, from runway 07 at Kodiak Airport. The aircraft had difficulties becoming airborne, and had to accelerate to 15 knots over V1 speed to lift off from the runway. The cruise went uneventfully. At 6:19 pm local time, Flight 103 was cleared to land following a DME approach, after a preceding plane cancelled an instrument approach. At 6:25 pm, the Homer Airport tower received a distress signal from the aircraft. Witnesses on the ground reported that Flight 103's approach did not appear to be normal. When the plane was about 24 meters (25 yards) from the runway, its wings rolled back and forth, and the aircraft started to fall steeply towards the ground. Flight 103 impacted terrain in a flat attitude, struck an airport perimeter fence, slid on its belly for a few meters (yards), and then stopped. Initially, the captain and 13 passengers were killed. The first officer and a passenger died while being transported to the hospitals, two other passengers died the next day in Anchorage. In the end, only three passengers of the 21 aboard survived. All fatalities were due to the blunt force of the impact.

== Investigation ==
The National Transportation Safety Board (NTSB) investigators found out that the plane was overweight by 30kg (66 lb) more than requested by the crew. During the landing approach, flap extension caused a loss of control by causing the aircraft's center of gravity to become displaced far aft. Icing conditions were present, and according to the NTSB may have contributed to an accelerated stall. The final report stated that the cause of the crash was improper loading, caused by the failure of the crew supervising it, which caused a loss of control in a landing configuration. Recommendations made by the NTSB were all regarding the internal configuration of the aircraft, which contributed in great part to the fatalities.

== See also ==
- Air Midwest Flight 5481
- Fine Air Flight 101
- National Airlines Flight 102
- UTA Flight 141
