= Cheryll Heinze =

American politician (1946–2012)

Member of the Alaska House of Representatives from the 24th district
- In office January 21, 2003 – January 9, 2005
- Preceded by: Pete Kott
- Succeeded by: Berta Gardner

Personal details
- Born: October 30, 1946 Wewoka, Oklahoma, U.S.
- Died: July 10, 2012 (aged 65) Homer, Alaska, U.S.
- Party: Republican
- Spouse: Harold Heinze

Cheryll Boren Heinze (October 30, 1946 – July 10, 2012) was a Republican member of the Alaska House of Representatives from 2003 to 2005. She comes from the Boren family of Oklahoma and Texas; she was first cousin to both Hoyt Axton and David Boren. She was an artist outside politics.

Heinze died on July 10, 2012, when the Cessna 206 she and four other people were traveling in flipped upon landing in Beluga Lake, near Homer Airport.
