= Air Midwest Flight 5481 =

2003 aviation accident in North Carolina

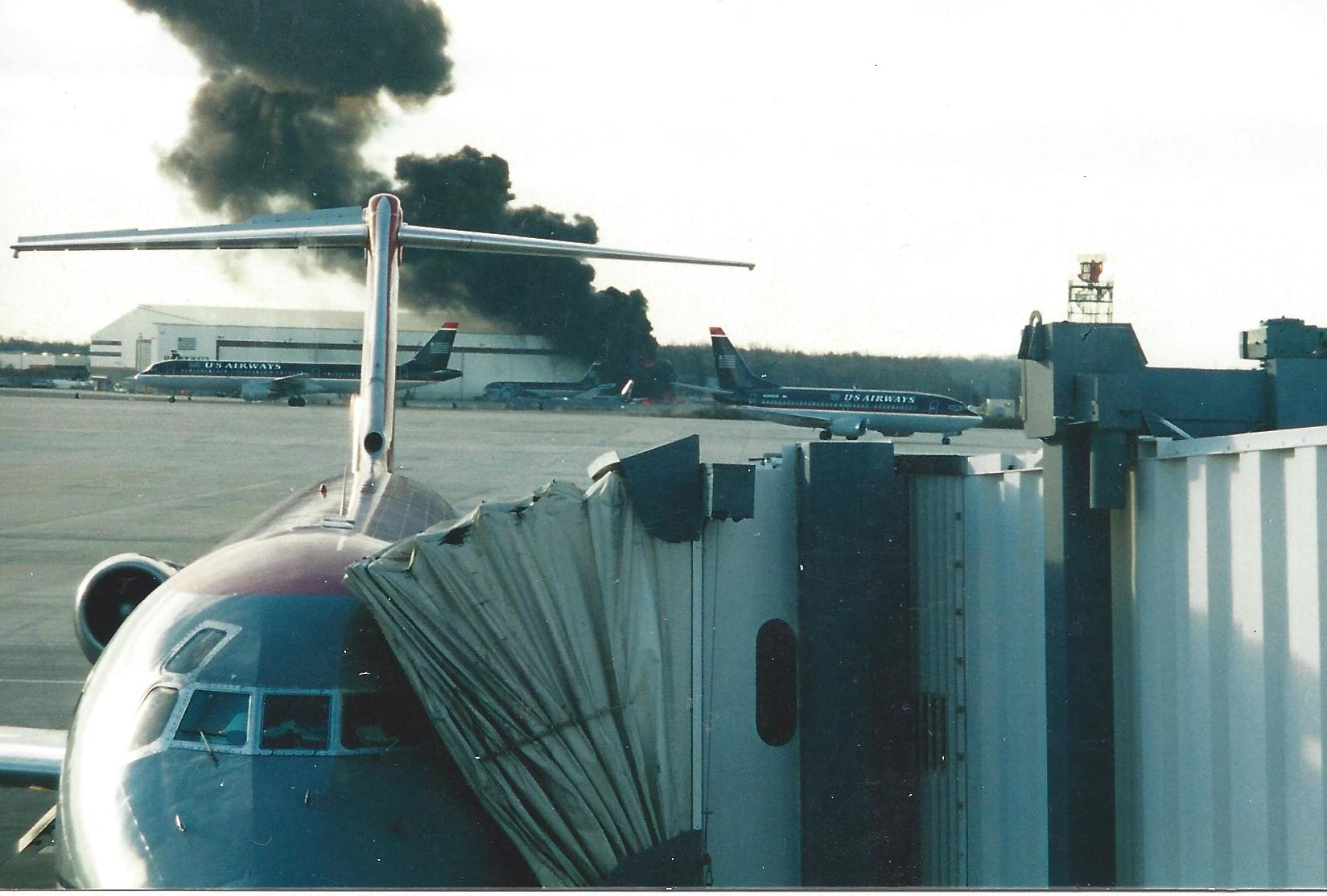
- Smoke rising from the crash site in the background

Accident
- Date: January 8, 2003
- Summary: Stall due to maintenance error, overloading
- Site: Charlotte Douglas International Airport, Charlotte, North Carolina, United States; 35°12′25″N 80°56′46.85″W
- Total fatalities: 21
- Total injuries: 1

Aircraft
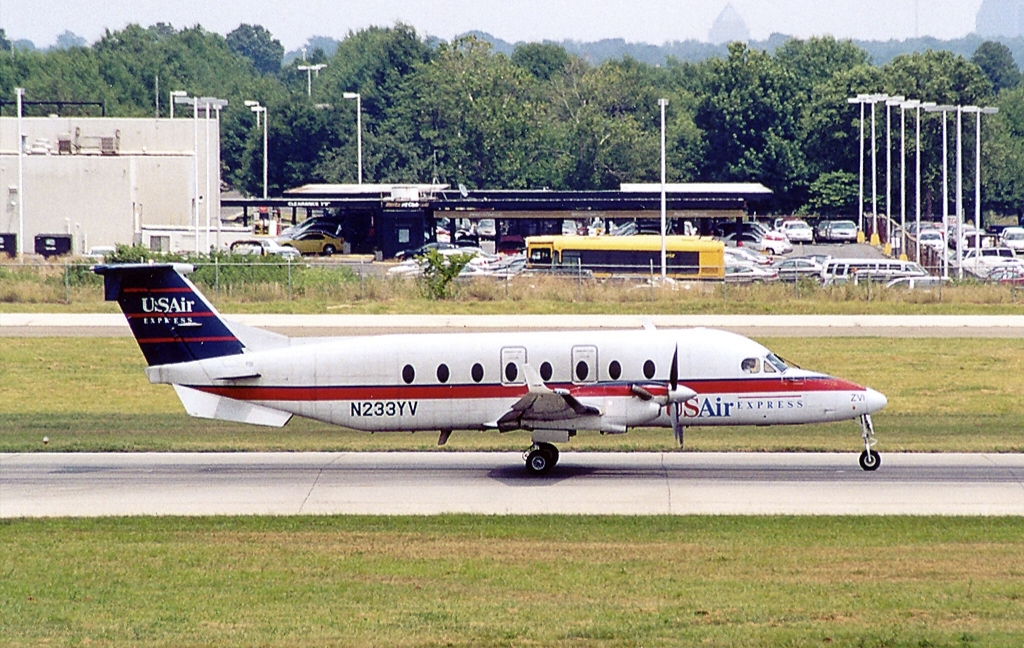
- N233YV, the aircraft involved in the accident, seen in 2002
- Aircraft type: Beechcraft 1900D
- Operator: Air Midwest on behalf of US Airways Express
- IATA flight No.: ZV5481
- ICAO flight No.: AMW5481
- Call sign: AIR MIDWEST 5481
- Registration: N233YV
- Flight origin: Charlotte Douglas International Airport
- Destination: Greenville–Spartanburg International Airport
- Occupants: 21
- Passengers: 19
- Crew: 2
- Fatalities: 21
- Survivors: 0

Ground casualties
- Ground injuries: 1

Air Midwest Flight 5481 was a Beechcraft 1900D which crashed upon takeoff while on a regularly scheduled passenger flight from Charlotte Douglas International Airport in Charlotte, North Carolina, to Greenville–Spartanburg International Airport in Greer, South Carolina. On the morning of January 8, 2003, the Beechcraft stalled while departing the airport and crashed into an aircraft hangar, killing all 21 passengers and crew aboard and injuring one person on the ground.

== Accident ==
=== Flight information ===
Air Midwest Flight 5481 (operating as a US Airways Express flight under a franchise agreement with US Airways) was a regularly scheduled passenger flight from Charlotte Douglas International Airport near Charlotte, North Carolina, to Greenville–Spartanburg International Airport in Greer, South Carolina. On January 8, 2003, Flight 5481 was operated by a Beechcraft 1900D (registration number N233YV). The aircraft was originally delivered to Air Midwest, then leased to Ministic Airlines, then returned to Air Midwest. It had accumulated 15,003 flight hours at the time of the crash. It had been in one previous accident in 1997 with Ministic.

Final tally of passenger nationalities
Nationality	Passengers	Crew	Total
Bahamas	3	0	3
India	2	0	2
Canada	1	0	1
Portugal	1	0	1
United States	12	2	14
Total	19	2	21

Two crew members and 19 passengers were aboard the Beechcraft. Both crew members and 12 passengers were American; the rest were from different nationalities. The crew consisted of Captain Catherine "Katie" Leslie (age 25) and First Officer Jonathan Gibbs (age 27). Leslie was the youngest captain flying for the airline at that time, and had accrued 1,865 hours total company flying time, including 1,100 hours as the pilot-in-command of a Beechcraft 1900D. Gibbs had 706 hours of flying time in Beechcraft 1900D aircraft. Both pilots were based in Charlotte.

=== Departure and crash ===
On the morning of January 8, 2003, ramp agents loaded 23 checked bags onto Flight 5481, including two unusually heavy bags. The flight crew completed their preflight checklists, including center of gravity (CG) checks.

Flight 5481 left the gate about 08:30 Eastern Standard Time. (Note: All times in the NTSB's final report are given in Eastern Standard Time (UTC−05:00).) At 08:37, ground controllers cleared Flight 5481 to taxi to runway 18R for departure. At 08:46, the tower controller cleared Flight 5481 for takeoff, and the pilots applied takeoff power and began their takeoff roll.

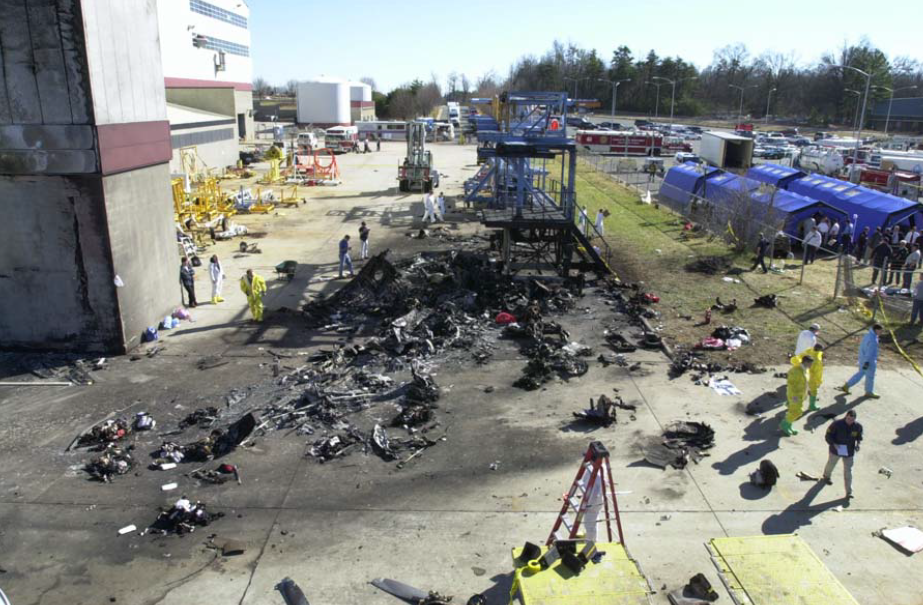
Side view of the main wreckage of the aircraft

Immediately after becoming airborne, Flight 5481's nose began to rapidly pitch up. By the time it reached an altitude of 90 feet (27 m) above ground level, the plane's nose had pitched up 20°. Despite both pilots trying forcefully to push the nose down, the plane continued to pitch nose-up, reaching a maximum of 54° of pitch. The aircraft's stall-warning horn sounded, and the pilots declared an emergency to air traffic controllers. After climbing to an altitude of 1,150 feet (350 m), the plane stalled, abruptly pitching down into an uncontrollable descent. About 35 seconds after taking off, Flight 5481 crashed into an aircraft maintenance hangar and burst into flames. All 19 passengers and both crew members were killed. A US Airways mechanic on the ground was treated for smoke inhalation. No one else on the ground was injured.

== Cause of the crash ==
The investigators determined the crash to have been the result of the combination of two separate issues. After take-off, the plane climbed steeply as a result of higher than calculated weight on the aircraft that generated an incorrect center of gravity readout. Though both pilots pushed forward on the control column, the plane did not respond to their input, which led to the stalling of the aircraft.

The aircraft's most recent service involved adjusting the elevator control cable, and was performed two nights before the crash by Vertex Aerospace at a repair facility located at Tri-State Airport in Huntington, West Virginia. The investigation indicated the mechanic who worked on the elevator cables had never worked on this type of aircraft before, and turnbuckles controlling tension on the cables to the elevators had been set incorrectly, resulting in insufficient elevator travel, leading to the pilots not having sufficient pitch control. Although normally a postadjustment control test would be conducted to ensure that the maintenance had been carried out correctly, and that the surface was operating properly, the maintenance supervisor who was instructing the mechanic decided to skip this step. The instructing maintenance supervisor was also the quality assurance inspector on the test, as the primary inspector was unavailable that evening. The National Transportation Safety Board (NTSB) noted that the Federal Aviation Administration (FAA) was aware of "serious deficiencies" in the training procedures at the facility, but had done nothing to correct them.

Although the pilots had totaled up the ostensible take-off weight of the aircraft before the flight and determined it to be within limits, the plane was actually overloaded and out of balance due to the use of FAA-approved (but actually incorrect) passenger weight estimates. When checked, the NTSB found that the actual weight of an average passenger was more than 20 pounds (9 kg) greater than estimated. After checking the actual weight of baggage retrieved from the crash site and passengers (based on information from next-of-kin and the medical examiner), the aircraft was found to be actually 580 lb (264 kg) above its maximum allowable take-off weight, with its center of gravity 5% to the rear of the allowable limit.

Neither problem alone would have caused the loss of control, which explains why it had previously been flown without incident and had safely departed Huntington, West Virginia.

== Aftermath ==
The NTSB report included 21 safety recommendations.

As a result of the weight issues discovered, the FAA planned to investigate and potentially revise estimated weight values, which had not been done since 1936. Air Midwest used an average weight of 200 lb (90.7 kg) per passenger after the accident, but the NTSB suggests that airlines use actual weights instead of average. About 70% of small air carriers still use average. Air Midwest publicly apologized for the incident after the family of one crash victim pressured the airline to do so. Air Midwest ceased operations in 2008. A memorial for the victims is located outside of Charlotte, North Carolina. Effectively, as a result of this incident and a similar accident with a 1900D later that year, US Airways Express retired the 1900D from service.

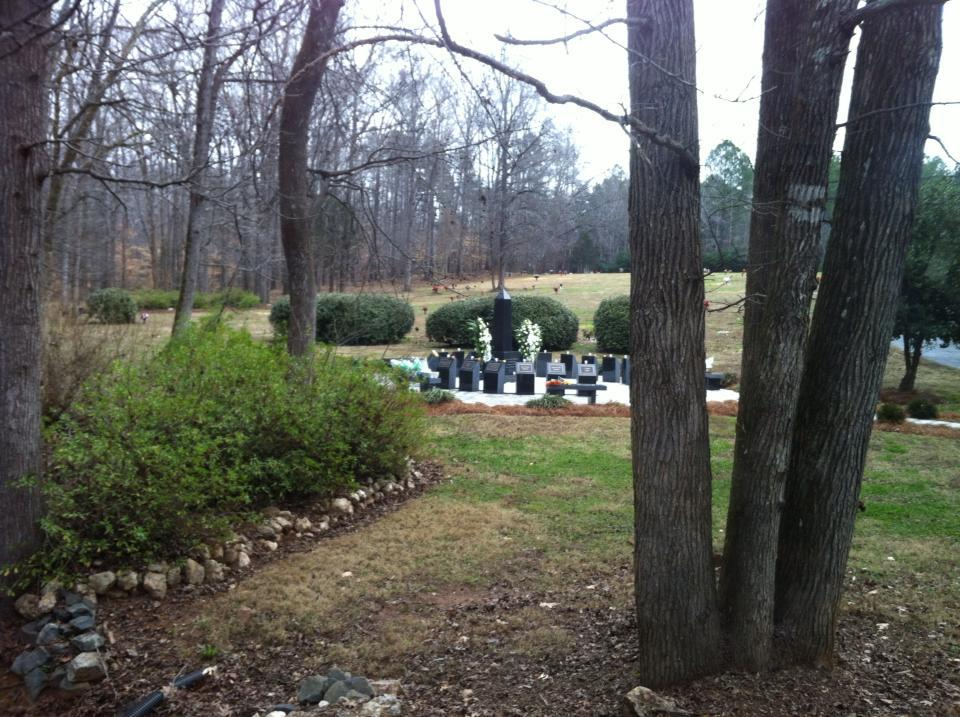
Flight 5481 Memorial in Matthews, North Carolina

== Dramatization ==
The crash was featured in season five of the Canadian-made, internationally distributed documentary series Mayday, in an episode titled "Dead Weight".

== Images ==
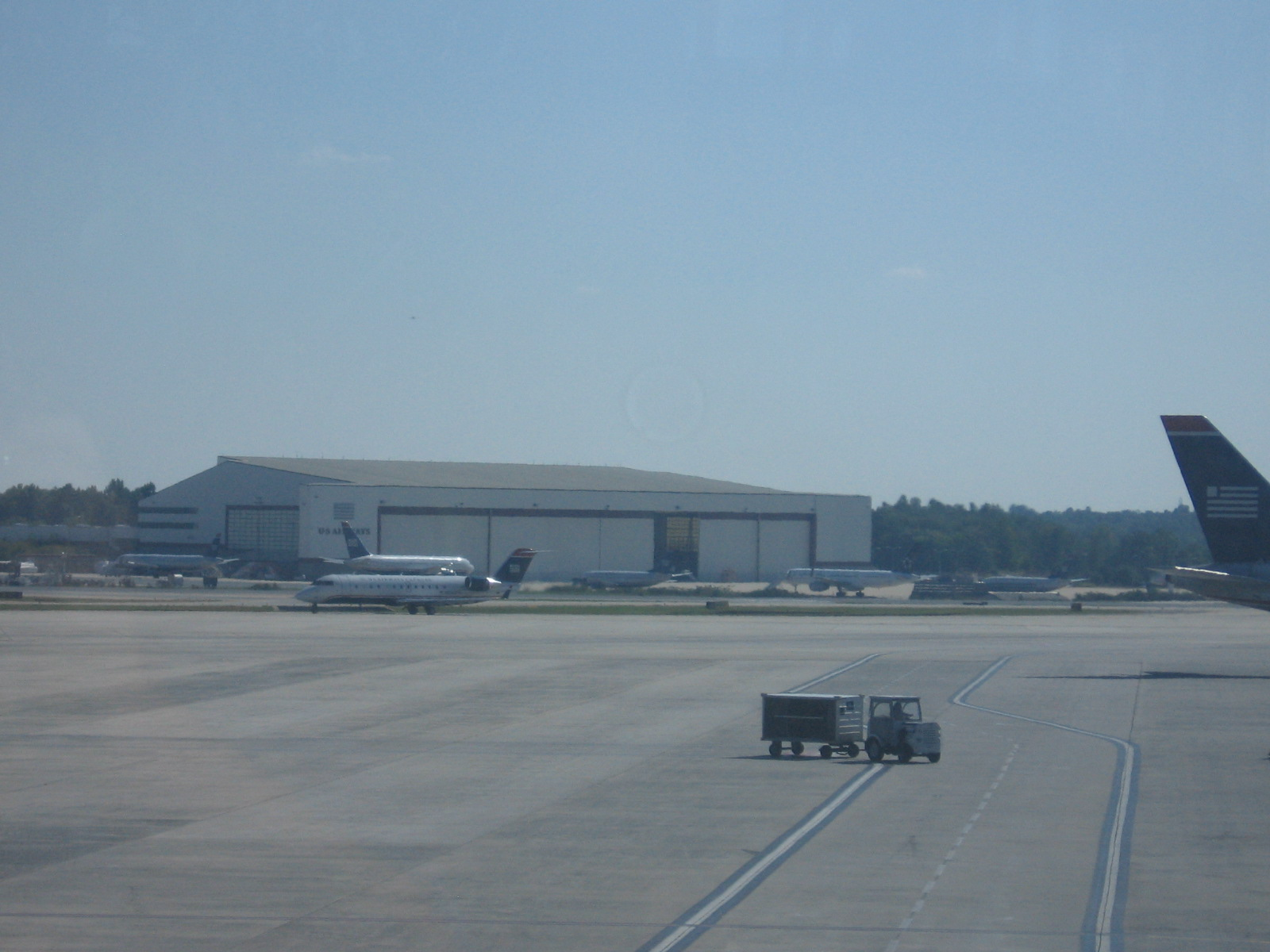
US Airways hangar at Charlotte Douglas International Airport as viewed from Terminal in 2009.

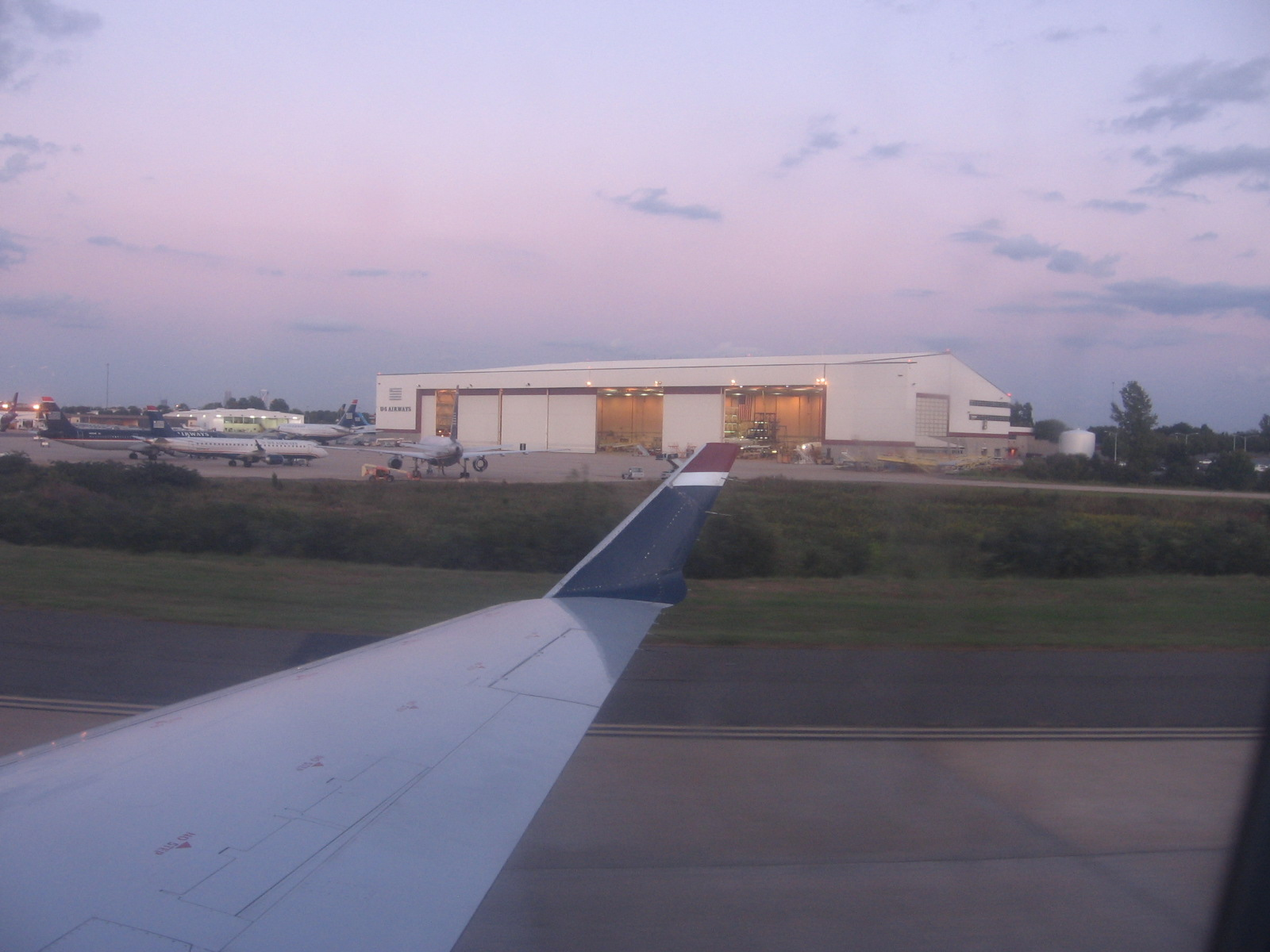
US Airways hangar at Charlotte Douglas International Airport viewed from Runway 18R.

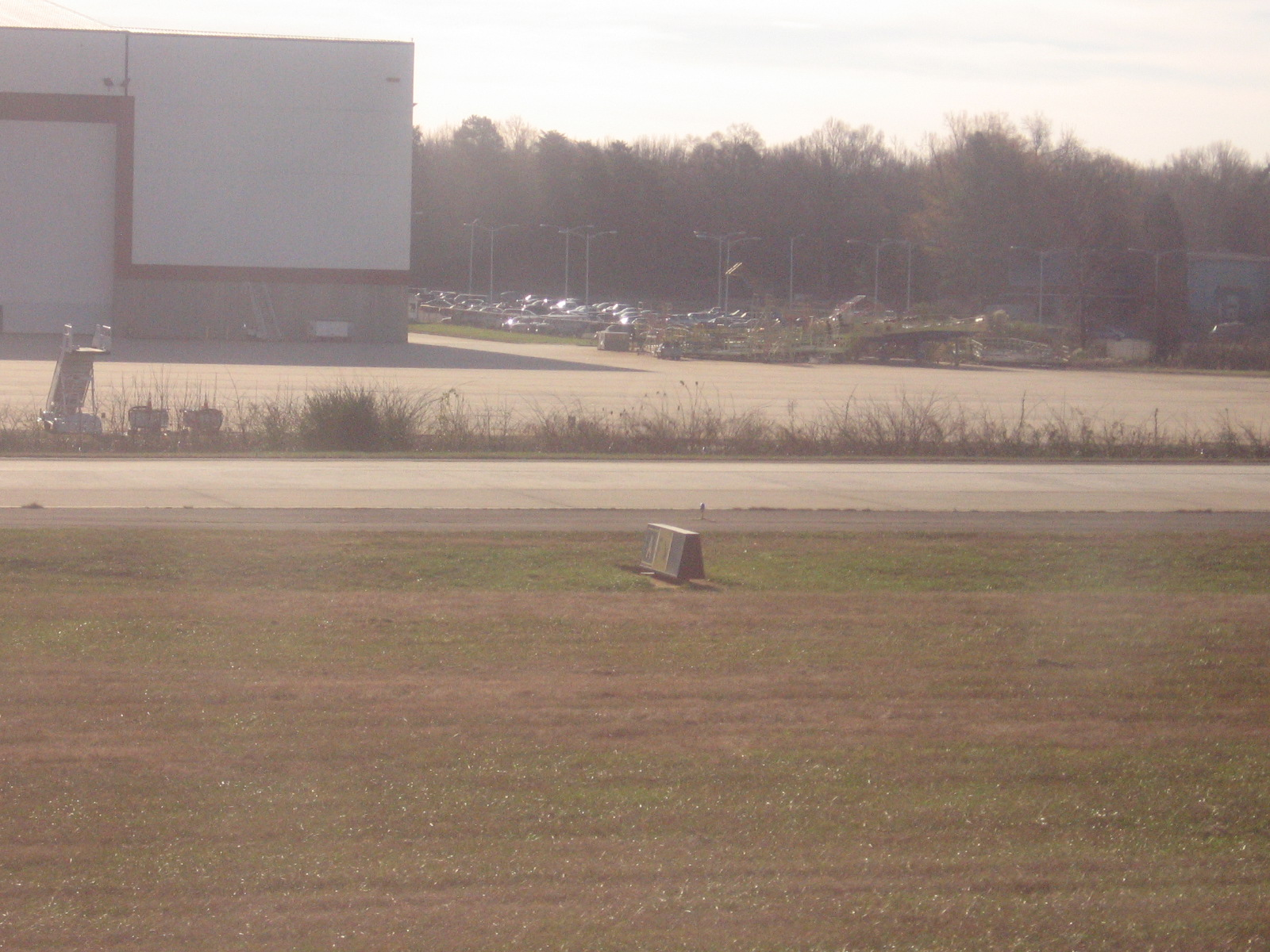
Detail view of crash location at northwest corner of US Airways hangar at Charlotte Douglas International Airport viewed from Runway 5.

== See also ==
- Ryan Air Services Flight 103, a crash of a Beechcraft 1900C in 1987 that was overloaded and a center of gravity too aft from specifications.
- National Airlines Flight 102
- UTA Flight 141
- Colgan Air Flight 9446
- Fine Air Flight 101, a cargo flight where a weight imbalance was a major contributor.
