= Red Devil, Alaska =

- CDP
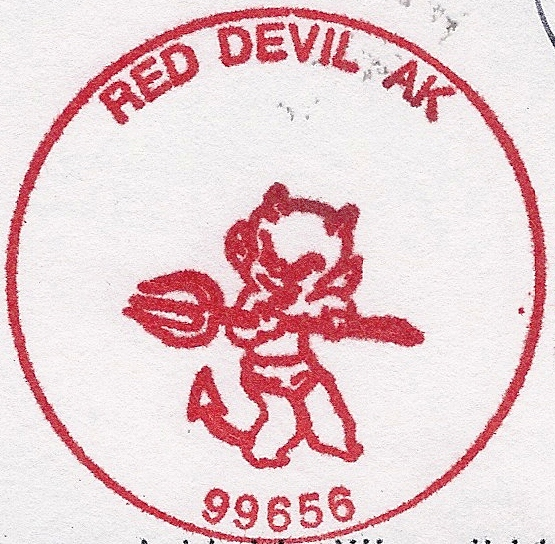

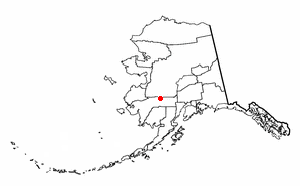
- Location of Red Devil, Alaska
- Coordinates: 61°46′41″N 157°20′54″W
- Country: United States
- State: Alaska
- Census Area: Bethel

Government
  - State senator: Lyman Hoffman (D)
  - State rep.: Bryce Edgmon (I)

Area
  - Total: 27.83 sq mi (72.07 km^{2})
  - Land: 25.13 sq mi (65.08 km^{2})
  - Water: 2.70 sq mi (6.99 km^{2})

Population (2020)
  - Total: 22
  - Density: 0.88/sq mi (0.34/km^{2})
- Time zone: UTC-9 (Alaska (AKST))
  - Summer (DST): UTC-8 (AKDT)
- ZIP code: 99656
- Area code: 907
- FIPS code: 02-64930
- GNIS ID: 2419198

Red Devil is a census-designated place (CDP) in Bethel Census Area, Alaska, United States. As of the 2020 census, Red Devil had a population of 22. Their post office was founded in 1957.

== History ==
The village was named after the Red Devil Mine, established in 1921 by Hans Halverson when numerous mercury (quicksilver) deposits were discovered in the surrounding Kilbuck-Kuskokwim Mountains. By 1933, the mine was producing substantial quantities of mercury. Although the mine changed ownership twice over the years, it continued to operate until 1971.

== Geography ==
According to the United States Census Bureau, the CDP has a total area of 26.4 square miles (68 km^{2}), of which, 24.2 square miles (63 km^{2}) of it is land and 2.2 square miles (5.7 km^{2}) of it (8.34%) is water.

== Demographics ==
Historical population
Census	Pop.	Note	%±
1960	152		—
1970	81		−46.7%
1980	39		−51.9%
1990	53		35.9%
2000	48		−9.4%
2010	23		−52.1%
2020	22		−4.3%
U.S. Decennial Census

Red Devil first appeared on the 1960 U.S. Census as an unincorporated village. In 1980, it was made a census-designated place (CDP).

As of the census of 2010, there were 23 people, 12 occupied households, residing in the CDP. The population density was 1.9 inhabitants per square mile (0.73/km^{2}). There were 22 housing units at an average density of 0.9/sq mi (0.4/km^{2}). The racial makeup of the CDP was 17.4% White, 43.5% Native American, and 39.1% from two or more races. The population was spread out, with 2 people under the age of 14, 2 people 15 to 19 and the remaining 19 people were 25 or older. The median income for a household for 2009 in the CDP was $59,886. 40.4% of the population lives beneath the poverty line.

== Notable people ==
- Roland Welker (1971–), winner of Alone (TV series) Season 7.

== See also ==
- Red Devil Airport
