= Grayling Airport =

- IATA: KGX; ICAO: PAGX; FAA LID: KGX

Summary
- Airport type: Public
- Owner: State of Alaska DOT&PF – Northern Region
- Location: Grayling, Alaska
- Elevation AMSL: 99 ft (30 m)
- Coordinates: 62°53′40″N 160°03′54″W

Map
- Location of airport in Alaska

Runways
Direction	Length		Surface
Direction	ft	m	Surface
15/33	2,315	706	Gravel
- Source: Federal Aviation Administration

Grayling Airport (IATA: KGX, ICAO: PAGX, FAA LID: KGX) is a state-owned public-use airport located one mile (2 km) south of the central business district of Grayling, a city in the Yukon-Koyukuk Census Area of the U.S. state of Alaska.

== Facilities ==
Grayling Airport has one runway (15/33) with a gravel surface measuring 2,315 x 60 ft. (706 x 18 m).

== Airlines and destinations ==
Airlines	Destinations
Ryan Air	Aniak, Shageluk

== See also ==
- List of airports in Alaska
