= Nanwalek, Alaska =

- Census-designated place
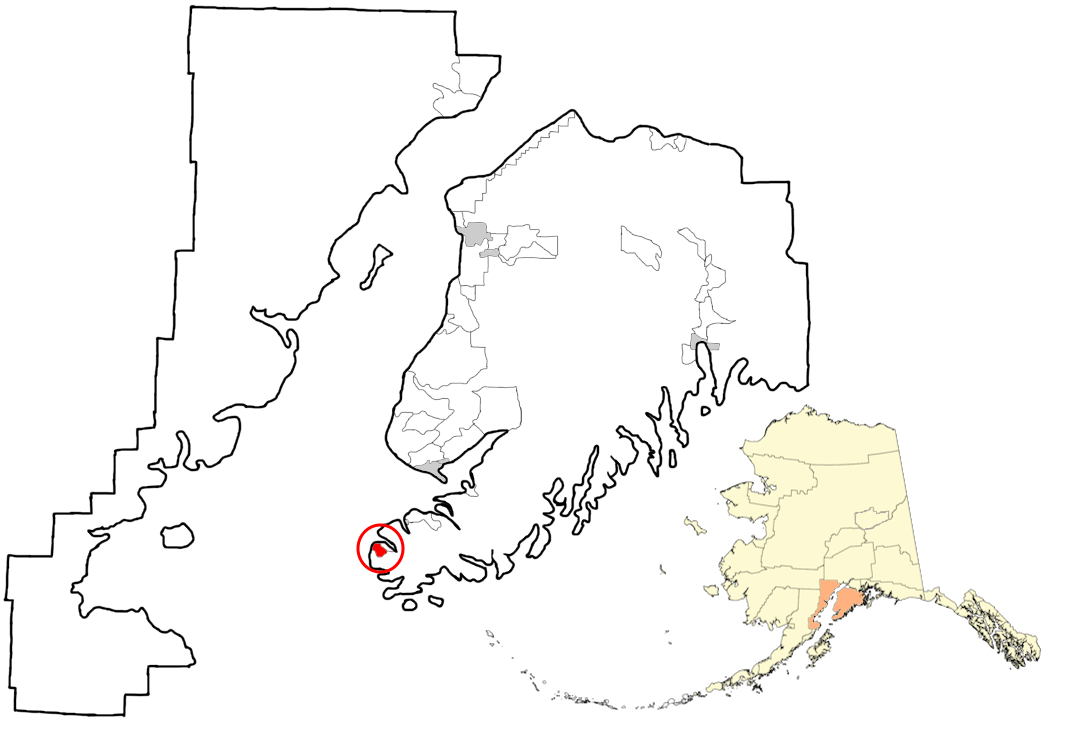
- Location in Kenai Peninsula Borough, Alaska
- Coordinates: 59°21′13″N 151°54′45″W
- Country: United States
- State: Alaska
- Borough: Kenai Peninsula

Government
  - Borough mayor: Peter Micciche
  - State senator: Lyman Hoffman (D)
  - State rep.: Bryce Edgmon (I)

Area
  - Total: 8.40 sq mi (21.75 km^{2})
  - Land: 8.39 sq mi (21.72 km^{2})
  - Water: 0.015 sq mi (0.04 km^{2})
- Elevation: 50 ft (15 m)

Population (2020)
  - Total: 247
  - Density: 29.4/sq mi (11.37/km^{2})
- Time zone: UTC-9 (Alaska (AKST))
  - Summer (DST): UTC-8 (AKDT)
- ZIP code: 99603
- Area code: 907
- FIPS code: 02-52210

Nanwalek (‘place by lagoon’; Russian: Нануалек), formerly Alexandrovsk (Russian: Александровск) and later English Bay, is a census-designated place (CDP) in the Kenai Peninsula Borough, Alaska, United States, that contains a traditional Alutiiq village. The population was 247 at the 2020 United States census, down from 254 in 2010. There is one school located in the community, attended by 81 students.

Subsistence activities are a large part of the culture for indigenous people, and Nanwalek is no exception, especially when it comes to salmon and seal harvesting. The sale of alcohol is banned in the village, although importing and possession are allowed.

== Geography ==
Nanwalek and Port Graham are located near the southern tip of the Kenai Peninsula and are separated by less than 5 miles (8 km). Both villages are accessible only by air or water (they lie 23 miles (37 km) southwest of Homer). The Alaska Marine Highway System provides service to nearby Seldovia (located only 10 miles (16 km) up the coast line). A state-owned 1,850-by-50-foot (564 by 15 m) gravel airstrip sits atop a natural spit which divides the small lagoon from the southern mouth of Cook Inlet. Looking northwest across Cook Inlet, one can see Mount Iliamna 60 miles (97 km) away and further to the north Mount Redoubt, 80 miles (130 km) away. Although they are in the vicinity of the village, they do not cause trouble to the villagers, since Iliamna is erupting continuously, emitting only smoke, and Redoubt is so far in the north that the ashes from its eruptions bother mostly Kenai and Anchorage. It is Augustine (the most active volcano of the eastern Aleutian arc), 50 miles (80 km) due west across Cook Inlet, which makes life nasty in Nanwalek, Port Graham, Seldovia and Homer when it erupts, as it most recently has done in 1986 and 2006.

According to the United States Census Bureau, the CDP has a total area of 8.4 square miles (21.8 km^{2}), of which 0.02 square miles (0.04 km^{2}), or 0.16%, are water.

== Early history ==
A Russian fortress called Aleksandrovsk, the first Russian post on mainland Alaska, was established at the present site of Nanwalek by men of Grigorii Shelikhov’s company in 1786, while Shelikhov himself was still on Kodiak Island.

In 1793, men from the company of the rivalling Pavel Lebedev-Lastochkin, who had in the meantime established themselves around the modern city of Kenai, attacked with 60 men the Aleksandrovsk fortress, accompanied by Dena'ina warriors. Lebedev-Lastochkin’s men organized various provocations and beat the local Natives, took from them furs that would have been sent to Shelikhov’s men in Kodiak, but ultimately they could not capture the fort.

In the summer of 1794, the fortress was moved to a new, higher place, since the old structures had rotted and had begun to collapse as a result of high tides. At this time, the head of the fortress was V. I. Malakhov. This seems to indicate that the first fortress had been located on the Nanwalek spit.

In 1798, when the Dena'ina Indians rose against the men of Lebedev-Lastochkin’s company in Kenai, Tyonek and Old Iliamna, the timely arrival of a detachment from Aleksandrovsk, led by V. I. Malakhov, saved the Kenai colony from total destruction. The Tyonek and Iliamna colonies, however, were destroyed.

By 1818, the fortress in Nanwalek was closed down, and possibly the colony since then existed as an odinochka, or ‘one man post’, although this is not certain. The fortress was transferred at this time to Nushagak, where it was known as the Novo-Aleksandrovskii fortress (‘New Aleksandrovskii fortress’).

== Demographics ==
Many of the current residents are of mixed Russian and Sugpiaq (Alutiiq) heritage. Villagers speak Sugt'stun, an Eskimo language closely related to Yup'ik.

Historical population
Census	Pop.	Note	%±
1880	88		—
1890	107		21.6%
1930	107		—
1940	48		−55.1%
1950	75		56.3%
1960	78		4.0%
1970	58		−25.6%
1980	124		113.8%
1990	158		27.4%
2000	177		12.0%
2010	254		43.5%
2020	247		−2.8%
U.S. Decennial Census

Nanwalek first appeared on the 1880 U.S. Census as the unincorporated village of Alexandrovsk. It had 75 Sugpiaq residents, 12 Creole (Mixed Russian & Sugpiaq) and 1 White. It reported as English Bay in 1890, with 107 residents (100 Sugpiaq, 6 Creole, 1 White). It did not report again until 1930, when it returned 107 residents, the same as 40 years earlier. It continued to report in every successive census. In 1980, English Bay was made a census-designated place (CDP). In 1991, the name was officially changed to the present Nanwalek.

As of the census of 2000, there were 177 people, 45 households, and 32 families residing in the CDP. The population density was 20.8 inhabitants per square mile (8.0/km^{2}). There were 54 housing units at an average density of 6.3 per square mile (2.4/km^{2}). The racial makeup of the CDP was 89.27% Native American, 6.78% White and 3.95% from two or more races. 1.13% of the population were Hispanic or Latino of any race.

There were 45 households, out of which 55.6% had children under the age of 18 living with them, 51.1% were married couples living together, 15.6% had a female householder with no husband present, and 26.7% were non-families. 22.2% of all households were made up of individuals, and 2.2% had someone living alone who was 65 years of age or older. The average household size was 3.93 and the average family size was 4.79.

In the CDP, the population was spread out, with 42.9% under the age of 18, 14.1% from 18 to 24, 31.6% from 25 to 44, 10.7% from 45 to 64, and 0.6% who were 65 years of age or older. The median age was 22 years. For every 100 females, there were 113.3 males. For every 100 females age 18 and over, there were 114.9 males.

The median income for a household in the CDP was $42,500, and the median income for a family was $45,750. Males had a median income of $33,750 versus $32,813 for females. The per capita income for the CDP was $10,577. About 14.7% of families and 17.5% of the population were below the poverty line, including 12.6% of those under the age of 18 and none of those 65 or over.

== Religion ==
A Russian Orthodox church consecrated to Saints Sergius and Herman of Valaam was built in the community in 1870 (only three years after the sale of Alaska by Russia to the United States). A replacement church building was constructed in 1930 and is listed on the National Register of Historic Places.

The Orthodox Church in Alaska can trace its activities back to early Russian missionaries. The witness of Herman of Alaska, Saint Innocent of Alaska, and Peter the Aleut has contributed to the continuing strong Orthodox community in villages like Nanwalek.

== Transportation ==
Nanwalek has a public-use airport, the Nanwalek Airport.

== Sources ==
- Grinëv, Andrei Val’terovich: Russian Colonization of Alaska: Preconditions, Discovery, and Initial Development. University of Nebraska Press, Lincoln & London.
