= Shageluk, Alaska =

Shageluk Łeggi Jitno’ / Edixi (Degexit'an)
- City
- Location in Alaska
- Coordinates: 62°39′22″N 159°31′52″W
- Country: United States
- State: Alaska
- Census Area: Yukon-Koyukuk
- Incorporated: July 9, 1970

Government
  - Mayor: Chevie Roach
  - State senator: Click Bishop (R)
  - State rep.: Mike Cronk (R)

Area
  - Total: 11.50 sq mi (29.78 km^{2})
  - Land: 10.22 sq mi (26.46 km^{2})
  - Water: 1.28 sq mi (3.32 km^{2})
- Elevation: 62 ft (19 m)

Population (2020)
  - Total: 100
  - Density: 9.8/sq mi (3.78/km^{2})
- Time zone: UTC-9 (Alaska (AKST))
  - Summer (DST): UTC-8 (AKDT)
- ZIP code: 99665
- Area code: 907
- FIPS code: 02-68670
- GNIS feature ID: 1409306

Shageluk (Deg Xinag: Łeggi Jitno’) is a city in Yukon-Koyukuk Census Area, Alaska, United States. As of the 2020 census, Shageluk had a population of 100.

== Geography ==
Shageluk is located at 62°39′22″N 159°31′52″W (62.655998, -159.531132).

According to the United States Census Bureau, the city has a total area of 12.0 square miles (31 km^{2}), of which, 10.6 square miles (27 km^{2}) of it is land and 1.4 square miles (3.6 km^{2}) of it (11.53%) is water.

== Demographics ==
Historical population
Census	Pop.	Note	%±
1880	150		—
1920	130		—
1930	88		−32.3%
1940	92		4.5%
1950	100		8.7%
1960	155		55.0%
1970	167		7.7%
1980	131		−21.6%
1990	139		6.1%
2000	129		−7.2%
2010	83		−35.7%
2020	100		20.5%
U.S. Decennial Census

Shageluk first appeared on the 1880 U.S. Census as the center of an unincorporated area called "Chageluk Settlements." It reported 150 residents, all of the Tinneh tribe. It would not report again on the census until 1920, when Shageluk appeared separately as an unincorporated village. In 1966, the village relocated 2 miles south to higher ground because of flooding and rebuilt. It formally incorporated in 1970. The old townsite is within the present city boundaries.

=== 2020 census ===
As of the 2020 census, Shageluk had a population of 100. The median age was 33.0 years. 35.0% of residents were under the age of 18 and 13.0% of residents were 65 years of age or older. For every 100 females there were 117.4 males, and for every 100 females age 18 and over there were 132.1 males age 18 and over.

0.0% of residents lived in urban areas, while 100.0% lived in rural areas.

There were 34 households in Shageluk, of which 44.1% had children under the age of 18 living in them. Of all households, 29.4% were married-couple households, 41.2% were households with a male householder and no spouse or partner present, and 11.8% were households with a female householder and no spouse or partner present. About 26.5% of all households were made up of individuals and 8.8% had someone living alone who was 65 years of age or older.

There were 42 housing units, of which 19.0% were vacant. The homeowner vacancy rate was 7.1% and the rental vacancy rate was 20.0%.

Racial composition as of the 2020 census
Race	Number	Percent
White	4	4.0%
Black or African American	0	0.0%
American Indian and Alaska Native	91	91.0%
Asian	0	0.0%
Native Hawaiian and Other Pacific Islander	0	0.0%
Some other race	2	2.0%
Two or more races	3	3.0%
Hispanic or Latino (of any race)	3	3.0%

=== 2000 census ===
As of the census of 2000, there were 129 people, 36 households, and 29 families residing in the city. The population density was 12.2 inhabitants per square mile (4.7/km^{2}). There were 52 housing units at an average density of 4.9 per square mile (1.9/km^{2}). The racial makeup of the city was 3.10% White and 96.90% Native American.

There were 36 households, out of which 44.4% had children under the age of 18 living with them, 33.3% were married couples living together, 33.3% had a female householder with no husband present, and 16.7% were non-families. 16.7% of all households were made up of individuals, and none had someone living alone who was 65 years of age or older. The average household size was 3.58 and the average family size was 3.83.

In the city, the age distribution of the population shows 42.6% under the age of 18, 7.0% from 18 to 24, 25.6% from 25 to 44, 14.7% from 45 to 64, and 10.1% who were 65 years of age or older. The median age was 26 years. For every 100 females, there were 108.1 males. For every 100 females age 18 and over, there were 124.2 males.

The median income for a household in the city was $26,667, and the median income for a family was $24,000. Males had a median income of $11,250 versus $22,083 for females. The per capita income for the city was $7,587.

== Transportation ==
It is served by the Shageluk Airport.

== Education ==
The Iditarod Area School District operates the Innoko River School in Shageluk.
