= Port Graham Airport =

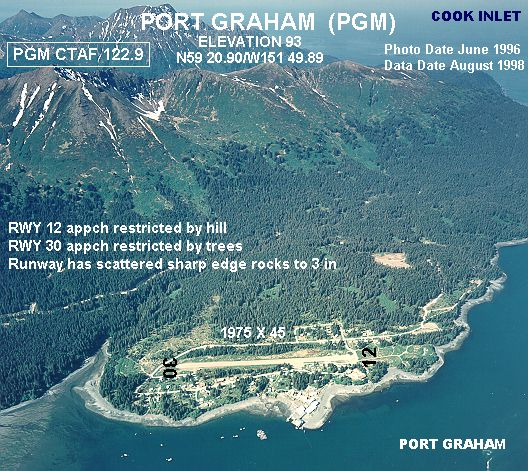
- IATA: PGM; ICAO: none; FAA LID: PGM

Summary
- Airport type: Public
- Owner: Alaska DOT&PF - Central Region
- Serves: Port Graham, Alaska
- Elevation AMSL: 93 ft / 28 m
- Coordinates: 59°20′54″N 151°49′54″W

Map
- Location of airport in Alaska

Runways
Direction	Length		Surface
Direction	ft	m	Surface
12/30	1,975	602	Gravel/dirt

Statistics
- Enplanements (2008): 2,916
- Aircraft operations (2005): 950
- Source: Federal Aviation Administration

Port Graham Airport (IATA: PGM, FAA LID: PGM) is a state-owned public-use airport located in Port Graham, in the Kenai Peninsula Borough of the U.S. state of Alaska.

This airport is included in the FAA's National Plan of Integrated Airport Systems for 2009–2013, where it is listed as commercial service - non-primary, an FAA category for airports with 2,500 to 10,000 passenger boardings (enplanements) per year. As per Federal Aviation Administration records, the airport had 2,916 enplanements in calendar year 2008, a decrease of 1.3% from the 2,953 enplanements in 2007.

== Facilities and aircraft ==
Port Graham Airport covers an area of 31 acres (13 ha) at an elevation of 93 feet (28 m) above mean sea level. It has one runway designated 12/30 with a gravel and dirt surface measuring 1,975 by 45 feet (602 x 14 m). For the 12-month period ending December 31, 2005, the airport had 950 aircraft operations, an average of 79 per month: 79% air taxi and 21% general aviation.

== See also ==
- List of airports in Alaska
