= Sleetmute Airport =

- IATA: SLQ; ICAO: PASL; FAA LID: SLQ

Summary
- Airport type: Public
- Owner: Alaska DOT&PF - Central Region
- Serves: Sleetmute, Alaska
- Elevation AMSL: 190 ft / 58 m
- Coordinates: 61°42′02″N 157°09′57″W

Map
- Location of airport in Alaska

Runways
| Direction | Length | | Surface |
| Direction | ft | m | Surface |
|---|---|---|---|
| 14/32 | 3,100 | 945 | Gravel |
- Source: Federal Aviation Administration

Sleetmute Airport (IATA: SLQ, ICAO: PASL, FAA LID: SLQ) is a state-owned public-use airport serving Sleetmute, in the Bethel Census Area of the U.S. state of Alaska.

== Facilities ==
Sleetmute Airport covers an area of 145 acres (59 ha) at an elevation of 190 feet (58 m) above mean sea level. It has one runway, designated 14/32 with a gravel surface measuring 3,100 by 60 feet (945 x 18 m).

== Airlines and destinations ==
| Airlines | Destinations |
|---|---|
| Ryan Air | Aniak, Stony River |

== See also ==
- List of airports in Alaska
