= Stony River Airport =

Airport in Alaska, United States of America

Stony River Airport Stony River 2 Airport
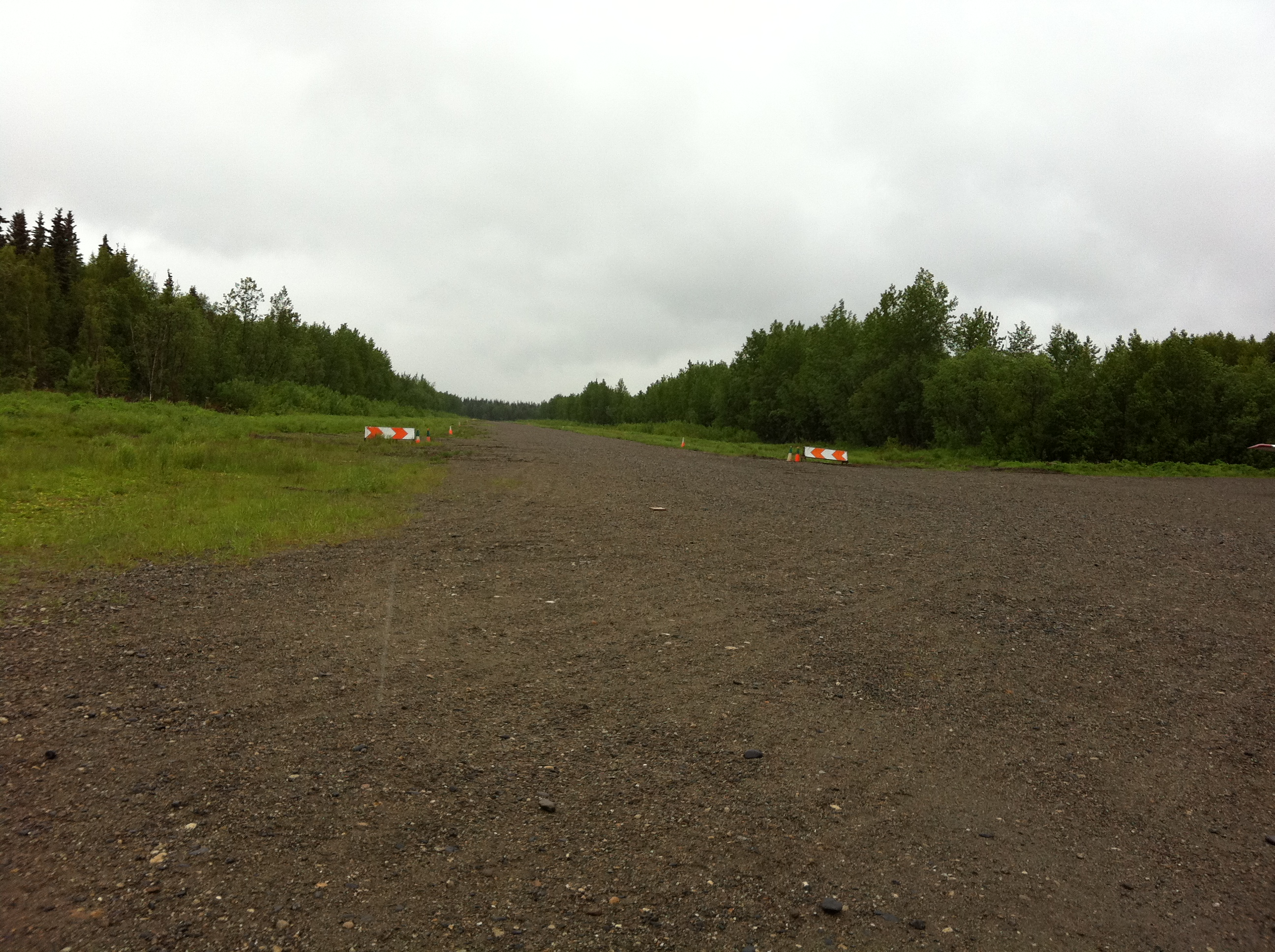
- IATA: SRV; ICAO: none; FAA LID: SRV

Summary
- Airport type: Public
- Owner: State of Alaska DOT&PF
- Serves: Stony River, Alaska
- Elevation AMSL: 230 ft / 70 m
- Coordinates: 61°47′23″N 156°35′19″W

Map
- Location of airport in Alaska

Runways
Direction	Length		Surface
Direction	ft	m	Surface
18/36	2,601	793	Gravel/dirt
- Source: Federal Aviation Administration

Stony River Airport (IATA: SRV, FAA LID: SRV), also known as Stony River 2 Airport, is a state-owned public-use airport located in Stony River, in the Bethel Census Area of the U.S. state of Alaska.

As per Federal Aviation Administration records, this airport had 217 commercial passenger boardings (enplanements) in calendar year 2010, an increase of 51% from the 144 enplanements in 2009. It is included in the FAA's National Plan of Integrated Airport Systems for 2011–2015, which categorized it as a general aviation facility.

== Facilities ==
Stony River Airport covers an area of 8 acres (3 ha) at an elevation of 230 feet (70 m) above mean sea level. It has one runway designated 18/36 with a gravel and dirt surface measuring 2,601 by 33 feet (793 x 10 m).

== Airlines and destinations ==
Airlines	Destinations
Ryan Air	Aniak

== See also ==
- List of airports in Alaska
