= Shageluk Airport =

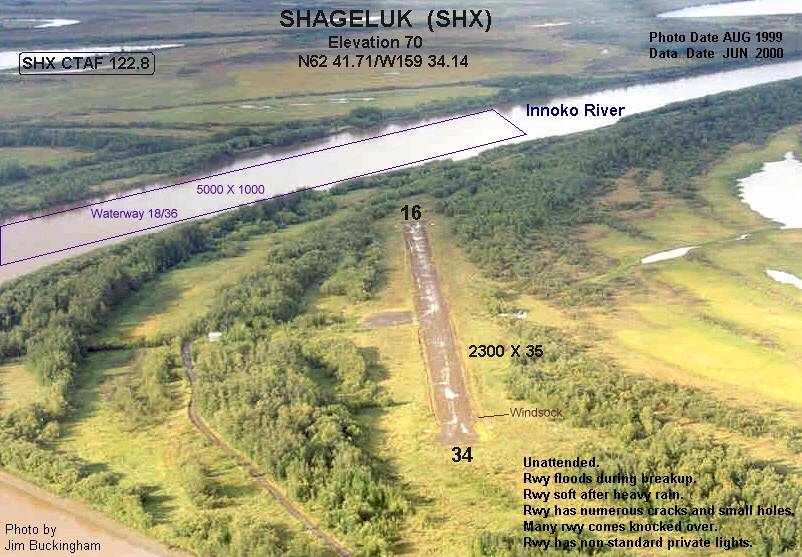
- IATA: SHX; ICAO: PAHX; FAA LID: SHX

Summary
- Airport type: Public
- Owner: Alaska DOT&PF - Northern Region
- Serves: Shageluk, Alaska
- Elevation AMSL: 79 ft / 24 m
- Coordinates: 62°41′32″N 159°34′09″W

Map
- Location of airport in Alaska

Runways
| Direction | Length | | Surface |
| Direction | ft | m | Surface |
|---|---|---|---|
| 16/34 | 3,400 | 1,036 | Gravel |
| 18W/36W | 5,000 | 1,524 | Water |
- Source: Federal Aviation Administration

Shageluk Airport (IATA: SHX, ICAO: PAHX, FAA LID: SHX) is a state-owned public-use airport located one nautical mile (1.85 km) north of the central business district of Shageluk, a city in the Yukon-Koyukuk Census Area of the U.S. state of Alaska.

== Facilities ==
Shageluk Airport covers an area of 148 acres (60 ha) at an elevation of 79 feet (24 m) above mean sea level. It has one runway designated 16/34 with a gravel surface measuring 3,400 by 50 feet (1,036 x 15 m) (expanded from the prior size of 2,200 by 35 feet). It also has a seaplane landing area on the Innoko River designated 18W/36W which measures 5,000 by 1,000 feet.Merrill Field

== Airlines and destinations ==
| Airlines | Destinations |
|---|---|
| Alaska Air Transit | Anchorage Merrill Field |

== See also ==
- List of airports in Alaska
