= Ryan Air Services =

Cargo and passenger airline operating in Bush Alaska

Ryan Air, Inc.

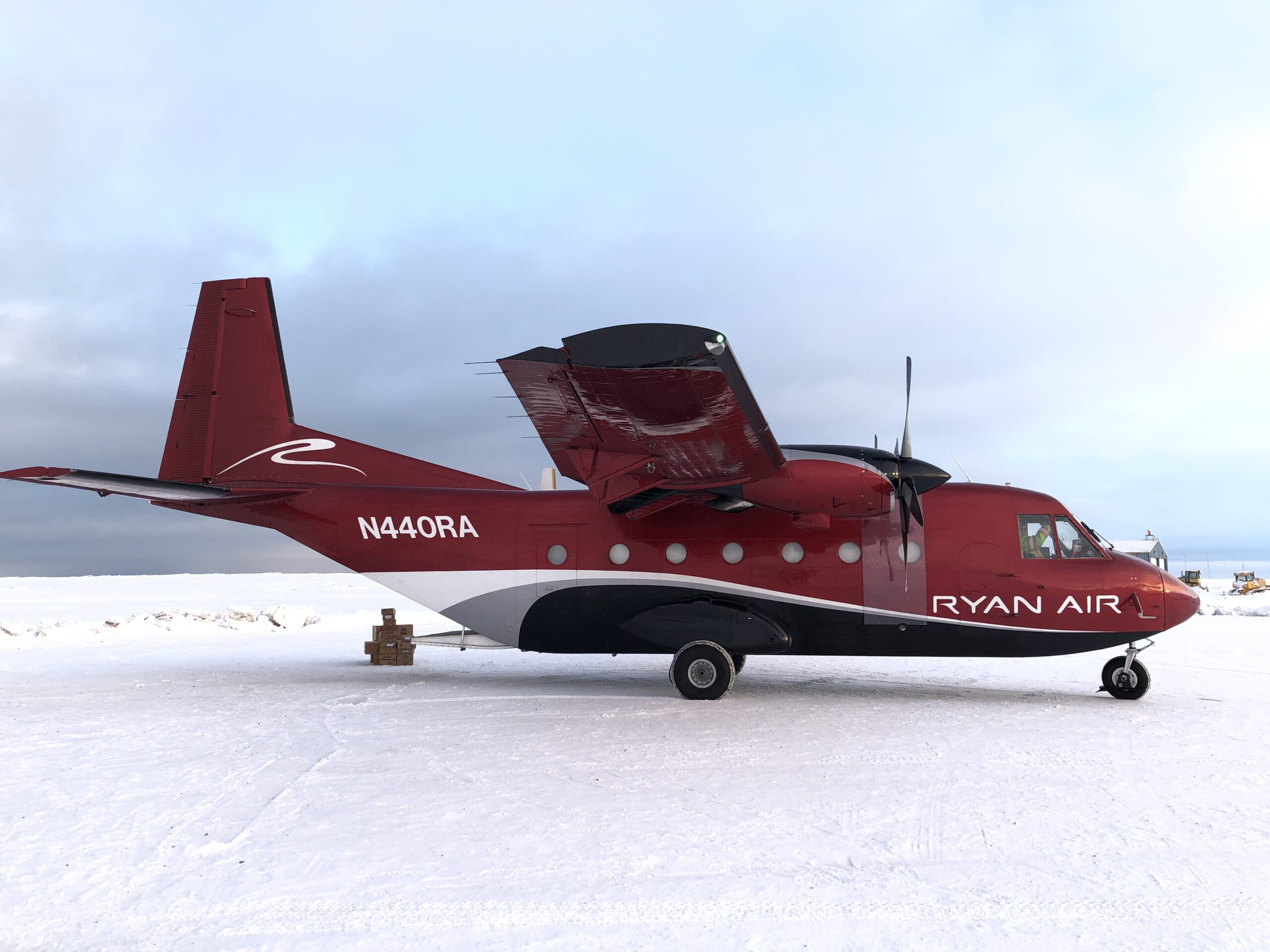
- A Ryan Air Services' CASA C-212.
IATA	ICAO	Call sign
7S*	RYA	RYAN AIR
- Founded: 1953; 73 years ago
- AOC #: UATA650A
- Hubs: Aniak Airport; Bethel Airport; Emmonak Airport; Kotzebue Airport; Nome Airport; St. Mary's Airport; Unalakleet Airport
- Fleet size: 25
- Destinations: Bush Alaska
- Headquarters: Anchorage, Alaska, United States
- Key people: Lee Ryan, President, Wilfred P. Ryan Jr.
- Employees: 170
- Website: http://www.ryanalaska.com/

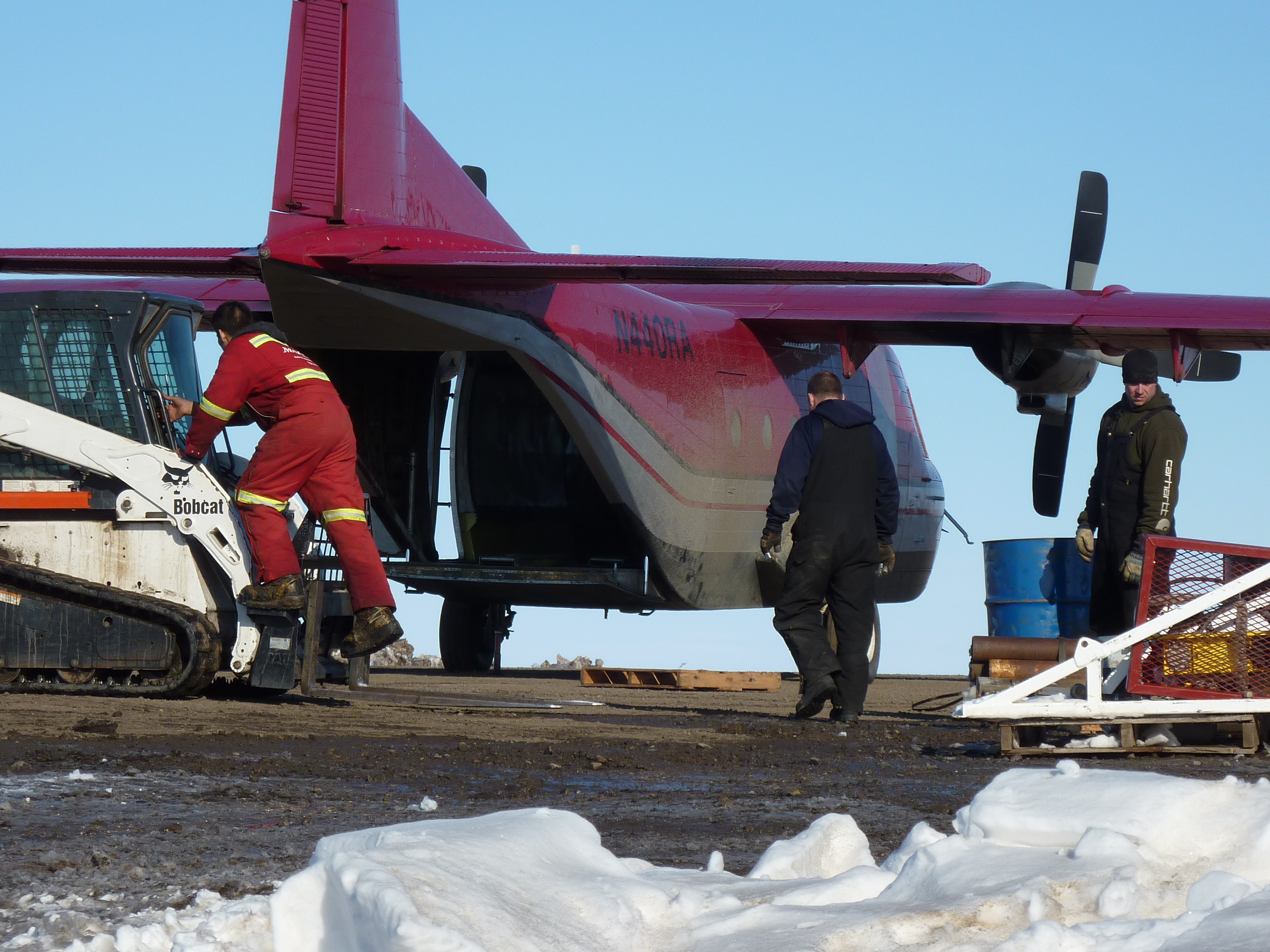
CASA 212

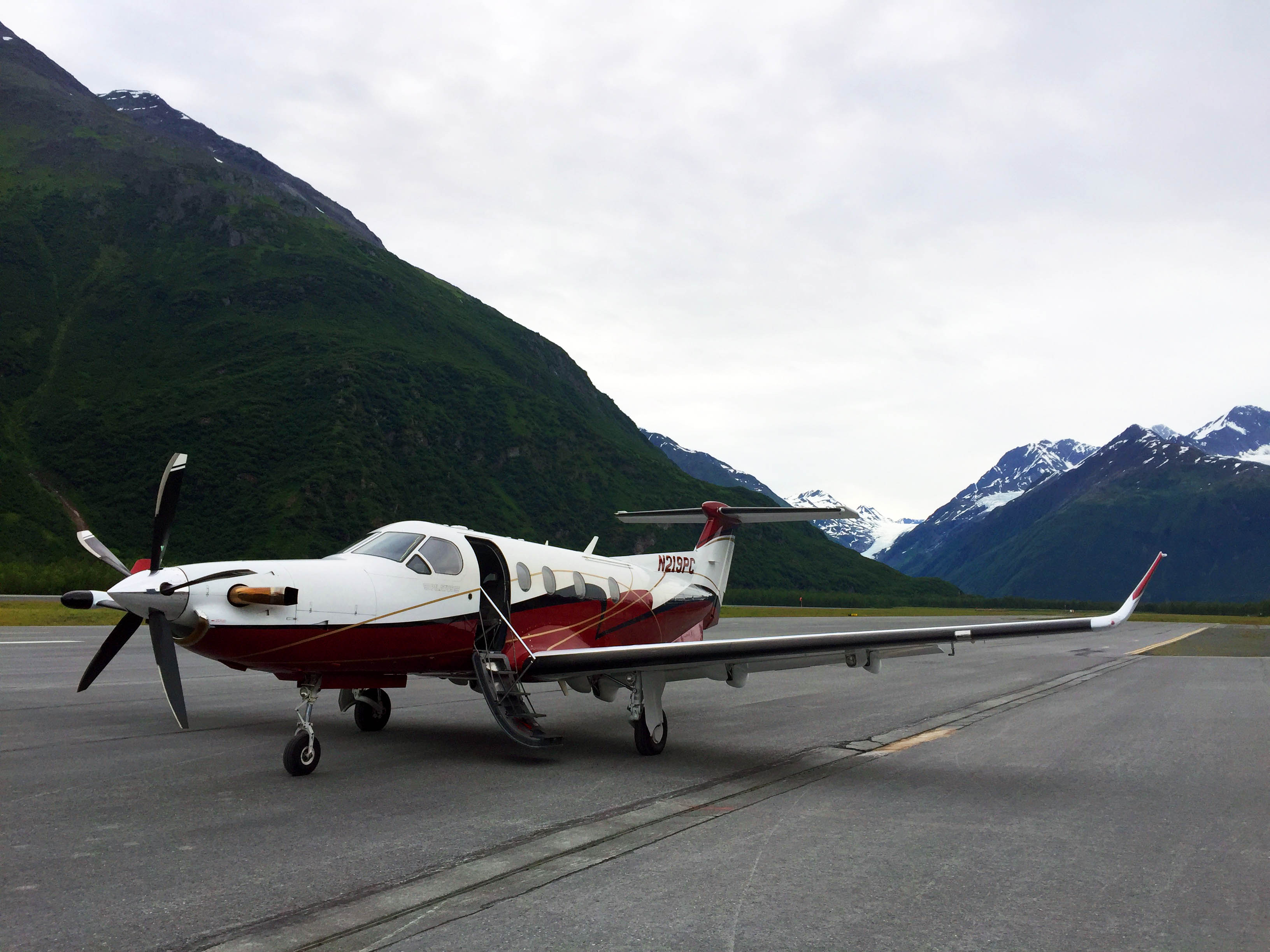
Ryan Air's Pilatus PC-12 for passenger aircraft charter

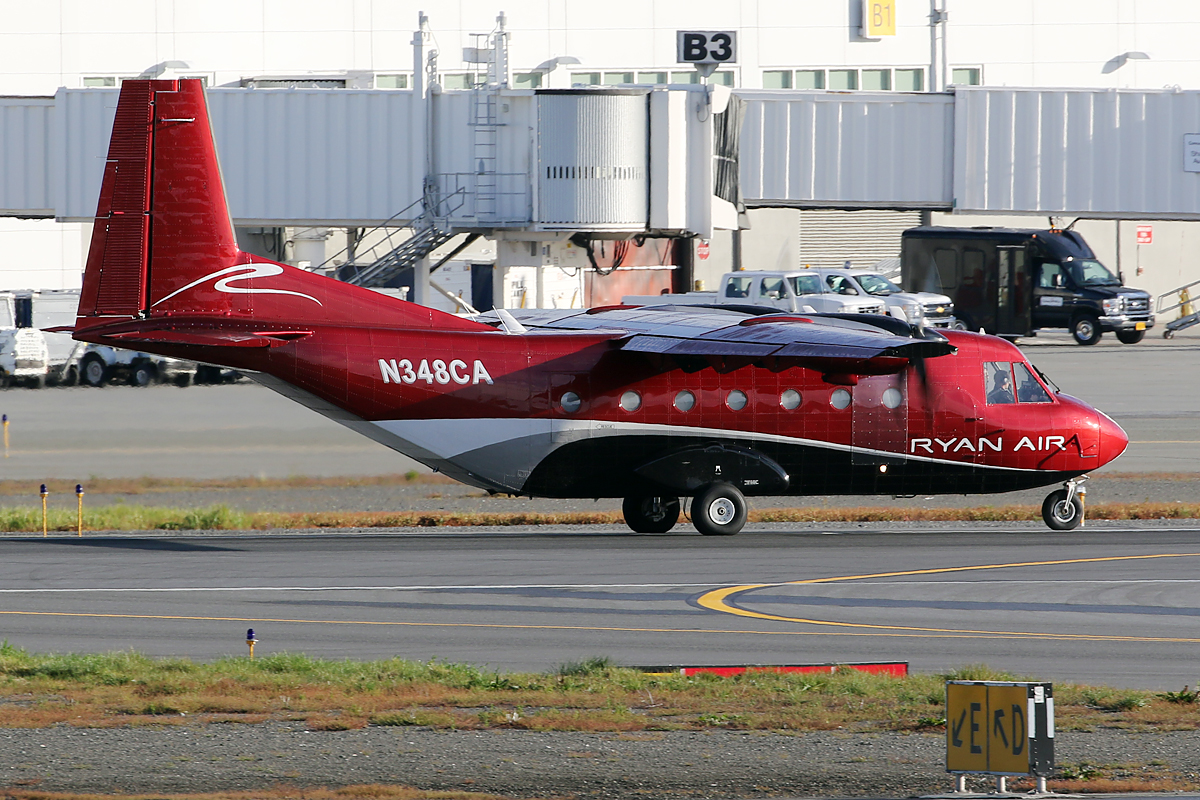
CASA 212

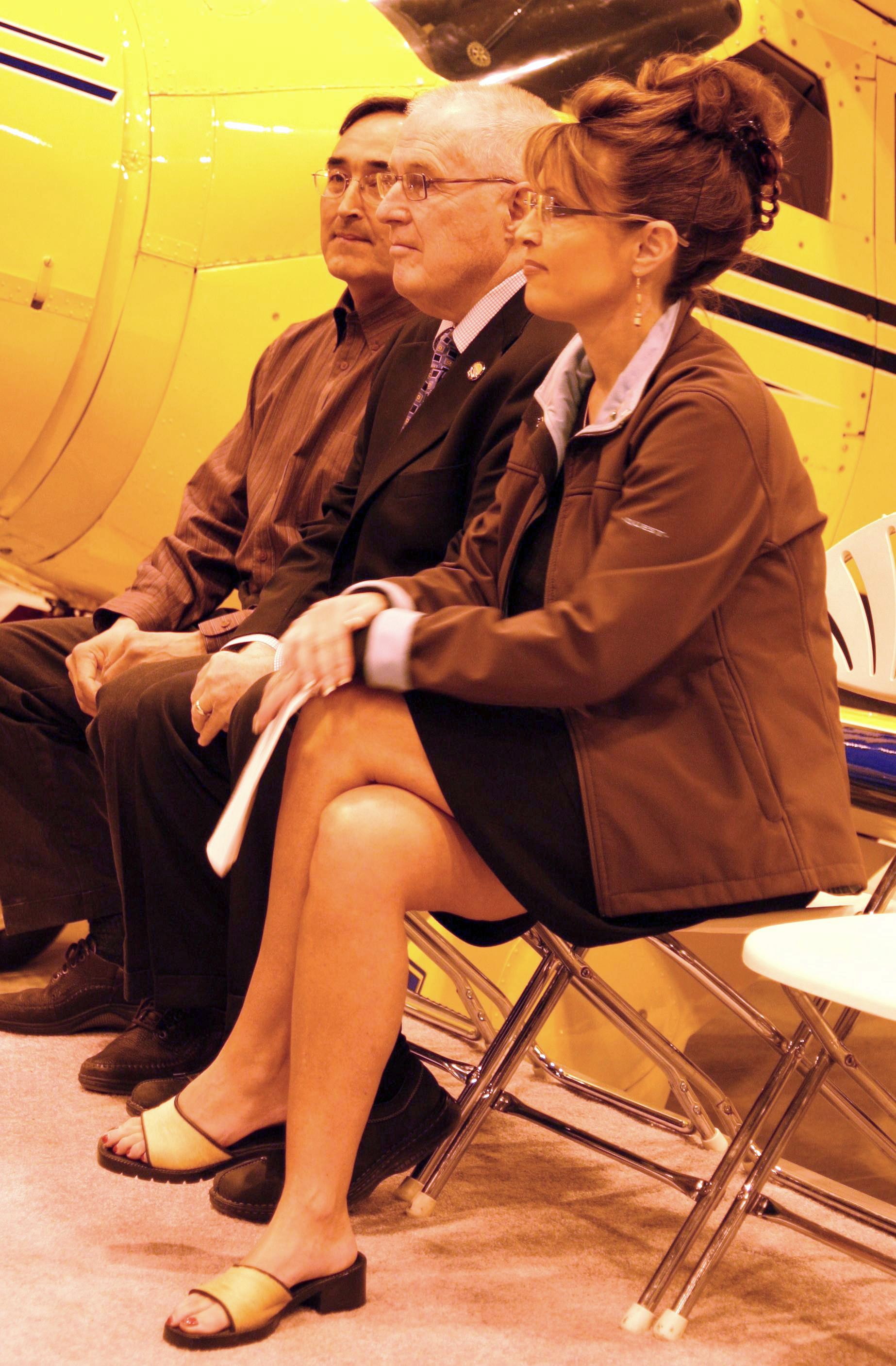
Company president Wilfred "Boyuck" Ryan (left) with Alaska Department of Transportation & Public Facilities Commissioner Leo von Scheben and Alaska governor Sarah Palin in May 2008

Ryan Air, Inc., is an American airline that serves over 70 villages in Bush Alaska out of hubs in Anchorage, Aniak, Bethel, Emmonak, Kotzebue, Nome, St. Mary's, and Unalakleet. Offering primarily cargo services, Ryan Air also operates scheduled passenger service out of Aniak, and passenger or cargo charters throughout Alaska.

== History ==
Ryan Air was established in 1953 as Unalakleet Air Taxi by Wilfred Ryan Sr. as a charter airline. In the 1960s, the company began handling USPS mail delivery and transportation of schoolteachers for the Bureau of Indian Affairs between communities along the lower Yukon River. In 1977, Wilfred P. Ryan Jr. took over the company after his father died of cancer.

In 1979, the company expanded service beyond the Norton Sound and changed their name to Ryan Air. With a new fleet of Beech 1900s and Beech 99s, Ryan Air grew to the largest commuter carrier in Alaska by 1987, serving 85 cities and villages with a fleet of 28 planes. However, a series of 12 accidents, culminating in a fatal crash of flight 103 on 23 November 1987 that killed 18 of the 21 people on board, led the FAA to shut down the airline in January 1988.

In the 1990s, Ryan Air converted to a cargo-only airline and changed their name to Arctic Transportation Services (ATS), adding CASA 212 cargo planes to their fleet. They changed their name back to Ryan Air in 2010.

In 2011, Ryan Air began passenger charters out of Anchorage, using a newly acquired Pilatus PC-12.

In 2014, Ryan Air resumed regularly scheduled passenger services out of Aniak, AK using their Cessna 207 aircraft.

In 2015 Ryan Air acquired a fifth CASA 212.

In 2017 Ryan Air adds 2 SAAB 340s, based in Anchorage, to their fleet.

In 2019 Lee Ryan is appointed as President of Ryan Air, Inc.

In December 2022 Ryan Air was acquired by Saltchuk.

In June 2024 Ryan Air acquired a fourth Cessna 208 EX.

In July of 2025 Ryan Air acquired a second Pilatus PC-12. The new PC-12 is the NG model with executive interior, upgraded avionics and PT6-67P engine/propeller combination.

== Destinations ==
Ryan Air Services maintains the following scheduled passenger routes (as of January 2021):

From/to Aniak

- Aniak - Holy Cross - Anvik - Grayling - Shageluk - Aniak
- Aniak - Kalskag - Russian Mission - Aniak
- Aniak - Chuathbaluk - Crooked Creek - Sleetmute - Stony River - Aniak
- Aniak - Bethel - Aniak (non-stop)
- Aniak - Anchorage - Aniak (non-stop)

From/to Bethel

- Bethel - Chevak - Hooper Bay - Scammon Bay - Bethel
- Bethel - Mekoryuk - Toksook Bay - Tununak - Bethel
- Bethel - Atmautluak - Marhsall - St. Mary's
- Bethel - Aniak (non-stop)
- Aniak - Bethel (non-stop)

From/to Anchorage

- Anchorage - Aniak - Anchorage (non-stop)

== Fleet ==
As of February 2017, the Ryan Air Services fleet consists of 20 aircraft, including:

Ryan Air Services fleet
Aircraft	Number	Passengers	Notes
CASA 212-200	6	—	Cargo
Cessna 207	11	5	Passenger or freight operations
Cessna 208 EX	4	9	Passenger or freight operations
Pilatus PC-12	2	9	Passenger or freight operations
Saab 340	2 (as of August 2025)	—	Cargo
Total	25		

== Accident ==
On 23 November, 1987, Ryan Air Services Flight 103, a Beechcraft 1900C operating a domestic flight in Alaska from Kodiak Airport to Homer Airport, crashed near the runway at Homer Airport, while approaching it. 18 of the 21 people on board were killed. It was determined that the cause of the crash was an improper loading, which led to a loss of control during landing.
