= Kitoi Bay Seaplane Base =

- IATA: KKB; ICAO: none; FAA LID: KKB

Summary
- Airport type: Public
- Owner: Alaska Department of Fish and Game
- Serves: Kitoi Bay, Alaska
- Elevation AMSL: 0 ft (0 m)
- Coordinates: 58°11′27″N 152°22′14″W
- Website: www.adfg.state.ak.us

Map
- Location of airport in Alaska

Runways
Direction	Length		Surface
Direction	ft	m	Surface
E/W	4,000	1,219	Water

Statistics (2006)
- Aircraft operations: 1,800
- Source: Federal Aviation Administration

Kitoi Bay Seaplane Base (IATA: KKB, FAA LID: KKB) is a public use seaplane base owned by the Alaska Department of Fish and Game and located in Kitoi Bay, in the Kodiak Island Borough of the U.S. state of Alaska. It is included in the National Plan of Integrated Airport Systems for 2011–2015, which categorized it as a general aviation facility.

Scheduled passenger service to Kodiak, Alaska, is subsidized by the United States Department of Transportation via the Essential Air Service program.

== Facilities and aircraft ==
Kitoi Bay Seaplane Base has one seaplane landing area designated E/W with a water surface measuring 4,000 by 1,000 feet (1,219 x 305 m). For the 12-month period ending December 31, 2006, the airport had 1,800 aircraft operations, an average of 150 per month: 83% air taxi and 17% general aviation.

== Airline and destinations ==
The following airline offers scheduled passenger service:

Airlines	Destinations
Island Air Service	Kodiak, Port Williams, Seal Bay

=== Statistics ===
Carrier shares: January – December 2013
Carrier	Passengers (arriving and departing)
Island	100(100%)

Top domestic destinations: Jan. – Dec. 2013
Rank	City	Airport name & IATA code	Passengers	
Rank	City	Airport name & IATA code	2013	2012
1	Kodiak, AK	Kodiak Airport (ADQ)	30	30

== Climate ==
The climate type of Kitoi Bay is closer to Kodiak. Given that the average temperature in September is 49.8 °F (9.9 °C), it is classified as a subarctic climate (Köppen: Dfc), but there are both bordered the humid continental (Köppen: Dfb) and subpolar oceanic (Köppen: Cfc).

Climate data for Kitoi Bay Seaplane Base, Alaska (1991-2020)
Month	Jan	Feb	Mar	Apr	May	Jun	Jul	Aug	Sep	Oct	Nov	Dec	Year
Record high °F (°C)	50 (10)	54 (12)	56 (13)	65 (18)	78 (26)	87 (31)	82 (28)	83 (28)	75 (24)	65 (18)	61 (16)	56 (13)	87 (31)
Mean maximum °F (°C)	43.0 (6.1)	42.7 (5.9)	47.3 (8.5)	54.2 (12.3)	66.1 (18.9)	71.6 (22.0)	75.5 (24.2)	72.8 (22.7)	65.6 (18.7)	54.9 (12.7)	47.2 (8.4)	44.3 (6.8)	78.0 (25.6)
Mean daily maximum °F (°C)	34.3 (1.3)	36.2 (2.3)	38.0 (3.3)	44.1 (6.7)	51.5 (10.8)	57.0 (13.9)	61.6 (16.4)	62.2 (16.8)	56.0 (13.3)	46.7 (8.2)	39.1 (3.9)	34.7 (1.5)	46.8 (8.2)
Daily mean °F (°C)	29.9 (−1.2)	31.4 (−0.3)	32.0 (0.0)	38.2 (3.4)	44.6 (7.0)	50.3 (10.2)	54.9 (12.7)	55.5 (13.1)	49.8 (9.9)	40.9 (4.9)	34.3 (1.3)	30.1 (−1.1)	41.0 (5.0)
Mean daily minimum °F (°C)	25.5 (−3.6)	26.7 (−2.9)	26.1 (−3.3)	32.3 (0.2)	37.7 (3.2)	43.6 (6.4)	48.2 (9.0)	48.9 (9.4)	43.5 (6.4)	35.2 (1.8)	29.5 (−1.4)	25.4 (−3.7)	35.2 (1.8)
Mean minimum °F (°C)	8.7 (−12.9)	11.8 (−11.2)	11.5 (−11.4)	20.9 (−6.2)	29.9 (−1.2)	36.7 (2.6)	42.7 (5.9)	41.5 (5.3)	33.7 (0.9)	25.4 (−3.7)	17.6 (−8.0)	10.3 (−12.1)	3.6 (−15.8)
Record low °F (°C)	−20 (−29)	−6 (−21)	−6 (−21)	2 (−17)	19 (−7)	28 (−2)	35 (2)	32 (0)	25 (−4)	10 (−12)	2 (−17)	−14 (−26)	−20 (−29)
Average precipitation inches (mm)	6.13 (156)	5.36 (136)	4.38 (111)	5.39 (137)	4.67 (119)	3.68 (93)	3.68 (93)	4.85 (123)	6.61 (168)	7.93 (201)	5.97 (152)	7.01 (178)	65.66 (1,668)
Average snowfall inches (cm)	12.4 (31)	6.6 (17)	3.3 (8.4)	0.7 (1.8)	0.0 (0.0)	0.0 (0.0)	0.0 (0.0)	0.0 (0.0)	0.0 (0.0)	0.1 (0.25)	3.9 (9.9)	9.8 (25)	36.8 (93)
Average precipitation days (≥ 0.01 in)	18.5	16.9	14.9	17.9	15.5	13.7	13.6	14.5	16.1	18.4	17.3	18.5	195.8
Average snowy days (≥ 0.1 in)	5.5	3.4	1.7	0.3	0.0	0.0	0.0	0.0	0.0	0.1	2.6	5.5	19.1
Source 1: NOAA
Source 2: XMACIS2 (mean maxima/minima 1991–2020)

== See also ==
- List of airports in Alaska

== Other sources ==
- Essential Air Service documents (Docket DOT-OST-2000-6945) from the U.S. Department of Transportation:
  - Order 2005-3-4 (March 3, 2005): selecting Servant Air, Inc. to provide essential air service at Amook Bay, Kitoi Bay, Moser Bay, Olga Bay, Port Bailey, Port William, Seal Bay, West Point, and Zachar Bay, Alaska (Kodiak Bush), at the annual subsidy rate of $149,595 per year for the two-year period beginning with its inauguration of service.
  - Order 2007-5-18 (May 31, 2007): selecting Redemption, Inc., d/b/a Island Air Service, to provide essential air service (EAS) at Alitak, Amook Bay, Kitoi Bay, Moser Bay, Olga Bay, Port Bailey, Port Williams, Seal Bay, Uganik, West Point, Zachar Bay, Alaska (Kodiak 11), at subsidy rates of $152,534 annually, and at Karluk, Alaska, for $29,481 annually, through June 30, 2009.
  - Order 2009-4-23 (April 28, 2009): re-selecting Redemption, Inc., d/b/a Island Air Service, to provide essential air service at Alitak, Amook Bay, Kitoi Bay, Moser Bay, Olga Bay, Port Bailey, Port Williams, Seal Bay, West Point, Uganik, and Zachar Bay (Kodiak 11), Alaska, at a combined annual subsidy rate of $143,061 through October 31, 2011.
  - Order 2011-7-6 (July 19, 2011): re-selecting Redemption, Inc., d/b/a Island Air Service, to provide essential air service at Alitak, Amook Bay, Kitoi Bay, Moser Bay, Olga Bay, Port Bailey, Port Williams, Seal Bay, West Point, Uganik, and Zachar Bay, Alaska (Kodiak 11), at a combined annual subsidy rate of $144,972, from November 1, 2011, through October 31, 2013. Service levels were set at two round trips per week to Kodiak (ADQ) during the 18-week peak season and one round trip per week during the remainder of the year, all with DHC-2 Beaver aircraft.
  - Order 2013-9-12 (September 20, 2013): re-selecting Redemption Inc., d/b/a Island Air Service, to provide Essential Air Service (EAS) at Alitak, Amook Bay, Kitoi Bay, Moser Bay, Olga Bay, Port Bailey, Port Williams, Seal Bay, Uganik, West Point, and Zachar Bay, Alaska (Kodiak 11), for $124,663 annual subsidy from November 1, 2013, through October 31, 2015. Scheduled Service: 18-week peak period, 21-week shoulder, 13-week off-peak. Aircraft: DHC-2, Beaver, 6 seats.
