= Amook Bay Seaplane Base =

Airport in Alaska, USA

- IATA: AOS; ICAO: none; FAA LID: AK81

Summary
- Airport type: Private
- Owner: Mike Munsey
- Serves: Amook Bay, Alaska
- Elevation AMSL: 0 ft (0 m)
- Coordinates: 57°28′17″N 153°48′55″W

Map
- Location of airport in Alaska

Runways
Direction	Length		Surface
Direction	ft	m	Surface
N/S	8,000	2,438	Water

Statistics (2015)
- Passengers: 57
- Freight: 12,000 lbs
- Source: Federal Aviation Administration

Amook Bay Seaplane Base (IATA: AOS, FAA LID: AK81) is a privately owned seaplane base located in Amook Bay, a community in the Kodiak Island Borough of the U.S. state of Alaska.

Although classified by the FAA as "private use", Amook Bay has scheduled passenger service to Kodiak, Alaska, which is subsidized by the United States Department of Transportation via the Essential Air Service program.

== Facilities and aircraft ==
Amook Bay Seaplane Base has one seaplane landing area designated N/S with a water surface measuring 8,000 by 700 feet (2,438 x 213 m). For the 12-month period ending June 12, 1978, the airport had 170 aircraft operations, an average of 14 per month: 71% general aviation and 29% air taxi.

== Airline and destinations ==
The following airline offers scheduled passenger service:

Airlines	Destinations
Island Air Service	Kodiak, Zachar Bay

=== Statistics ===
Carrier shares: August 2019 – July 2020
Carrier	Passengers (arriving and departing)
Island Air	60(100%)

Top domestic destinations: August 2019 – July 2020
Rank	City	Airport name & IATA code	Passengers
1	Zachar Bay, AK	Zachar Bay Seaplane Base (KZB)	30

== See also ==
- List of airports in Alaska

== Other sources ==
- Essential Air Service documents (Docket DOT-OST-2000-6945) from the U.S. Department of Transportation:
  - Order 2005-3-4 (March 3, 2005): selecting Servant Air, Inc. to provide essential air service at Amook Bay, Kitoi Bay, Moser Bay, Olga Bay, Port Bailey, Port William, Seal Bay, West Point, and Zachar Bay, Alaska (Kodiak Bush), at the annual subsidy rate of $149,595 per year for the two-year period beginning with its inauguration of service.
  - Order 2007-5-18 (May 31, 2007): selecting Redemption, Inc., d/b/a Island Air Service, to provide essential air service (EAS) at Alitak, Amook Bay, Kitoi Bay, Moser Bay, Olga Bay, Port Bailey, Port Williams, Seal Bay, Uganik, West Point, Zachar Bay, Alaska (Kodiak 11), at subsidy rates of $152,534 annually, and at Karluk, Alaska, for $29,481 annually, through June 30, 2009.
  - Order 2009-4-23 (April 28, 2009): re-selecting Redemption, Inc., d/b/a Island Air Service, to provide essential air service at Alitak, Amook Bay, Kitoi Bay, Moser Bay, Olga Bay, Port Bailey, Port Williams, Seal Bay, West Point, Uganik, and Zachar Bay (Kodiak 11), Alaska, at a combined annual subsidy rate of $143,061 through October 31, 2011.
  - Order 2011-7-6 (July 19, 2011): re-selecting Redemption, Inc., d/b/a Island Air Service, to provide essential air service at Alitak, Amook Bay, Kitoi Bay, Moser Bay, Olga Bay, Port Bailey, Port Williams, Seal Bay, West Point, Uganik, and Zachar Bay, Alaska (Kodiak 11), at a combined annual subsidy rate of $144,972, from November 1, 2011, through October 31, 2013. Service levels were set at two round trips per week to Kodiak (ADQ) during the 18-week peak season and one round trip per week during the remainder of the year, all with DHC-2 Beaver aircraft.
  - Order 2013-9-12 (September 20, 2013): re-selecting Redemption Inc., d/b/a Island Air Service, to provide Essential Air Service (EAS) at Alitak, Amook Bay, Kitoi Bay, Moser Bay, Olga Bay, Port Bailey, Port Williams, Seal Bay, Uganik, West Point, and Zachar Bay, Alaska (Kodiak 11), for $124,663 annual subsidy from November 1, 2013, through October 31, 2015. Scheduled Service: 18-week peak period, 21-week shoulder, 13-week off-peak. Aircraft: DHC-2, Beaver, 6 seats.
