= Uganik =

Uganik may refer to:

- Uganik Island - off the west coast of Kodiak Island, Alaska
- Uganik, Alaska - on Kodiak Island in Alaska
