= KLN =

KLN may refer to:

- KLN Logistics Group Limited, a logistics company based in Hong Kong
- King's Lynn railway station, National Rail station code KLN
- Kowloon
- Larsen Bay Airport, IATA code KLN
- Nandi–Markweta languages, ISO language code kln
