= KYK =

KYK or kyk may refer to:

- Karluk Airport (IATA and FAA LID code), Alaska, United States
- Kamayo language (ISO 639-3 language code), a language native to Philippines
