= KKB =

KKB may refer to:'

- KKB, a 70's American rock band, featuring future Kiss lead Bruce Kulick
- Kero Kero Bonito, an English indie pop band
- Kumkum Bhagya, an Indian soap opera
- Basel Boys Choir (German: Knabenkantorei Basel)
- Beznau Nuclear Power Plant (German: Kernkraftwerk Beznau)
- Kitoi Bay Seaplane Base, Kodiak Island, Alaska, United States
- Kuala Kubu Bharu, Selangor, Malaysia
- Kouadio Konan Bertin, an Ivorian politician
- Kagoshima Broadcasting, a television station in Kagoshima Prefecture, Japan
- West Papua National Liberation Army, referred to by the Indonesian government as the Kelompok Kriminal Bersenjata (Armed Criminal Group)
