= KPY =

KPY or kpy means:

- Karunagappalli railway station, Kerala, India, by Indian Railways station code
- Koryak language (ISO 639-3 code)
- Port Bailey Seaplane Base
