= KMY =

KMY or kmy may refer to:

- KMY, the IATA and FAA LID code for Moser Bay Seaplane Base, Alaska, United States
- kmy, the ISO 639-3 code for Koma Ndera language
