= OLH (disambiguation) =

OLH may refer to:

- Open Library of Humanities, a nonprofit, diamond open access publisher
- Old Harbor Airport, the IATA code OLH
- Our Lady of the Hills High School, a private, Roman Catholic high school in Kerrville, Texas
- Officer (OLH), a rank of the Philippine Legion of Honor
