= AKK =

AKK may refer to:

- Akk tribe, an ancient South Arabian tribe
- AKK-Motorsport, a Finnish motorsport organisation
- Alaskan Klee Kai, a northern breed of dog in the spitz family
- Alpha Kappa Kappa, US medical school fraternity
- Annegret Kramp-Karrenbauer (born 1962), German politician
- Akhiok Airport's IATA airport code
- Akkadian language's ISO 639-2 and ISO 639-3 code
