= Barometer Mountain =

Mountain in Alaska, United States

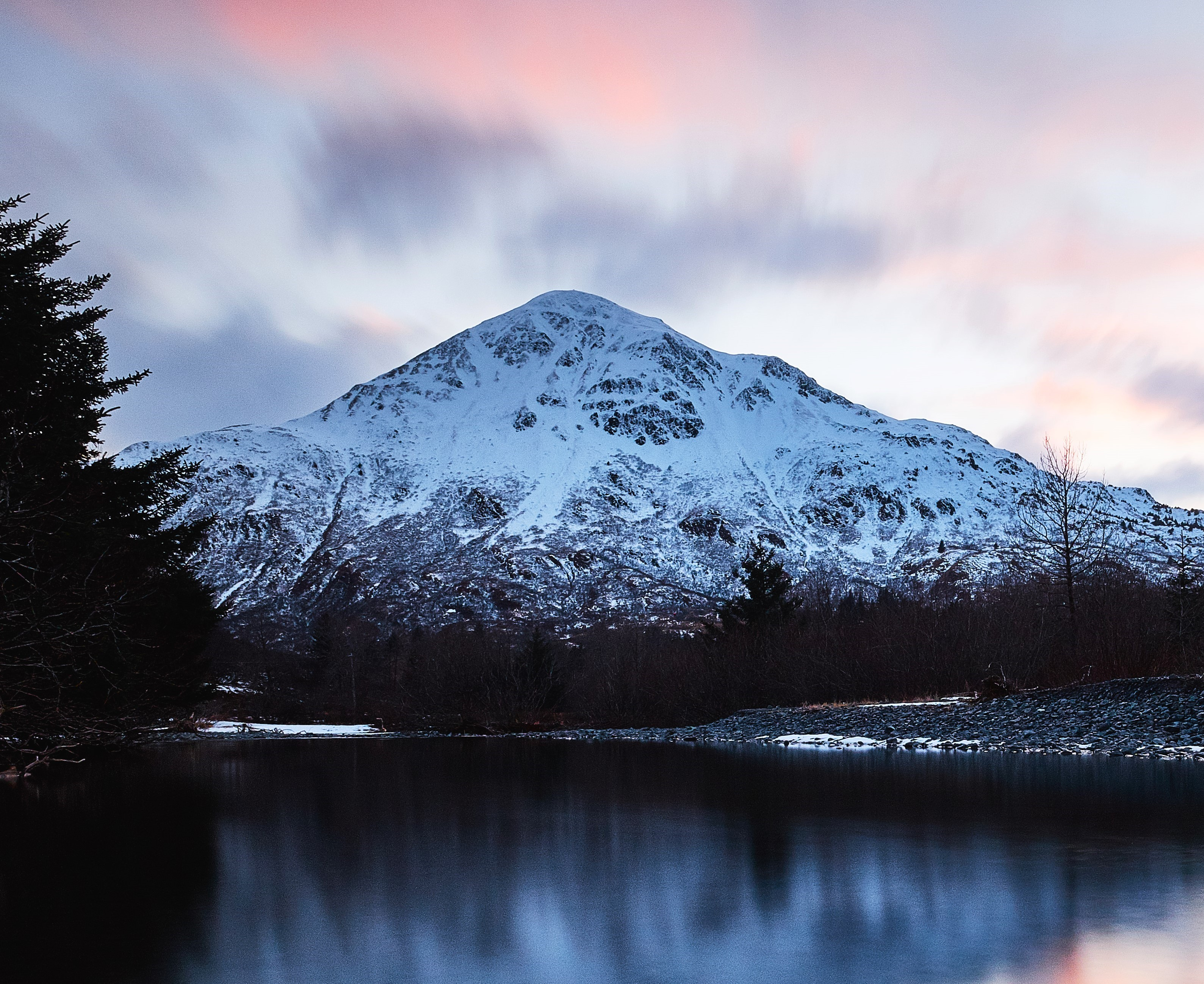
- East aspect

Highest point
- Elevation: 2,506 ft (764 m)
- Prominence: 745 ft (227 m)
- Parent peak: Erskine Mountain (2,657 ft)
- Isolation: 2.12 mi (3.41 km)
- Coordinates: 57°45′16″N 152°32′54″W

Geography
- Location within Alaska
- Interactive map of Barometer Mountain
- Country: United States
- State: Alaska
- Borough: Kodiak Island Borough
- Parent range: Kodiak Archipelago
- Topo map: USGS Kodiak D-2

Climbing
- Easiest route: Trail class 2+

Barometer Mountain is a 2,506-foot-elevation (764-meter) summit in Alaska.

== Description ==
Barometer Mountain is located six miles (9.7 km) southwest of Kodiak on the northeast coast of Kodiak Island. It ranks as the 10th-highest peak on the island, and it is considered Kodiak's most popular mountain. Precipitation runoff from the mountain drains north into Buskin Lake, east to the Buskin River, and south to Devils Creek. Topographic relief is significant as the summit rises 2,200 feet (671 meters) above Devils Creek in 0.85 miles (1.37 km) and the summit is one mile (1.6 km) from the end of a runway at Kodiak Airport. On November 8, 1988, an F-15C from the 21st Tactical Fighter Wing crashed in low visibility into Barometer Mountain and the pilot was killed. The mountain's descriptive name was applied in 1867 by the United States Coast and Geodetic Survey because the behavior of fog and clouds forming on the mountain was said to be predictive of approaching weather. The toponym has been officially adopted by the United States Board on Geographic Names.

== Climate ==
According to the Köppen climate classification system, Barometer Mountain is located in a subpolar oceanic climate zone with cold, snowy winters, and cool summers. Weather systems coming off the North Pacific are forced upwards by the mountains (orographic lift), causing heavy precipitation in the form of rainfall and snowfall. Winter temperatures can drop to 0 °F with wind chill factors below −10 °F.

== Gallery ==
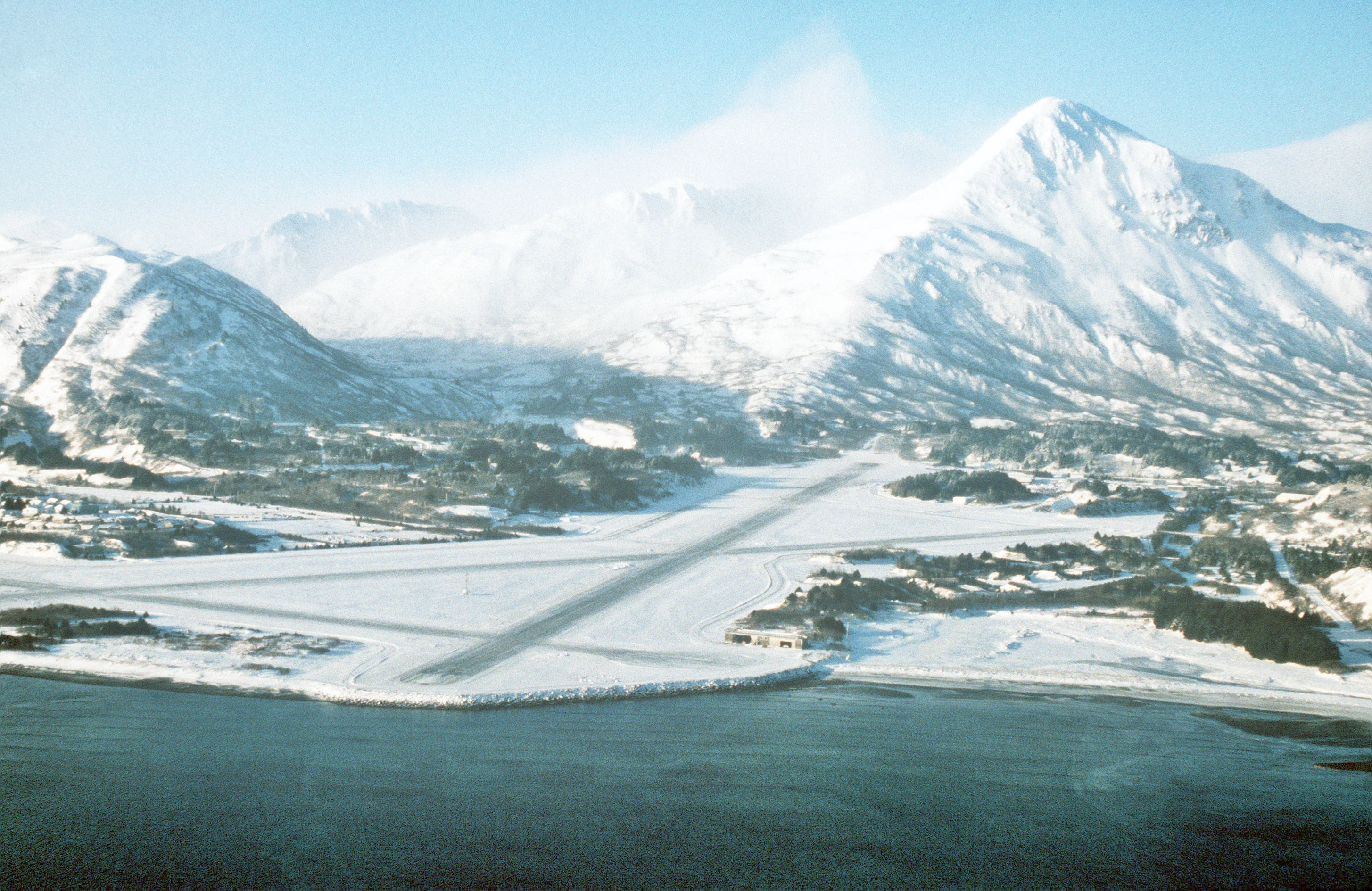
Barometer Mountain and Kodiak Airport

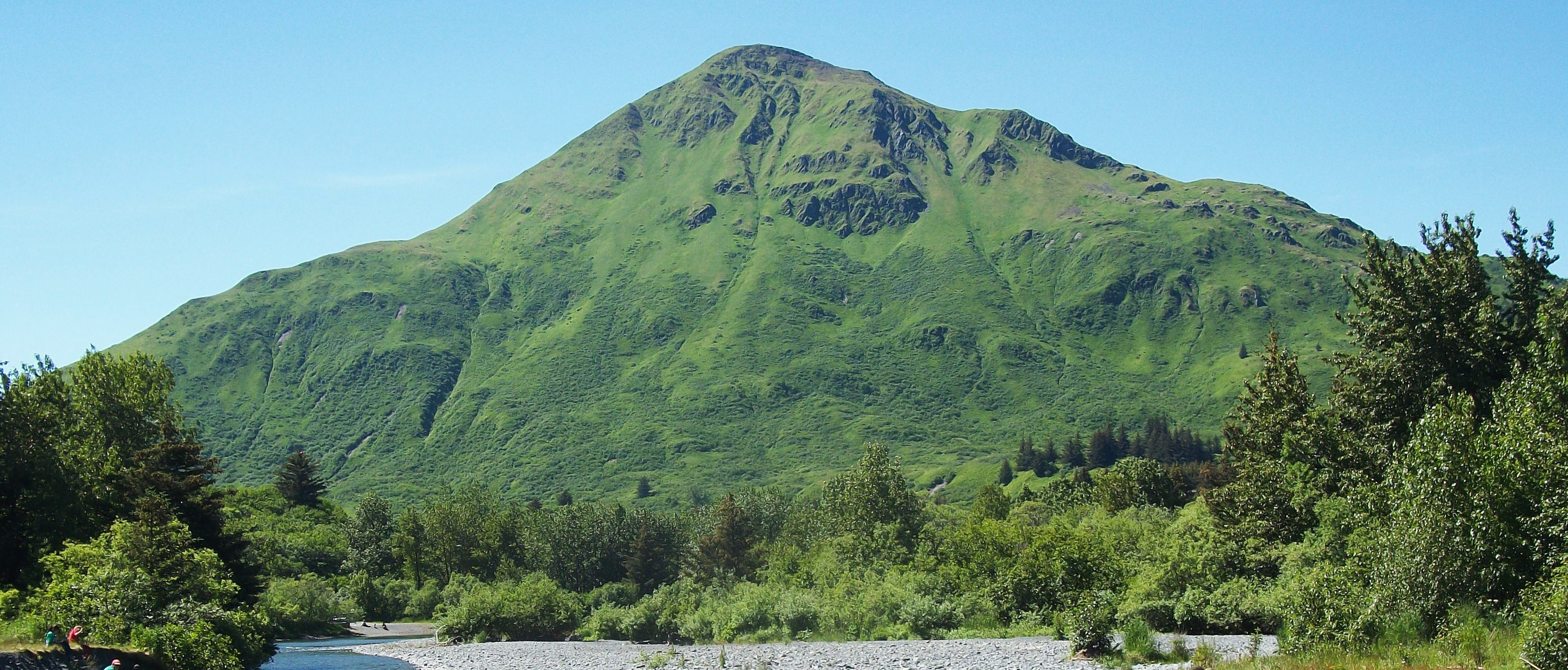
East aspect

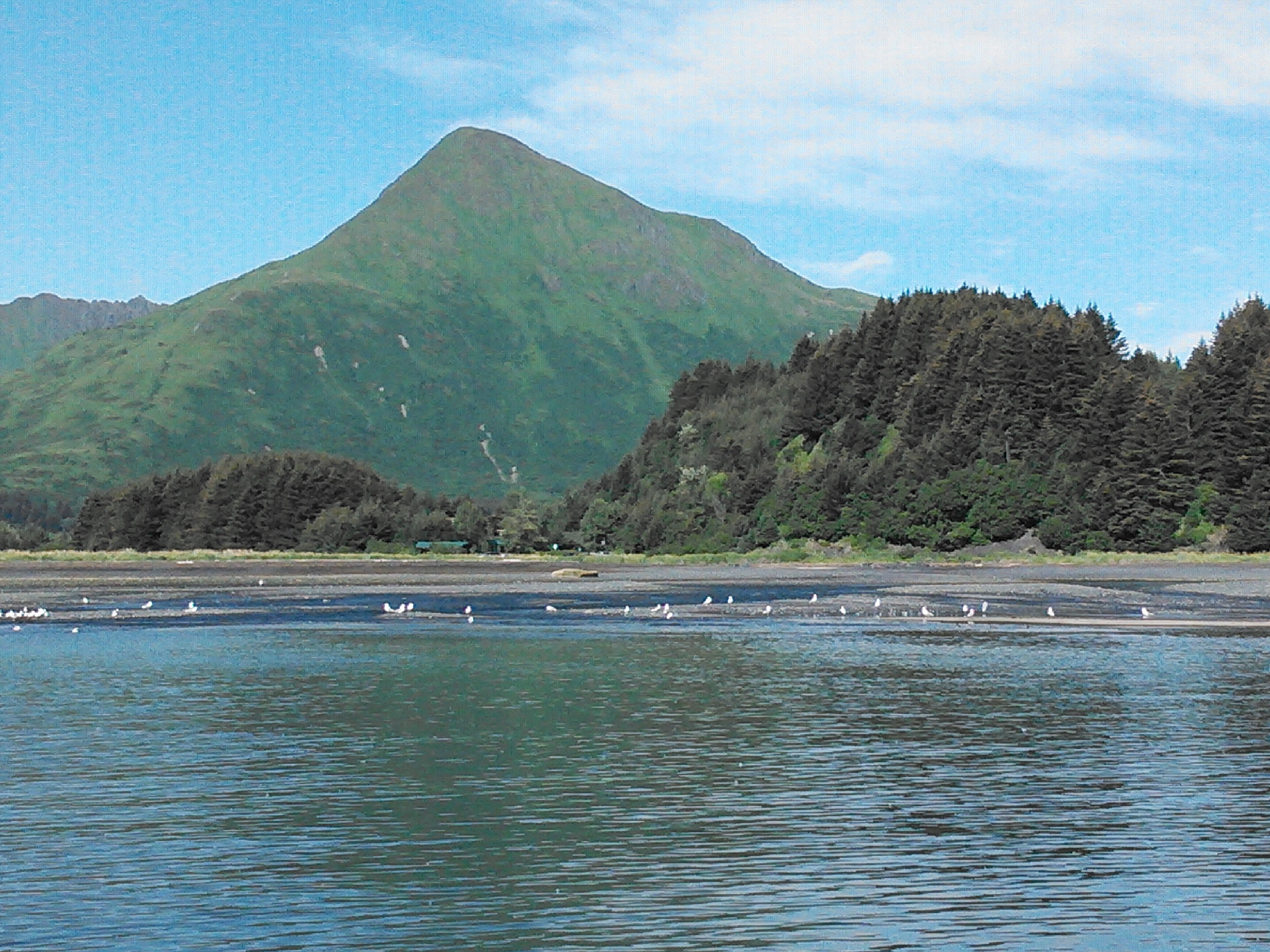

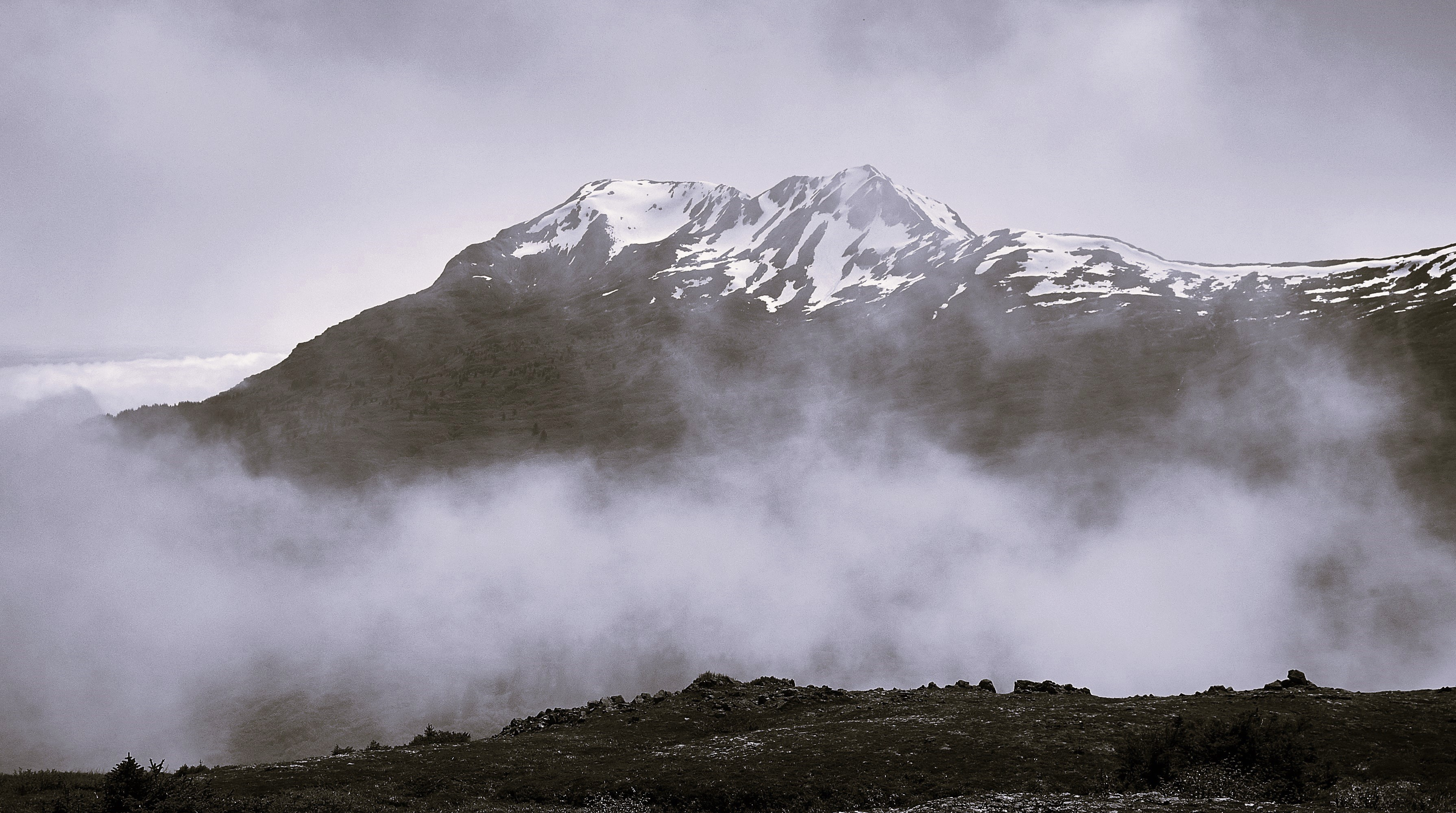
Northwest aspect

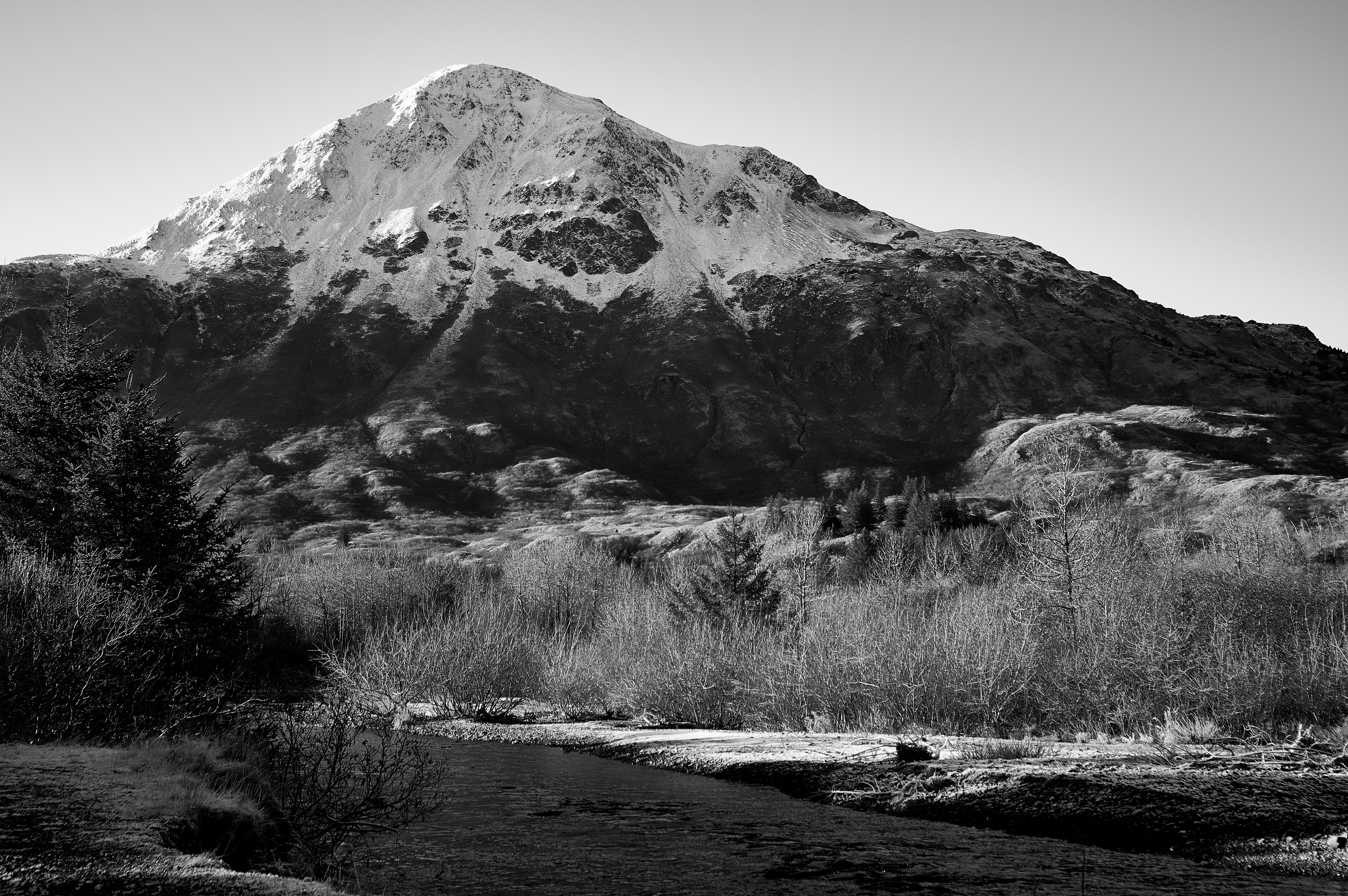

== See also ==
- List of mountain peaks of Alaska
- Geography of Alaska
