= WSJ (disambiguation) =

WSJ, or The Wall Street Journal (founded 1889), is an American business-focused daily newspaper.

WSJ or wsj may also refer to:

- Topics related to The Wall Street Journal
  - The Wall Street Journal Asia (1976–2017), a former Asian edition
  - The Wall Street Journal Europe (1983–2017), a former European edition
  - WSJ. (2008–present), a monthly magazine insert by the newspaper
- Weekly Shōnen Jump (1968–present), a Japanese manga magazine
- Winston-Salem Journal (founded 1897), an American newspaper in Winston-Salem, North Carolina
- Wisconsin State Journal (founded 1839), an American newspaper in Madison, Wisconsin
- World Scout Jamboree, a quadrennial international Scouting event held since 1920
- San Juan (Uganik) Seaplane Base, Alaska, United States (FAA code: WSJ)
