= Port Lions Airport =

Airport in Alaska, United States

- IATA: ORI; ICAO: PORI; FAA LID: ORI

Summary
- Airport type: Public
- Owner: Alaska DOT&PF - Central Region
- Serves: Port Lions, Alaska
- Elevation AMSL: 52 ft (16 m)
- Coordinates: 57°53′07″N 152°50′46″W

Map
- Location of airport in Alaska

Runways
| Direction | Length | | Surface |
| Direction | ft | m | Surface |
|---|---|---|---|
| 7/25 | 2,200 | 671 | Gravel |

Statistics (2006)
- Aircraft operations: 5,300
- Source: Federal Aviation Administration

Port Lions Airport (IATA: ORI, ICAO: PORI, FAA LID: ORI) is a state-owned, public-use airport located two nautical miles (3.7 km; 2.3 mi) northeast of the central business district of Port Lions, a city located on Kodiak Island in the Kodiak Island Borough of the U.S. state of Alaska.

Federal Aviation Administration records report that the airport had 2,386 passenger boardings (enplanements) in the calendar year 2008, 2,666 enplanements in 2009, and 2,257 in 2010. It is included in the National Plan of Integrated Airport Systems for 2011–2015, which categorized it as a general aviation facility (the commercial service category requires at least 2,500 enplanements per year).

== Facilities and aircraft ==
Port Lions Airport covers an area of 32 acres (13 hectares) at an elevation of 52 feet (16 m) above mean sea level. It has one runway designated 7/25 with a gravel surface measuring 2,200 by 75 feet (671 by 23 m). For the 12-months ending December 31, 2006, the airport had 5,300 aircraft operations, an average of 14 per day: 91% air taxi and 9% general aviation.

== Airlines and destinations ==
Airlines with scheduled passenger service to non-stop destinations:

| Airlines | Destinations |
|---|---|
| Island Air Service | Kodiak, Ouzinkie |

=== Statistics ===
Carrier shares: January – December 2012
| Carrier | Passengers (arriving and departing) |
|---|---|
| Island | 2,200(72.6%) |
| Servant | 830(27.4%) |

Top domestic destinations: Jan. – Dec. 2012
| Rank | City | Airport | Passengers |
|---|---|---|---|
| 1 | Kodiak, AK | Kodiak Airport (ADQ) | 1,610 |
| 2 | Ouzinkie, AK | Ouzinkie Airport (KOZ) | 50 |

== See also ==
- List of airports in Alaska
