= Ouzinkie Airport =

- IATA: KOZ; ICAO: PAAE; FAA LID: 4K5

Summary
- Airport type: Public
- Owner: State of Alaska DOT&PF - Central Region
- Serves: Ouzinkie, Alaska
- Elevation AMSL: 100 ft (30 m)
- Coordinates: 57°56′32″N 152°27′54″W

Map
- Location of airport in Alaska

Runways
Direction	Length		Surface
Direction	ft	m	Surface
8/26	3,300	1,006	Gravel
- Source: Federal Aviation Administration

Ouzinkie Airport (IATA: KOZ, ICAO: PAAE, FAA LID: 4K5) is a state-owned public-use airport serving Ouzinkie, a city on Spruce Island in the Kodiak Island Borough of the U.S. state of Alaska.

The airport received national media attention in 2009 after being slotted to receive $15 million in federal stimulus money to construct a new airstrip. The new airport opened in 2010.

Below is a table of the annual check-ins at the airport as per Federal Aviation Administration records.

Table
Year	enplanement
2008	2,071
2009	2,999
2010	2,784
2011	(unavailable)
2012	(unavailable)
2013	1,862
2014	1,897
2015	1,610
2016	922
2017	1,432
2018	1,347
2019	1,258
2020	1,084
2021	1,337
2022	1,410
2023	(unavailable)
2024	(unavailable)
2025	(unavailable)

It is included in the National Plan of Integrated Airport Systems for 2011–2015, which categorized it as a general aviation facility based on enplanements in 2008 (the commercial service category requires at least 2,500 per year).

== Facilities ==
Ouzinkie Airport covers an area of 170 acres (69 ha) at an elevation of 100 feet (30 m) above mean sea level. It has one runway designated 8/26 with a gravel surface measuring 3,300 by 60 feet (1,006 x 18 m).

The former location (57°55′31″N 152°29′49″W) had one runway designated 11/29 with a gravel surface measuring 2,085 by 80 feet (636 x 24 m). For the 12-month period ending December 31, 2006, it had 42 aircraft operations per month: 60% general aviation and 40% air taxi.

== Airline and destinations ==
Airlines with scheduled passenger service to non-stop destinations:

Airlines	Destinations
Island Air Service	Kodiak, Port Lions

=== Statistics ===
Carrier shares: January – December 2012
Carrier	Passengers (arriving and departing)
Island	2,370(71.3%)
Servant	950(28.7%)

Top domestic destinations: Jan. – Dec. 2012
Rank	City	Airport	Passengers
1	Kodiak, AK	Kodiak Airport (ADQ)	1,700
2	Port Lions, AK	Port Lions Airport (ORI)	60

== See also ==
- List of airports in Alaska
