= Akhiok Airport =

Airport in Alaska, United States

- IATA: AKK; ICAO: PAKH; FAA LID: AKK

Summary
- Airport type: Public
- Owner: State of Alaska DOT&PF - Central Region
- Serves: Akhiok, Alaska
- Elevation AMSL: 44 ft (13 m)
- Coordinates: 56°56′19″N 154°10′57″W

Map
- Location of airport in Alaska

Runways
Direction	Length		Surface
Direction	ft	m	Surface
4/22	3,120	951	Gravel

Statistics (2015)
- Aircraft operations: 1,600 (2013)
- Based aircraft: 0
- Passengers: 1,150
- Freight: 115,000 lbs
- Source: Federal Aviation Administration

Akhiok Airport (IATA: AKK, ICAO: PAKH, FAA LID: AKK) is a state-owned public-use airport located one nautical mile (2 km) southwest of the central business district of Akhiok, a city in the Kodiak Island Borough of the U.S. state of Alaska.

As per Federal Aviation Administration records, the airport had 1,220 passenger boardings (enplanements) in calendar year 2008, 1,356 enplanements in 2009, and 1,209 in 2010. It is included in the National Plan of Integrated Airport Systems for 2011–15, which categorized it as a general aviation facility (the commercial service category requires at least 2,500 enplanements per year).

Scheduled passenger service was subsidized by the U.S. Department of Transportation via the Essential Air Service program until the end of March 2010, after which Servant Air began providing subsidy-free service.

== Facilities and aircraft ==
Akhiok Airport resides at an elevation of 44 feet (13 m) above mean sea level. It has one runway designated 4/22 with a gravel surface measuring 3,120 by 50 feet (951 x 15 m). For the 12-month period ending December 31, 2006, the airport had 1,600 aircraft operations, an average of 133 per month: 94% air taxi and 6% general aviation.

== Airlines and destinations ==
The following airlines offer scheduled passenger service at this airport:

Airlines	Destinations
Island Air Service	Kodiak, Old Harbor

=== Statistics ===
Carrier shares: January 2015 – December 2015
Carrier	Passengers (arriving and departing)
Servant	850(74.1%)
Island	300(25.9%)

Top domestic destinations: Jan. 2015 – Dec. 2015
Rank	City	Airport	Passengers
1	Kodiak, AK	Kodiak Airport (ADQ)	560
2	Old Harbor, AK	Old Harbor Airport (OLH)	40
3	Larsen Bay, AK	Larsen Bay Airport (KLN)	10

== See also ==
- List of airports in Alaska

== Other sources ==
- Essential Air Service documents (Docket DOT-OST-2007-0020) from the U.S. Department of Transportation:
  - Order 2008-2-10 (February 6, 2008): selecting Servant Air, Inc. to provide subsidized essential air service (EAS) at Akhiok, Alaska, for the two-year period beginning when the carrier inaugurates scheduled passenger service pursuant to this order, at an annual subsidy of $51,079 for service to Kodiak with 5-seat Piper PA-32R-300 aircraft.
  - Order 2010-2-15 (February 17, 2010): relying on Servant Air, Inc., to provide subsidy-free essential air service (EAS) at Akhiok and Karluk, Alaska, and terminating the carrier-selection case effective April 1, 2010, when the currently effective EAS contract at each community expires.
