= Uganik Bay =

Bay in Kodiak Island Borough, Alaska, United States

Coordinates: 57°48′18″N 153°30′46″W

Uganik Bay is a bay on the north coast of Kodiak Island, Alaska, extending southeast off Shelikof Strait. The Uganik River empties into it. The community of Uganik is found at the west shore of the northeast arm of the bay.

There are several small islands in the bay. A group called the Village Islands is found on the west shore of the bay. Most are unnamed in the Geographic Names Information System, except Green Island.
