= Uganik River =

River in Alaska, the United States of America

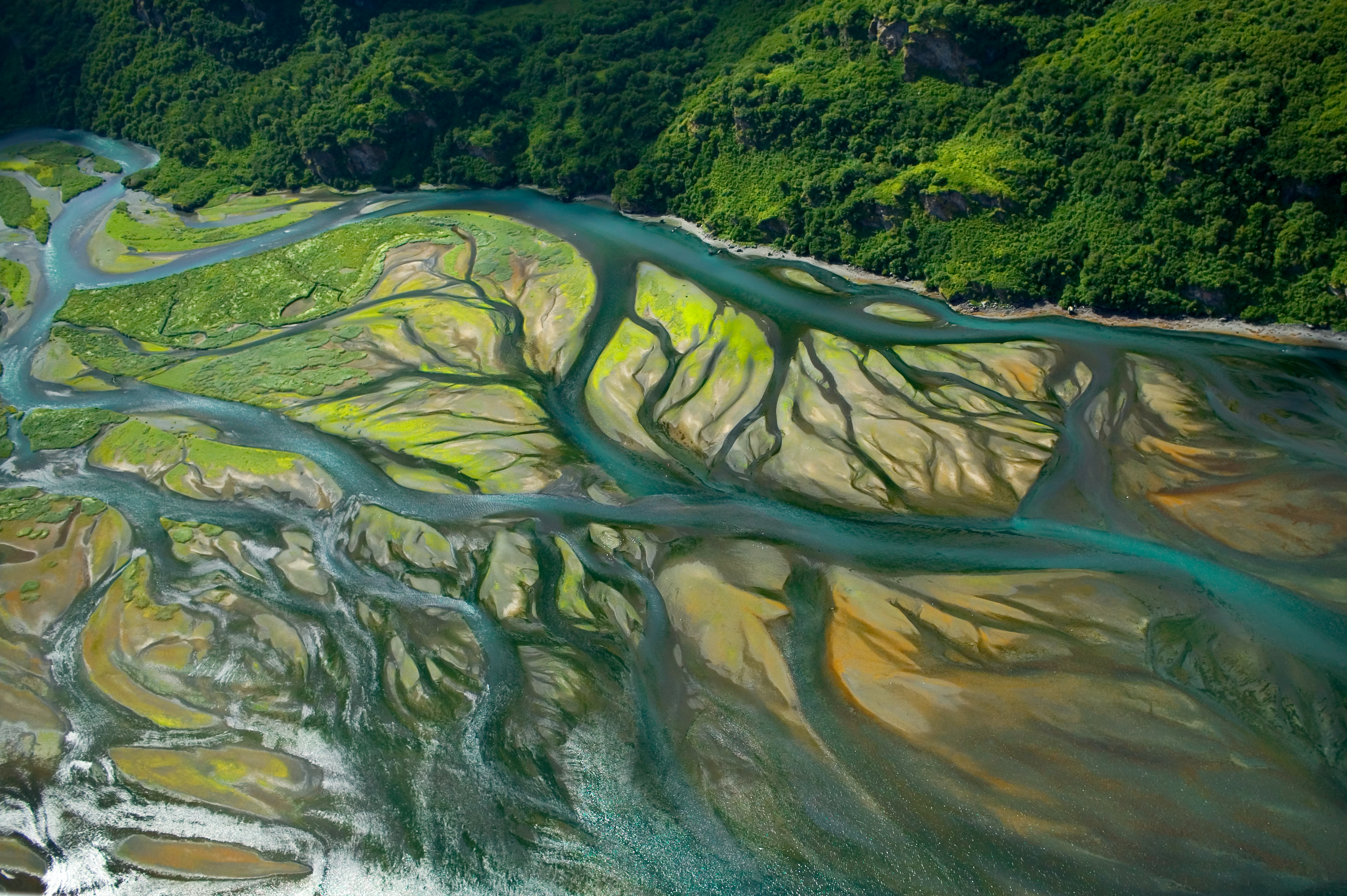

- Location within Alaska

Location
- Country: United States
- State: Alaska
- Borough: Kodiak Island

Physical characteristics
- Source
  - location: Various small lakes and glaciers
  - elevation: 2,500 ft (760 m)
- Mouth: Uganik Bay
  - coordinates: 57°41′26.9″N 153°26′02.3″W
  - elevation: 0 ft (0 m)
- Length: 3.5 mi (5.6 km)

The Uganik River is a river on Kodiak Island in the state of Alaska. It is 20 miles (32 km) long, and is 34 miles (55 km) southwest of the island's main city of Kodiak, Alaska. It begins from various small glaciers and lakes and flows generally northwest through before reaching Uganik Lake. It emerges from the lake to empty into the East Arm of Uganik Bay on the island's west coast. The river passes through the Kodiak National Wildlife Refuge.

== See also ==
- List of rivers of Alaska
