= Old Harbor Airport =

Airport in Alaska, United States

- IATA: OLH; ICAO: none; FAA LID: 6R7

Summary
- Airport type: Public
- Owner: State of Alaska DOT&PF - Central Region
- Serves: Old Harbor, Alaska
- Elevation AMSL: 55 ft (17 m)
- Coordinates: 57°13′06″N 153°16′09″W

Map
- Location of airport in Alaska

Runways
| Direction | Length | | Surface |
| Direction | ft | m | Surface |
|---|---|---|---|
| 3/21 | 2,750 | 838 | Gravel |
- Source: Federal Aviation Administration

Old Harbor Airport (IATA: OLH, FAA LID: 6R7) is a state owned, public use airport located two nautical miles (4 km) northeast of the central business district of Old Harbor, a city in the Kodiak Island Borough in the U.S. state of Alaska.

As per Federal Aviation Administration records, the airport had 3,282 passenger boardings (enplanements) in calendar year 2008, 3,226 enplanements in 2009, and 3,177 in 2010. It is included in the National Plan of Integrated Airport Systems for 2011–2015, which categorized it as a non-primary commercial service airport (between 2,500 and 10,000 enplanements per year).

== Facilities ==
Old Harbor Airport resides at elevation of 55 feet (17 m) above mean sea level. It has one runway designated 3/21 with a gravel surface measuring 2,750 by 60 feet (838 x 18 m).

== Airlines and destinations ==
Airlines with scheduled passenger service to non-stop destinations:

| Airlines | Destinations |
|---|---|
| Island Air Service | Akhiok, Kodiak |

=== Statistics ===
Carrier shares: January – December 2012
| Carrier | Passengers (arriving and departing) |
|---|---|
| Servant | 2,040(50.6%) |
| Island | 1,990(49.4%) |

Top domestic destinations: Jan. – Dec. 2012
| Rank | City | Airport | Passengers |
|---|---|---|---|
| 1 | Kodiak, AK | Kodiak Airport (ADQ) | 2,050 |
| 2 | Akhiok, AK | Akhiok Airport (AKK) | 40 |

== See also ==
- List of airports in Alaska
