= Uganik, Alaska =

Unincorporated community in the state of Alaska, United States

Uganik is a community in the Kodiak Island Borough of the U.S. state of Alaska. Other variations of the name that have been reported are Oohanick in 1805, Ooganok in the 1880 Census (population 73), and Uganak in the 1890 Census (population 31).

Uganik is located on the north coast of Kodiak Island, at the west shore of the northeast arm of Uganik Bay. Its coordinates are 57°46′N 153°24′W and its elevation is 0 feet (0 m).

The community is served by the San Juan (Uganik) Seaplane Base, which has scheduled passenger service subsidized by the U.S. Essential Air Service program.

Climate data for Uganik, Alaska
Month	Jan	Feb	Mar	Apr	May	Jun	Jul	Aug	Sep	Oct	Nov	Dec	Year
Record high °F (°C)	52 (11)	50 (10)	57 (14)	58 (14)	70 (21)	82 (28)	85 (29)	77 (25)	72 (22)	64 (18)	54 (12)	53 (12)	85 (29)
Mean daily maximum °F (°C)	35.7 (2.1)	36.9 (2.7)	39.0 (3.9)	44.0 (6.7)	52.8 (11.6)	60.9 (16.1)	64.4 (18.0)	64.6 (18.1)	56.9 (13.8)	47.5 (8.6)	40.2 (4.6)	33.8 (1.0)	48.1 (8.9)
Daily mean °F (°C)	30.0 (−1.1)	30.3 (−0.9)	32.0 (0.0)	36.7 (2.6)	44.2 (6.8)	51.6 (10.9)	55.8 (13.2)	56.5 (13.6)	49.7 (9.8)	40.4 (4.7)	34.1 (1.2)	27.9 (−2.3)	40.8 (4.9)
Mean daily minimum °F (°C)	24.2 (−4.3)	23.7 (−4.6)	25.0 (−3.9)	29.4 (−1.4)	35.6 (2.0)	42.3 (5.7)	47.2 (8.4)	48.3 (9.1)	42.5 (5.8)	33.2 (0.7)	27.9 (−2.3)	22.0 (−5.6)	33.4 (0.8)
Record low °F (°C)	3 (−16)	1 (−17)	3 (−16)	11 (−12)	21 (−6)	25 (−4)	36 (2)	34 (1)	27 (−3)	13 (−11)	1 (−17)	−3 (−19)	−3 (−19)
Average precipitation inches (mm)	4.09 (104)	3.02 (77)	2.94 (75)	3.31 (84)	2.75 (70)	1.76 (45)	2.12 (54)	1.81 (46)	3.81 (97)	6.42 (163)	5.94 (151)	4.61 (117)	42.58 (1,083)
Average snowfall inches (cm)	13.8 (35)	7.7 (20)	9.4 (24)	3.4 (8.6)	0.0 (0.0)	0.0 (0.0)	0.0 (0.0)	0.0 (0.0)	0.1 (0.25)	1.7 (4.3)	3.2 (8.1)	12.1 (31)	51.4 (131.25)
Source: WRCC
