= Karluk Airport =

Airport in Alaska, US

- IATA: KYK; ICAO: PAKY; FAA LID: KYK

Summary
- Airport type: Public
- Owner: State of Alaska DOT&PF - Central Region
- Serves: Karluk, Alaska
- Elevation AMSL: 137 ft (42 m)
- Coordinates: 57°33′58″N 154°27′14″W

Map
- Location of airport in Alaska

Runways
Direction	Length		Surface
Direction	ft	m	Surface
10/28	2,000	610	Gravel

Statistics (2006)
- Aircraft operations: 555
- Source: Federal Aviation Administration

Karluk Airport (IATA: KYK, ICAO: PAKY, FAA LID: KYK) is a state owned, public use airport located one nautical mile (2 km) east of the central business district of Karluk, a community in the Kodiak Island Borough of the U.S. state of Alaska.

As per Federal Aviation Administration records, the airport had 135 passenger boardings (enplanements) in 2020. This airport is included in the National Plan of Integrated Airport Systems for 2011–2015, which categorized it as a general aviation facility (the commercial service category requires at least 2,500 enplanements per year).

Scheduled passenger service was subsidized by the U.S. Department of Transportation via the Essential Air Service program until the end of March 2012, after which Island Air Service began providing subsidy-free service.

== Facilities and aircraft ==
Karluk Airport resides at elevation of 137 feet (42 m) above mean sea level. It has one runway designated 10/28 with a gravel surface measuring 2,000 by 60 feet (610 x 18 m). For the 12-month period ending December 31, 2006, the airport had 555 air taxi aircraft operations, an average of 46 per month.

== Airline and destinations ==
As of January 2026, the only airline with scheduled passenger service to non-stop destinations is Island Air Service, typically operating 3 flights per week on the Karluk-KYK to Kodiak-ADQ route. This route takes passengers from Karluk Airport to Kodiak Airport and takes about 1 hour. This is the sole route available for direct flights.

=== Statistics ===
Carrier shares: January 2012 – December 2012
Carrier	Passengers (arriving and departing)
Island	580(97.97%)
Servant	10(2.03%)

Top domestic destinations: Jan. – Dec. 2012
Rank	City	Airport	Passengers
1	Kodiak, AK	Kodiak Airport (ADQ)	250

== See also ==
- List of airports in Alaska

== Other sources ==
- Essential Air Service documents (Docket DOT-OST-2004-19342) from the U.S. Department of Transportation:
  - 90-Day Notice (October 5, 2004): of Redemption, Inc. d/b/a Island Air Service gives 90-days notice of its intent to terminate unsubsidized air service to Karluk, AK on or before January 4, 2005.
  - Order 2004-12-04 (December 2, 2004): prohibits Redemption, Inc., d/b/a Island Air Service from terminating its unsubsidized scheduled service at Karluk, Alaska; requires the carrier to continue providing essential air service (EAS) at the community for an initial 30-day period beyond the end of the 90-day notice period; and requests proposals for replacement essential air service.
  - Order 2005-3-30 (March 23 2005): selecting Servant Air, Inc. to provide essential air service to Karluk, Alaska, and, establishing a subsidy rate of $38,880 per year for service consisting of three trips each week, year-round, over a Kodiak-Karluk-Kodiak routing, with 5-seat Piper PA-32R-300 aircraft.
  - Order 2007-5-18 (May 31, 2007): selecting Redemption, Inc., d/b/a Island Air Service, to provide essential air service (EAS) at Alitak, Amook Bay, Kitoi Bay, Moser Bay, Olga Bay, Port Bailey, Port Williams, Seal Bay, Uganik, West Point, Zachar Bay, Alaska (Kodiak 11), at subsidy rates of $152,534 annually, and at Karluk, Alaska, for $29,481 annually, through June 30, 2009.
  - Order 2010-6-13 (June 9, 2010): selects Redemption Inc., d/b/a Island Air Service, to provide subsidized essential air service (EAS) at Karluk, Alaska, from April 1, 2010, through March 31, 2012, to be provided with five-seat Piper PA-32 aircraft, for an annual subsidy rate of $44,349.
  - Order 2012-3-13 (March 23, 2012): relying on Redemption, Inc., d/b/a Island Air Service, to provide subsidy-free Essential Air Service (EAS) at Karluk, Alaska, and terminating the carrier-selection case effective immediately.
