= Larsen Bay Airport =

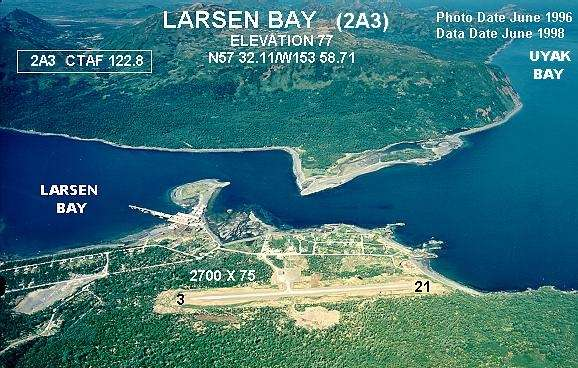
- IATA: KLN; ICAO: PALB; FAA LID: 2A3

Summary
- Airport type: Public
- Owner: State of Alaska DOT&PF - Central Region
- Serves: Larsen Bay, Alaska
- Elevation AMSL: 87 ft / 27 m
- Coordinates: 57°32′06″N 153°58′36″W

Map
- Location of airport in Alaska

Runways
Direction	Length		Surface
Direction	ft	m	Surface
4/22	2,690	820	Gravel

Statistics (2022)
- Aircraft operations: 3,426
- Source: Federal Aviation Administration

Larsen Bay Airport (IATA: KLN, ICAO: PALB, FAA LID: 2A3) is a state-owned public-use airport located in Larsen Bay, a city in the Kodiak Island Borough of the U.S. state of Alaska.

As per Federal Aviation Administration records, the airport had 2,336 passenger enplanements in calendar year 2021. It is included in the National Plan of Integrated Airport Systems for 2011–2015, which categorized it as a general aviation airport (A public airport that does not have scheduled service or has scheduled service with less than 2,500 passenger boardings each year).

== Facilities and aircraft ==
Larsen Bay Airport resides at elevation of 87 feet (27 m) above mean sea level. It has one runway designated 4/22 with a gravel surface measuring 2,690 by 75 feet (820 x 23 m). For the 12-month period ending December 31, 2021, the airport had 3,730 aircraft operations, an average of 10 per day: 52% air taxi and 48% general aviation.

=== Airport Operations ===
Airport use:	Open to the public
Control tower:	no
ARTCC:	ANCHORAGE CENTER
FSS:	KENAI FLIGHT SERVICE STATION [907-283-7211]
NOTAMs facility:	ENA (NOTAM-D service available)
Attendance:	UNATNDD
Wind indicator:	yes
Segmented circle:	yes
Lights:	ACTVT MIRL RY 04/22 - CTAF.
Beacon:	white-green (lighted land airport) ACTVT ROTG BCN - CTAF.

=== Runway Information ===
==== Runway 4/22 ====
Dimensions:	2690 x 75 ft. / 820 x 23 m	
Surface:	gravel, in good condition SLOPES DOWN TOWARD MIDPOINT.	
Runway edge lights:	medium intensity	
Runway edge markings:	RYS 04 & 22 THLD MKD WITH LIGHTS. PLASTIC REFLECTORS, AND THLD PANELS.	
	RUNWAY 4	RUNWAY 22
Latitude:	57-31.982852N	57-32.226197N
Longitude:	153-58.943418W	153-58.258150W
Elevation:	86.7 ft.	72.3 ft.
Traffic pattern:	left	left
Touchdown point:	yes, no lights	yes, no lights
Obstructions:	7 ft. brush, 60 ft. left and right of centerline, 1:1 slope to clear	10 ft. brush, 70 ft. left and right of centerline

== Airline and destinations ==
Airlines with scheduled passenger service to non-stop destinations:

Airlines	Destinations
Island Air Service	Karluk, Kodiak

=== Statistics ===
Carrier Shares for March 2023 - February 2024
Carrier	Passengers (arriving and departing)
Island	4,323(100%)

Top domestic destinations: April 2022 - March 2022
Rank	City	Airport	Passengers
1	Kodiak, AK	Kodiak Airport (ADQ)	2.09 thousand

== See also ==
- List of airports in Alaska
