= Servant Air =

Commuter airline based out of Kodiak, Alaska

IATA	ICAO	Call sign
-	-	SERVANT
- Founded: 1992; 34 years ago
- Ceased operations: 2021; 5 years ago
- Hubs: Kodiak Airport
- Destinations: 18
- Headquarters: Kodiak, Alaska, USA
- Key people: Eoghan Joyce (CEO)
- Website: www.servantair.com

Servant Air, Inc. was an American regional airline with operations in Alaska, USA. It operated domestic scheduled passenger from its hub at Kodiak Airport (PADQ). Servant Air also provided critical care Air Ambulance services throughout its operating area.

== History ==
The airline was established as Paklook Air in the spring of 1992 in Fairbanks, Alaska and began service with single engine commuter aircraft. Originally, the airline fleet consisted of a Cessna 185 Floatplanes, Cessna 206 and Cessna 207, Piper Lance, and Britten Norman Islander wheel aircraft. The fleet consisted of King Air 200's and King Air 100's operating scheduled and charter service to multiple villages on Kodiak Island and the Southcentral and Southeast regions of Alaska.

== Hubs ==
The Servant Air hub was located at Kodiak State Airport in Kodiak, Alaska. Facilities at the Kodiak hub included a terminal, a heavy maintenance facility, and a hangar.

== Fleet ==
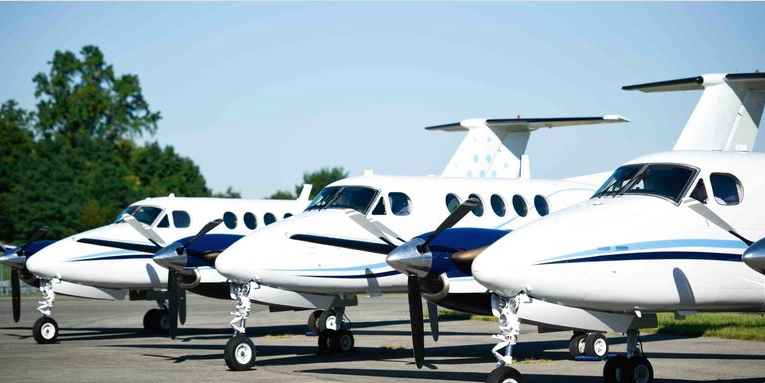
Servant Air fleet in Beacon Livery

The Servant Air fleet included Cessna 207, Cessna 208 Caravan, Cessna 208B Grand Caravan, Cessna Grand Caravan EX Amphibian, King Air B200, and King Air 100 aircraft.

== Destinations ==
Servant Air offered scheduled passenger service to the following destinations in Alaska:

- Akhiok (AKK) - Akhiok Airport
- Kodiak (ADQ) - Kodiak Airport (hub)
- Old Harbor (OLH) - Old Harbor Airport
- Ouzinkie (KOZ) - Ouzinkie Airport
- Port Lions (ORI) - Port Lions Airport

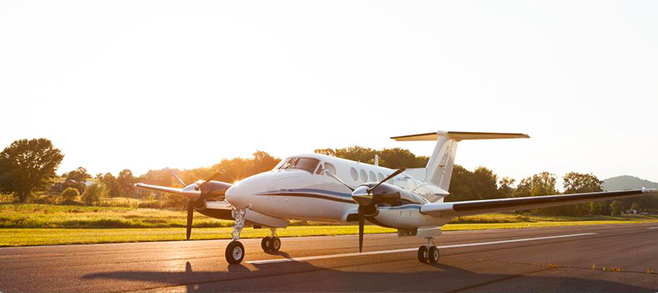
Servant Air King Air 200

Servant Air also offered unscheduled on-demand passenger service in Alaska to:

- Anchorage (ANC) - Ted Stevens Anchorage International Airport
- Fairbanks (FAI) - Fairbanks International Airport
- Juneau (JNU) - Juneau International Airport
- Kenai (ENI) - Kenai Airport
- Karluk (KYK) - Karluk Airport
- Homer (HOM) - Homer Airport
- King Salmon (AKN) - King Salmon Airport
- Unalaska (DUT) - Dutch Harbor Airport
- Larsen Bay (KLN) - Larsen Bay Airport

== Incidents ==
- On January 5, 2008, Servant Air Flight 109 crashed just short of Kodiak Airport shortly after takeoff, en route to Homer, Alaska. Of the 9 passengers and the pilot aboard the Piper Navajo Chieftain, there were 4 survivors. According to the NTSB, the failure of the nose baggage door latching mechanism resulted in an inadvertent opening of the nose baggage door in flight. Contributing to the accident was the lack of information and guidance available to the operator and pilot regarding procedures to follow should a baggage door open in flight and cause an inadvertent aerodynamic stall.
