= Kodiak Airport =

Airport in Alaska

Kodiak Benny Benson State Airport
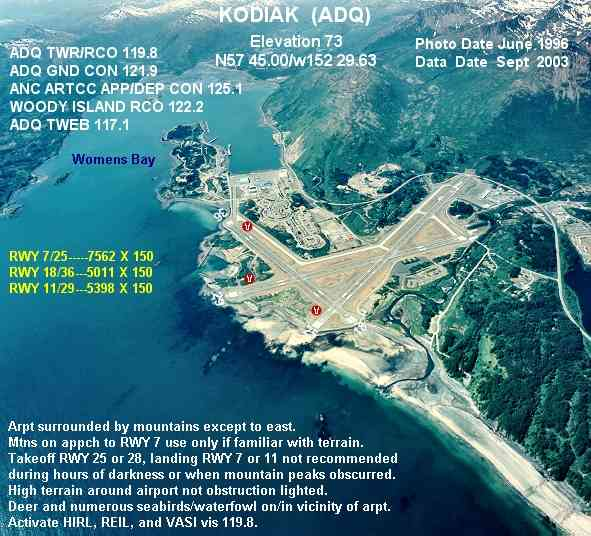
- IATA: ADQ; ICAO: PADQ; FAA LID: ADQ

Summary
- Airport type: Public / military
- Owner: State of Alaska DOT&PF - Central Region
- Serves: Kodiak, Alaska
- Hub for: Servant Air
- Elevation AMSL: 80 ft (24 m)
- Coordinates: 57°44′59″N 152°29′38″W

Maps
- FAA airport diagram

- Location of airport in Alaska

Runways
Direction	Length		Surface
Direction	ft	m	Surface
08/26	7,533	2,296	Asphalt
11/29	5,400	1,646	Asphalt
01/19	5,010	1,527	Asphalt

Statistics (2009)
- Aircraft operations: 40,949
- Based aircraft: 55
- Source: Federal Aviation Administration

Kodiak Benny Benson State Airport (IATA: ADQ, ICAO: PADQ, FAA LID: ADQ) is a public and military use airport located four nautical miles (5 mi, 7 km) southwest of the central business district of Kodiak, a city on Kodiak Island in the U.S. state of Alaska. The airport is state-owned and operated by the Alaska Department of Transportation & Public Facilities (DOT&PF). It is home to the co-located Coast Guard Air Station Kodiak and a hub for Servant Air. On April 11, 2013, the Alaska State Legislature passed SB31, which renamed the facility "Kodiak Benny Benson State Airport," in honor of the designer of the Alaskan flag.

This airport is included in the National Plan of Integrated Airport Systems for 2011–2015, which categorized it as a primary commercial service airport. As per Federal Aviation Administration records, the airport had 82,057 passenger boardings (enplanements) in calendar year 2008, 78,375 enplanements in 2009, and 80,303 in 2010.

== History ==
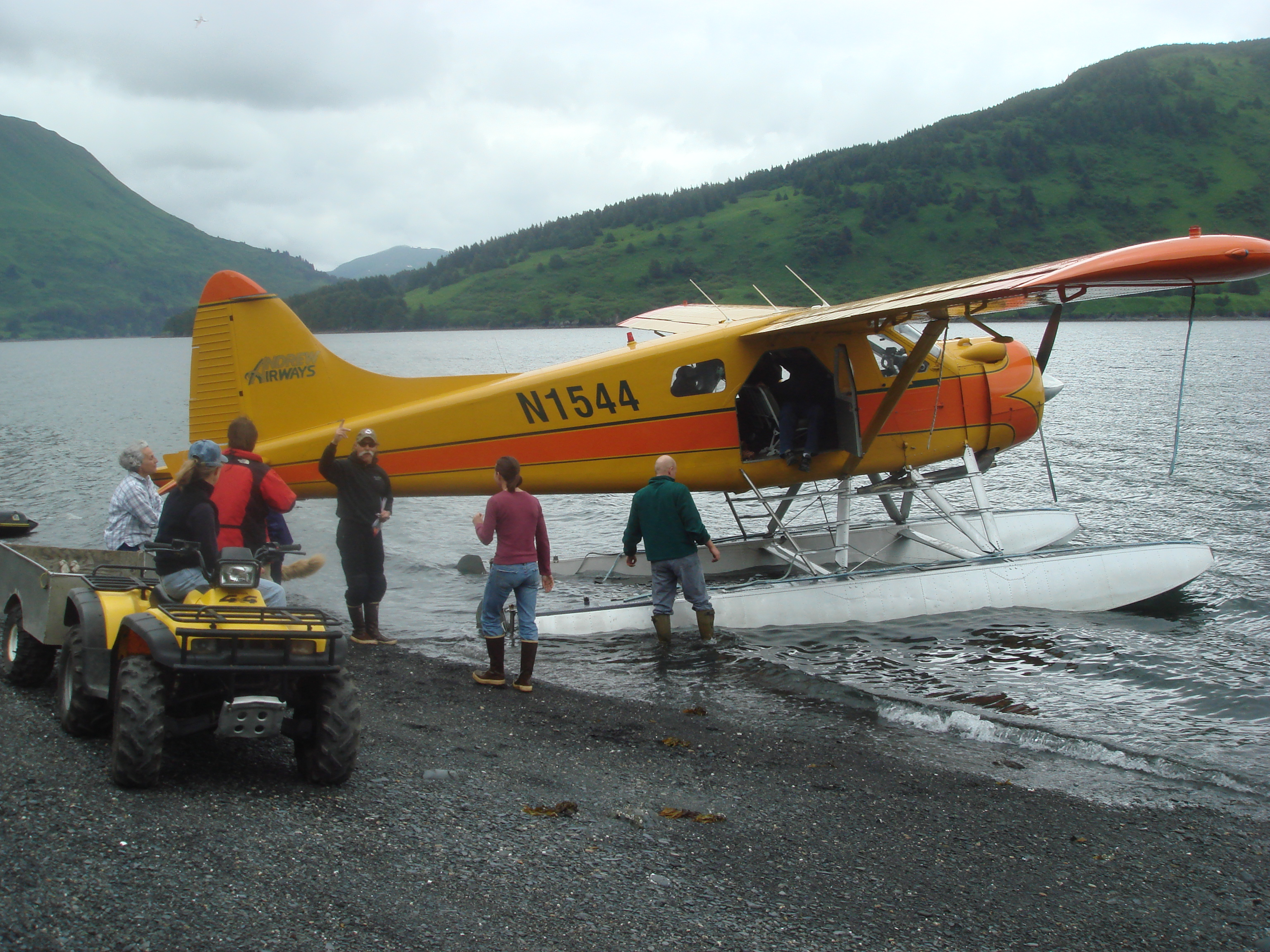
A de Havilland Beaver, part of the Andrew Airways fleet, dropping off tourists at a remote lodge on Raspberry Island

The airport is on the site of the former Naval Air Station Kodiak which was commissioned in 1941. NAS Kodiak was closed and placed in caretaker status in 1950, with the exception of runways and other facilities used by or conveyed to the U.S. Coast Guard.

In 1947, a Coast Guard Air Detachment was commissioned at NAS Kodiak, which was formally named Coast Guard Air Station Kodiak in 1964. In 1971, the U.S. Navy turned all airport runways and all remaining areas in caretaker status to the north over to the State of Alaska. CGAS Kodiak remains in operation at this location with four HC-130 Hercules, five HH-60J Jayhawk and five HH-65C Dolphin aircraft.

== Facilities and aircraft ==
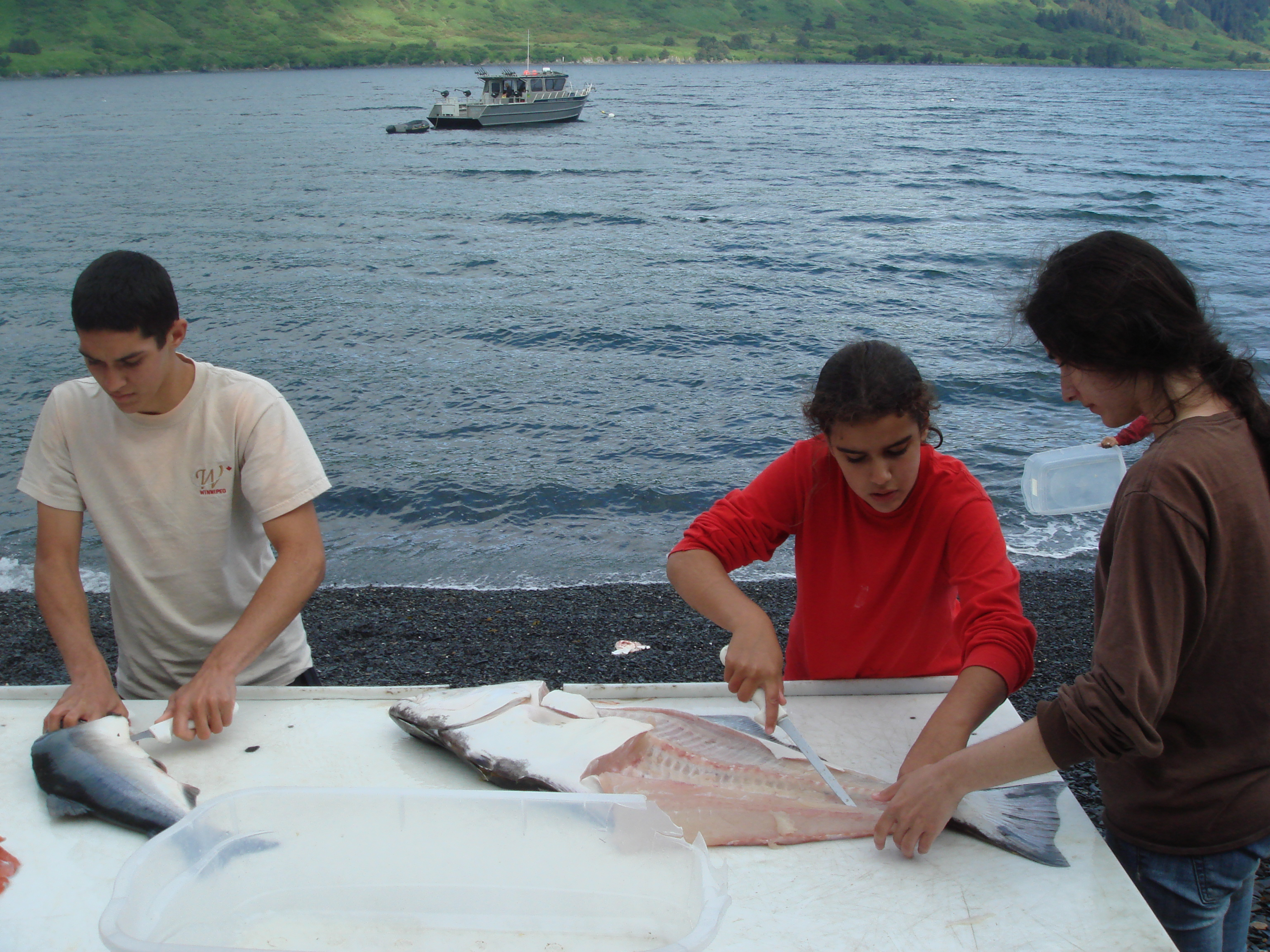
Teenage tourists filleting fish at a lodge on Raspberry Island. The fish is immediately vacuum packed and frozen, then put into coolers and checked on as baggage at Kodiak Airport upon departure. Almost all air travellers leaving Kodiak Airport have several coolers containing frozen fish they caught, and both Kodiak and Anchorage airports have freezers to keep these fish frozen in case of delay.

Kodiak Airport has three asphalt-paved runways: 7/25 measures 7,533 by 150 feet (2,296 x 46 m), 11/29 is 5,400 by 150 feet (1,646 x 46 m), and 18/36 is 5,010 by 150 feet (1,527 x 46 m).

For the 12-month period ending September 4, 2009, the airport had 40,949 aircraft operations, an average of 112 per day: 51% air taxi, 39% military, 6% scheduled commercial, and 4% general aviation. At that time there were 55 aircraft based at this airport: 45.5% single-engine, 14.5% multi-engine, 14.5% helicopter, and 25.5% military.

== Airlines and destinations ==
Airlines	Destinations
Alaska Airlines	Anchorage
Island Air Service	Port Lions

== Historical airline service ==
According to various editions of the North American Official Airline Guide (OAG) in the 1970s, 1980s and 1990s, Kodiak was previously served by several airlines that operated jet service into the airport. These air carriers included Western Airlines with Boeing 720B jetliner flights nonstop to Seattle as well as Alaska Airlines, MarkAir and Wien Air Alaska with all three carriers operating Boeing 737-200s nonstop to Anchorage (ANC) and AirPac flying British Aerospace BAe 146-100 jetliner service nonstop to ANC as well. Wien also operated Boeing 727-200 jets into the airport with direct, no change of plane 727 service from Reno (RNO), Portland, OR (PDX) and Seattle (SEA) in addition to nonstop 727 service from Anchorage (ANC). In addition, MarkAir served Kodiak with Boeing 737-400 jetliners and in 1994 was flying direct, no change of plane service with this aircraft type to Kodiak from the New York City area, Chicago, Denver and Seattle. MarkAir flight 401 departed New York Newark Airport (EWR) daily at 6:00 am, made intermediate stops at Chicago Midway Airport (MDW), Denver (DEN), Seattle (SEA) and Anchorage (ANC), and then arrived in Kodiak at 3:55 pm.

Kodiak also had nonstop service to Seattle in earlier years. From the late 1950s to the mid-1960s, Pacific Northern Airlines (PNA, the successor of Woodley Airways) operated Lockheed Constellation propliners nonstop to Seattle and also direct to Anchorage as well as via intermediate stops at Homer and Kenai. Pacific Northern was then acquired by and merged into Western Airlines which continued to operate nonstop service between Kodiak and Seattle, first with the former Pacific Northern Constellation aircraft during the late 1960s (with Western also flying the Constellation direct to Anchorage at this time via a stop in Homer or stops in Homer and Kenai) and then with Boeing 720B jetliners during the early 1970s. Western subsequently ceased all service into Kodiak. By the late 1970s, Wien Air Alaska was flying nonstop Boeing 737-200 jet service to Seattle. In 1994, Alaska Airlines was operating daily one-stop service to Kodiak from Seattle via Anchorage with a Boeing 737-400 jetliner with this flight also providing direct, no change of plane service from Phoenix (PHX) and Portland, OR (PDX). Alaska Airlines is currently the only air carrier operating jet service into the airport with Boeing 737-790, 737-890, and 737 MAX 8 aircraft. In summer 2022 and later, summer 2023, Horizon Air Embraer E175 service was planned, but was canceled before it started both times.

=== Statistics ===
Carrier shares (Dec. 2015 - Nov. 2016)
Carrier	Passengers (arriving and departing)
Era Aviation	67,000(42.98%)
Alaska	67,340(43.19%)
Horizon	11,060(7.09%)
Island Air Service	10,500(6.74%)

Top domestic destinations (Dec. 2015 - Nov. 2016)
Rank	City	Airport	Passengers
1	Anchorage, AK	Ted Stevens International (ANC)	72,270
2	Larsen Bay, AK	Larsen Bay (KLN)	2,040
3	Old Harbor, AK	Old Harbor (OLH)	950
4	Port Lions, AK	Port Lions (ORI)	650
4	Ouzinkie, AK	Ouzinkie (KOZ)	650
6	Kenai, AK	Kenai Municipal (ENA)	260
7	Karluk, AK	Karluk (KYK)	250
8	Akhiok, AK	Akhiok (AKK)	200
9	Homer, AK	Homer (HOM)	110

=== Charters and tours ===
Charters are generally available to the Kodiak archipelago and Katmai coast.

- Andrew Airways
- Island Air Service

== See also ==
- Integrated Support Command Kodiak
- List of airports in Alaska
