= Tatitlek Airport =

- IATA: TEK; ICAO: PAKA; FAA LID: 7KA

Summary
- Airport type: Public
- Owner: Alaska DOT&PF – Northern Region
- Serves: Tatitlek, Alaska
- Elevation AMSL: 62 ft / 19 m
- Coordinates: 60°52′21″N 146°41′28″W

Map
- Location of airport in Alaska

Runways
Direction	Length		Surface
Direction	ft	m	Surface
12/30	3,701	1,128	Gravel
13W/31W	8,000	2,438	Water

Statistics (2010)
- Aircraft operations: 2,350
- Source: Federal Aviation Administration

Tatitlek Airport (IATA: TEK, ICAO: PAKA, FAA LID: 7KA) is a state-owned public-use airport serving Tatitlek, in the Chugach Census Area of the U.S. state of Alaska. The National Plan of Integrated Airport Systems for 2011–2015 categorized it as a general aviation facility.

Scheduled passenger service at this airport is subsidized by the United States Department of Transportation via the Essential Air Service program.

== Facilities and aircraft ==
Tatitlek Airport covers an area of 160 acres (65 ha) at an elevation of 62 feet (19 m) above mean sea level. It has one runway designated 12/30 with a gravel surface measuring 3,701 by 75 feet (1,128 x 23 m). There is also a seaplane landing area designated 13W/31W which measures 8,000 by 4,000 feet (2,438 x 1,219 m). For the 12-month period ending December 31, 2010, the airport had 2,350 aircraft operations, an average of 45 per week: 53% air taxi and 47% general aviation.

== Airline and destinations ==
The following airline offers scheduled passenger service:

Airlines	Destinations
Alaska Air Transit	Anchorage–Merrill

Service to Anchorage was previously provided by Arctic Circle Air and Reeve Air Alaska.

=== Statistics ===
Carrier shares: January – December 2013
Carrier	Passengers (arriving and departing)
Reeve Air Alaska	70(100%)

Top domestic destinations: Jan. – Dec. 2013
Rank	City	Airport name & IATA code	Passengers	
Rank	City	Airport name & IATA code	2013	2012
1	Anchorage, AK	Lake Hood Strip (DQL)	40	40
2	Chenega, AK	Chenega Bay Airport (NCN)	<10	<10
3	Anchorage, AK	Anchorage International (ANC)	<10	<10

== See also ==
- List of airports in Alaska
