= PFCB =

PFCB may refer to:

- PFCB, the International Civil Aviation Organization airport code for Chenega Bay Airport, Alaska
- PFCB, the NASDAQ code for P. F. Chang's China Bistro, an American restaurant chain
- Punjab Film Censor Board, Pakistan
