= San Martin Airport =

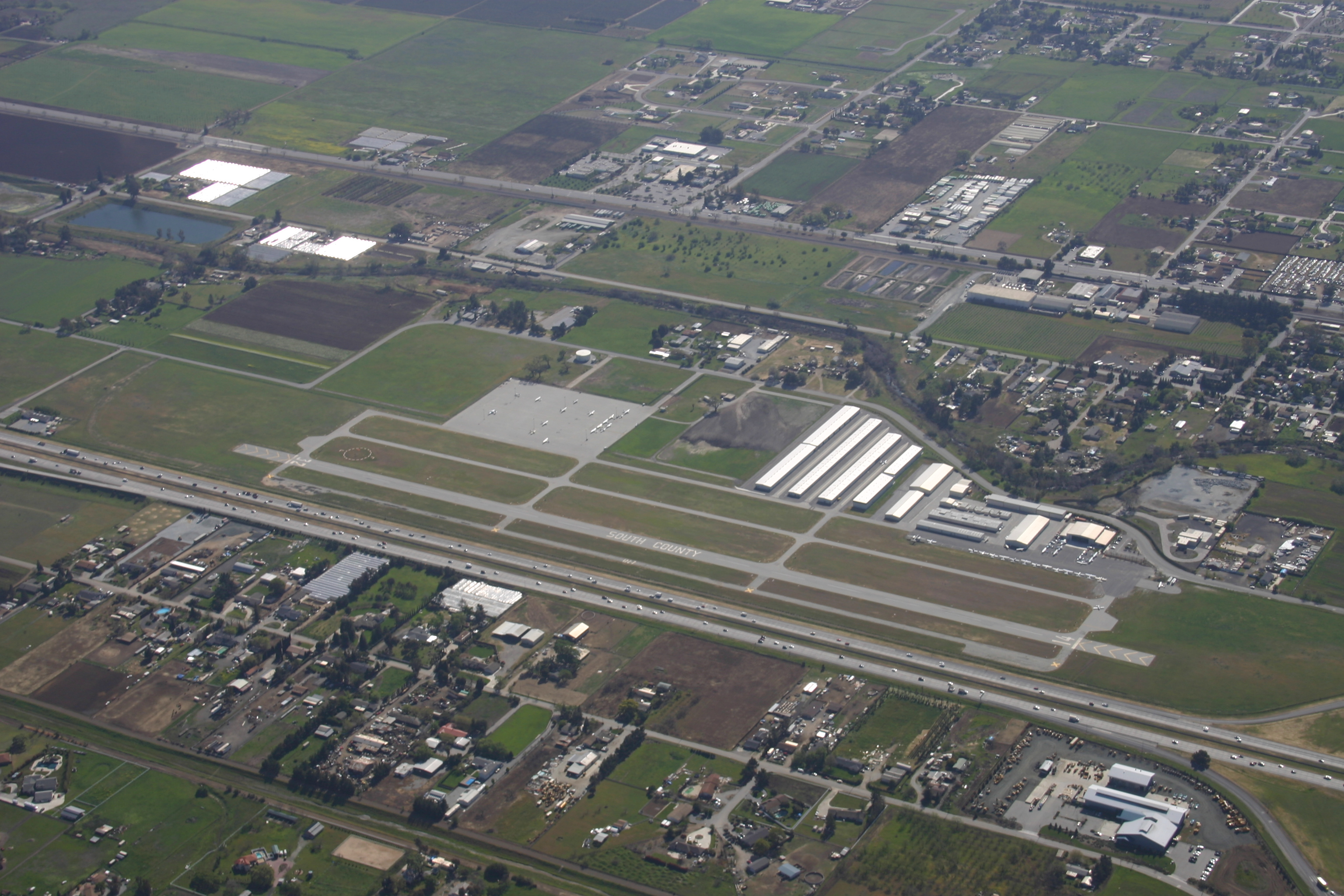
- Aerial view from northeast.
- IATA: none; ICAO: none; FAA LID: E16

Summary
- Airport type: Public
- Operator: County of Santa Clara
- Serves: San Francisco Bay Area
- Location: San Martin, California, U.S.
- Elevation AMSL: 281 ft / 85.6 m
- Coordinates: 37°04′54″N 121°35′48″W
- Interactive map of San Martin Airport

Runways
Direction	Length		Surface
Direction	ft	m	Surface
14/32	3,100	945	Asphalt

San Martin Airport (formerly South County Airport of Santa Clara County, colloquially South County Airport) (FAA LID: E16) — formerly Q99 — is a public non-towered airport located 1 mi (1.6 km) east of San Martin, serving Santa Clara County, California, United States. This general aviation airport covers 179 acres (72 ha) and has one runway. A self-service fueling facility offers 94UL aviation gasoline (not 100LL) continuously. Jet-A fuel is available from a full-service truck during FBO operating hours, and major airframe and powerplant service are available. San Martin Aviation is the fixed-base operator (FBO) at South County, serving aviation fuels and aircraft & hangar maintenance.

Although still distinctly visible from the air and shown on some maps, taxiway "F", adjacent to the U.S. Route 101 fence, has been abandoned and decommissioned since about 2000.

The Wings of History Air Museum is located adjacent to the airport.

== Instrument approaches and departures ==
San Martin Airport has one instrument approach procedure approved and published by the Federal Aviation Administration. The RNAV (GPS) RWY 32 approach is documented for normal and circling approaches using RNAV or GPS guidance with 1200' MDA and 1 1/4-mile visibility minimums. The RNAV (GPS) RWY 32 approach is not approved for use at night. The airport is equipped with pilot-controlled lighting.

There are no Standard Instrument Departure (SID) procedures published for the San Martin Airport.

Takeoff minimum visibility is standard at 1 mile for climb in instrument conditions, or alternately a ceiling of 1700 feet and 2.5 miles visibility for climb in visual conditions while operating under an instrument flight plan and clearance.

== Name change ==
In late 2013 County of Santa Clara staff recommended that the Santa Clara County Board of Supervisors rename South County Airport to "San Martin Airport". This recommendation was approved by the County Airports Commission on 1 October 2013 and referred to the Board of Supervisors for final approval. The board of supervisors subsequently unanimously approved the proposal on 28 January 2014, making its proposed name official.

== See also ==
- Palo Alto Airport
- Reid–Hillview Airport
- List of airports in the San Francisco Bay Area
