= WOHM =

WOHM may refer to:

- Wings of History Museum
- WOHM-LP, a low-power radio station (96.3 FM) licensed to serve Charleston, South Carolina, United States
