= NCN =

NCN may refer to:

== Media ==
- National Christian Network, a satellite TV network
- NCN Television, a Puerto Rican television station later broadcasting under the call sign WUJI
- New China News, a news agency of the People's Republic of China more commonly referred to as Xinhua
- New Country Network, a Canadian country music television station later renamed as CMT
- News Channel Nebraska, network of commercial radio and television stations in the U.S. state of Nebraska
- National Communications Network, Guyana, a state-owned Guyanese broadcasting company
- NCN Television (Guyana), a Guyanese television station

== Other ==
- Chenega Bay Airport (IATA: NCN), an airport in Chenega, Alaska
- Nathan Coulter-Nile, Australian cricketer
- National Caricaturist Network, a cartoonists' trade association
- National Cycle Network, a network of cycle routes in the United Kingdom
- The National Science Centre (Poland), a state-funded science funder in Poland (Narodowe Centrum Nauki)
- Nisichawayasihk Cree Nation, a Cree community location in and around Manitoba, Canada
