= KPAO =

KPAO may refer to:

- Palo Alto Airport (ICAO code KPAO)
- KPAO-LP, a defunct low-power television station (channel 22) formerly licensed to Paso Robles, California, United States
