= Russel Merrill =

American aviation pioneer (1894–1929)

Russel Hyde Merrill (April 8, 1894 – September 16, 1929) was an Alaskan aviation pioneer.

== Early life ==
Born on 8 April 1894 in Des Moines, Iowa, he attended Grinnell College for three years before transferring to Cornell. Before graduating though, he enlisted in the U.S. Navy on 11 May 1917. In the Naval Aviation Service during WWI, he became Naval Aviator No. 469 on 12 March 1918. He was then assigned to Cape May, New Jersey, where he became chief pilot. On 3 Dec. he retired from active duty, and completed his chemistry degree at Cornell on 1 Oct. 1919. After graduation he was hired by the engineering department of Crown Willamette Paper Company in Camas, Washington, but continued to fly in the Naval Reserve in San Diego. In 1921 he was made plant manager for Crown Willamette's facility in Floriston, California. After taking time off to be with his mother in Palo Alto, California, Russel moved to Portland, Oregon, and became general manager of Kern Clay Products and married Thyra Allen.

On 5 April 5 1925, Russel responded to an advertisement offering a flying boat for sale in Portland, a Curtiss Model F. This was the start of an aviation partnership based in Alaska between Russel, Roy Davis and Cyril Krugner. Departing Lake Washington on 19 May 1925, then landed at Ketchikan, Alaska, on 26 May. This was only the second nonmilitary flight up the Pacific Coast to Alaska, the first being made in 1922 by Roy F. Jones and Gerald J. Smith. Thus started the charter flights and barnstorming flying business of the Roy J. Davis Airplane Company.

== Flying in Alaska ==
Russel Merrill and Roy Davis flew from Juneau to Seward over the Gulf of Alaska 1-3 Aug. 1925, the first to do so since the First aerial circumnavigation of 1924. Then, on 20 Aug. 1925, Merrill and Davis became the first to fly an airplane to Anchorage. Then, at the end of August, Merrill and Davis flew Gus Gelles to Seldovia, Alaska, and then onwards to Kodiak, Alaska, the first time either town had seen an airplane. Yet, tragedy struck on 5 Sept. 1925, when the wind and tide destroyed the plane on the East Chugach Island beach they had made a forced landing the day before. In the summer of 1926, they purchased an Aeromarine 40B and flew it from Vancouver to Ketchikan, but the Merrill-Davis partnership ended in October. Russel had accepted the chief pilot position for Anchorage Air Transport, Inc., consisting of two planes, a Travel Air BW known as Anchorage No. 2 and a Travel Air CW, known as Anchorage No. 1.

On 8 Nov. 1927, Russel discovered a shorter path through the Alaska Range from Anchorage to the Kuskokwim River region. Previously, pilots had to use Rainy Pass, which took twice as long. The 3000 foot pass is now known as Merrill Pass. Also that same month, Anchorage Air Transport built the first airplane hangar at Anchorage. On 19 Aug. 1929, Anchorage Air Transport was sold and joined Wien Alaska Airways, and the Bennett-Rodebaugh Company in forming Alaskan Airways, Inc.

Russel had already made two flights on 16 Sept. 1929, when he took off on a third. This one carried a badly needed compressor for the New York-Alaska Company mine on Bear Creek at Nyac, near Bethel, Alaska. He was not seen again, though an extensive search started three days later. Eventually, a piece of airplane fabric was discovered on a Tyonek, Alaska, beach.

== Legacy ==
Anchorage Municipal Airport was renamed Merrill Field in the summer of 1930. An aerodrome beacon at the field became the Russel Hyde Merrill Memorial Beacon on 25 Sept. 1932. A bronze plaque dedicated at its base reads, "TO THAT DAUNTLESS PIONEER OF THE AIR RUSSEL HYDE MERRILL WHOSE LIFE'S AIM WAS THE DEVELOPMENT OF AVIATION IN ALASKA SEPTEMBER 16, 1929." The plaque now resides in the Merrill Field Airport Manager's Office.
