= San Martin, California =

Unincorporated community in California, United States

San Martin
- Census-designated place
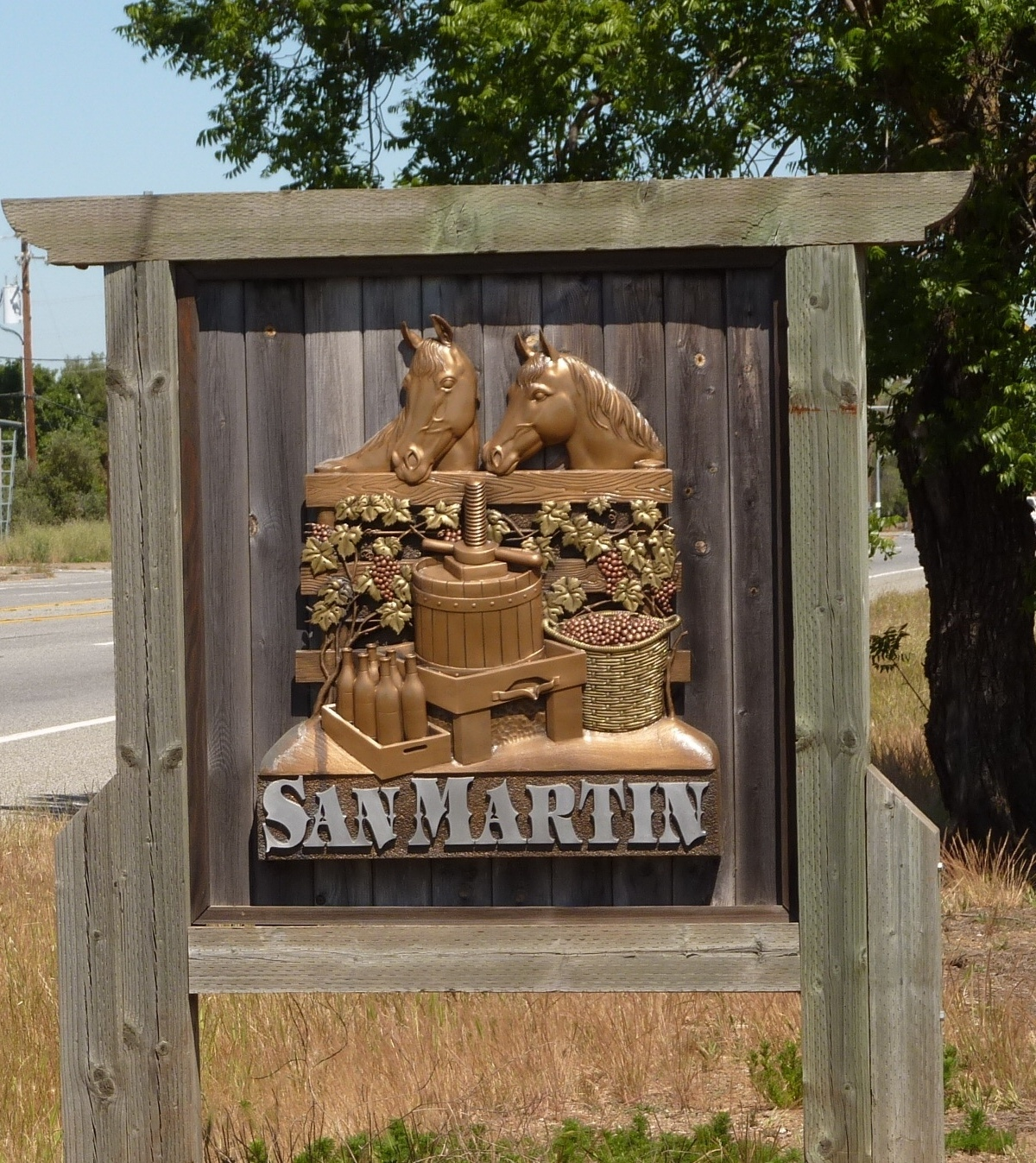
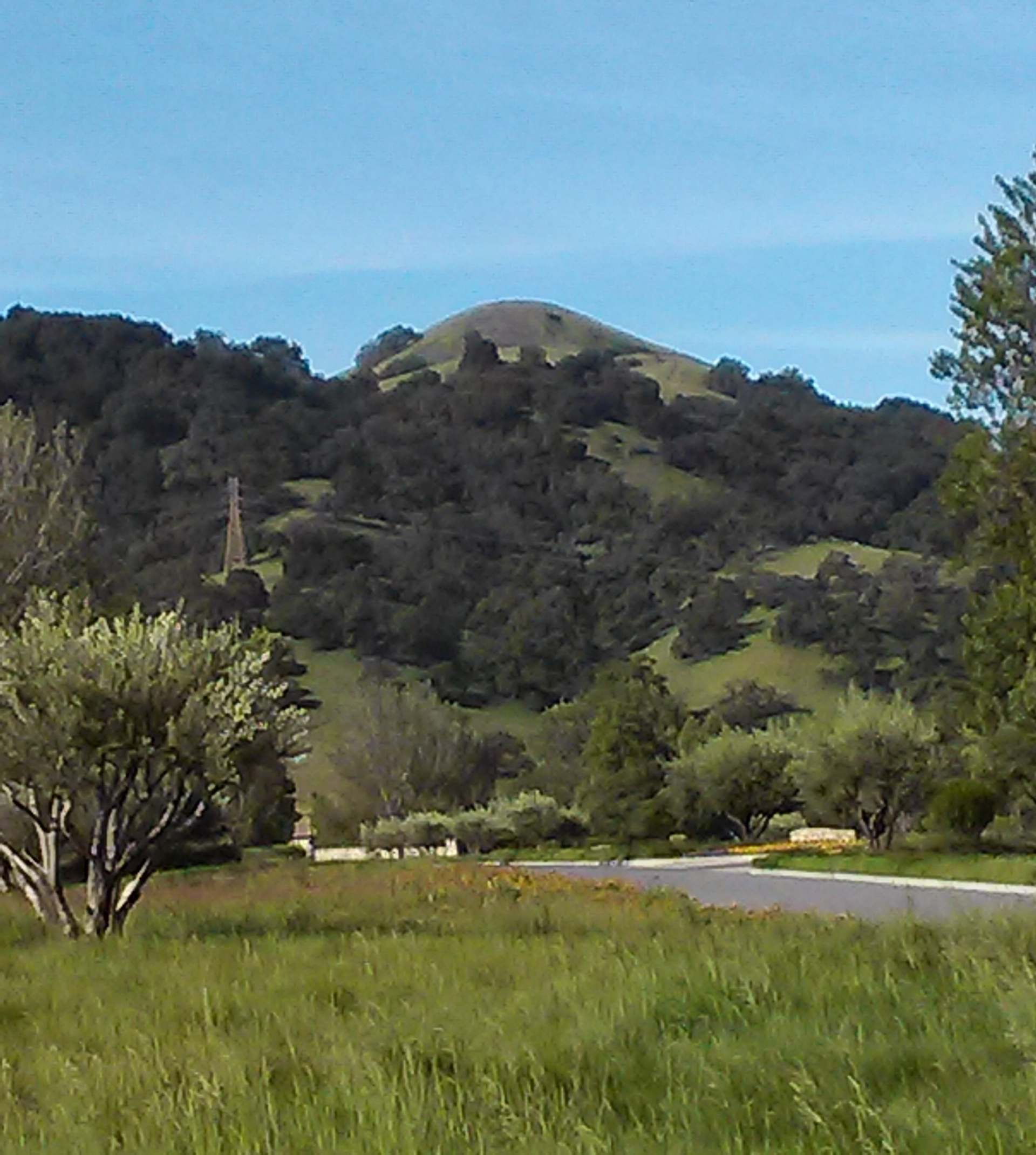
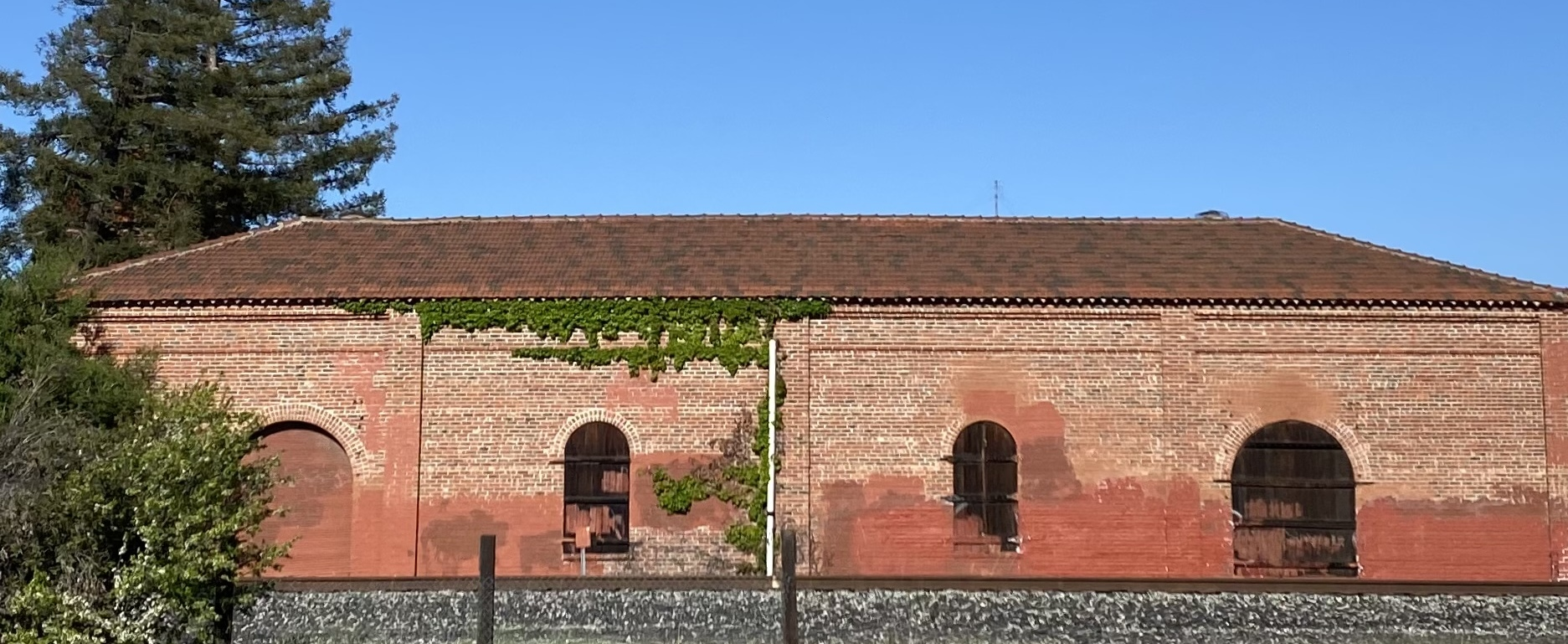
- Clockwise: Sign on Monterey Road; Lion's Peak; Old San Martin Winery.

- Location in Santa Clara County and the state of California

- Location in the United States
- Coordinates: 37°5′16″N 121°36′0″W
- Country: United States
- State: California
- County: Santa Clara
- Named for: St. Martin of Tours

Area
  - Total: 11.600 sq mi (30.044 km^{2})
  - Land: 11.600 sq mi (30.044 km^{2})
  - Water: 0 sq mi (0 km^{2}) 0%
- Elevation: 289 ft (88 m)

Population (2020)
  - Total: 7,008
  - Density: 604.1/sq mi (233.3/km^{2})
- Time zone: UTC-8 (Pacific)
  - Summer (DST): UTC-7 (PDT)
- ZIP code: 95046
- Area code: 408/669
- FIPS code: 06-68238
- GNIS feature ID: 277595

San Martin or San Martín (Spanish for Saint Martin) is a village and census-designated place (CDP) in Santa Clara County, California, United States, in the southern Santa Clara Valley. Located to the south of Morgan Hill and north of Gilroy, San Martin is characterized by ranches, wineries, and orchards, as well as large estates in the foothills of the Santa Cruz Mountains. As of the 2020 census, San Martin had a population of 7,008.

== History ==
San Martin was named after St. Martin of Tours, the patron saint of Santa Clara Valley by pioneer Martin Murphy Sr., an early settler and Mexican citizen who built the first Catholic church in the area.

The community has considered incorporating as a city since 2004, but concerns over the community's small size and its ability to pay for municipal services have held efforts back. Other options considered include annexation by Morgan Hill.

== Geography ==
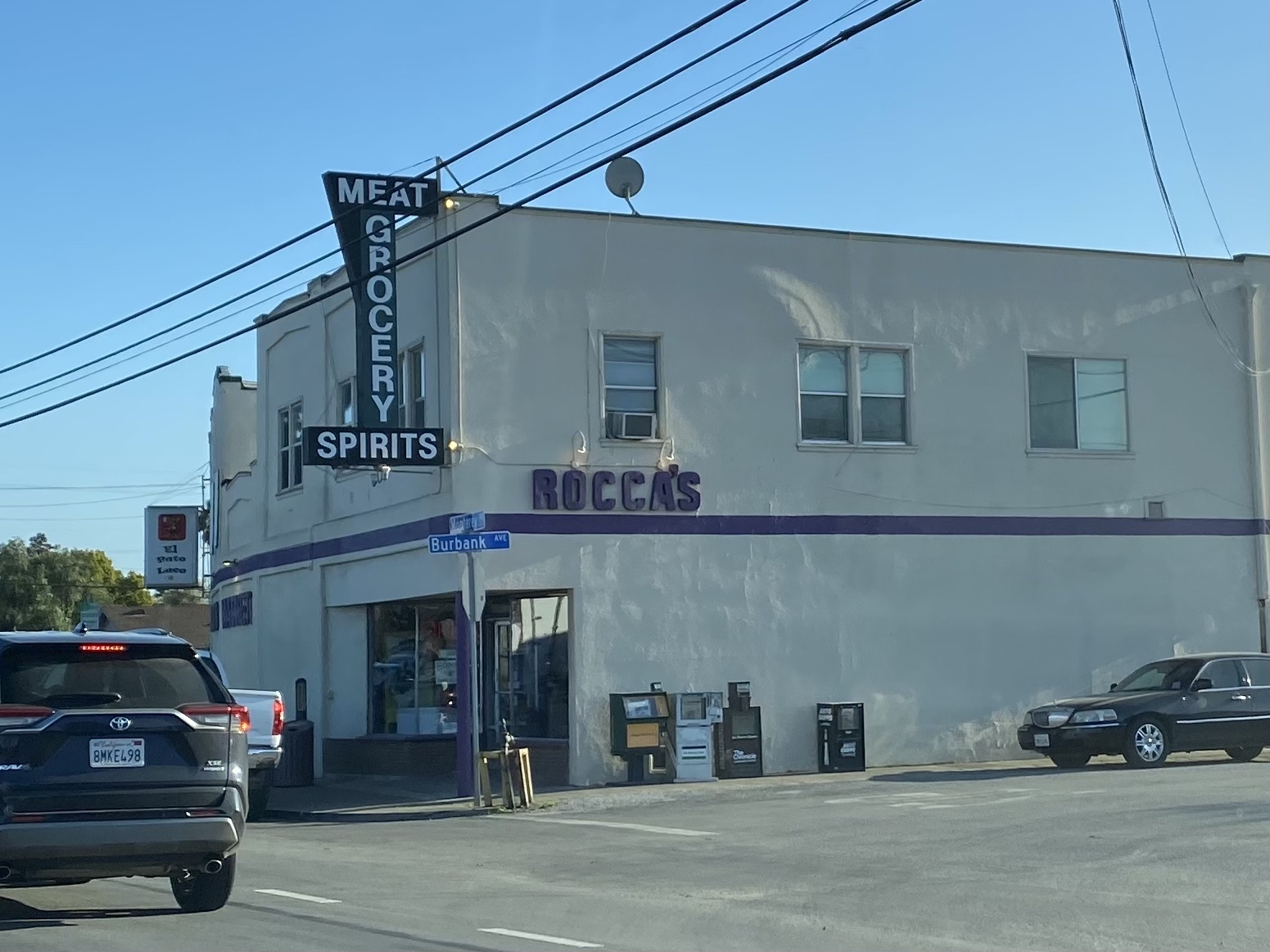
Rocca's Market in San Martin's village center.

San Martin is approximately 48 km (30 mi) south of San Jose, 11 km (6.8 mi) north of Gilroy, and 24 km (15 mi) inland from the Pacific Coast. Lying in a roughly 6 km-wide (4-mi-wide) southern extension of the Santa Clara Valley, it is bounded by the Santa Cruz Mountains to the west and the Diablo Range to the east.

According to the United States Census Bureau, the CDP has a total area of 11.6 square miles (30 km^{2}), all land.

=== Climate ===
Due to the moderating influence of the Pacific Ocean, San Martin enjoys a warm, Mediterranean climate. Temperatures range from an average midsummer maximum of 90.2°F (32.3°C) to an average midwinter low of 33.6 °F (0.9 °C). Average annual rainfall is 480 mm (18.9 in), and the summer months are typically dry. Snowfall is rare, about once every 20 years, and is light and short-lived when it occurs. Summer months are characterized by coastal fog which arrives from the ocean around 10 p.m. and dissipates the next morning by 10 a.m. Winter months have many sunny and partly cloudy days, with frequent breaks between rainstorms. The local terrain is inconducive to tornadoes, severe windstorms and thunderstorms. The local climate supports chaparral and grassland biomes, with stands of live oak at higher elevations.

== Demographics ==
Historical population
Census	Pop.	Note	%±
1960	1,162		—
1970	1,392		19.8%
1980	1,731		24.4%
1990	1,713		−1.0%
2000	4,230		146.9%
2010	7,027		66.1%
2020	7,008		−0.3%
U.S. Decennial Census; 1960 1970 1980; 1990 2000 2010

=== 2020 census ===
As of the 2020 census, San Martin had a population of 7,008. The population density was 604.1 inhabitants per square mile (233.2/km^{2}). The median age was 43.2 years. 20.7% of residents were under the age of 18 and 18.9% were 65 years of age or older. For every 100 females, there were 110.6 males, and for every 100 females age 18 and over there were 112.8 males.

The census reported that 97.3% of the population lived in households, 2.4% lived in non-institutionalized group quarters, and 0.4% were institutionalized. 88.5% of residents lived in urban areas, while 11.5% lived in rural areas.

There were 1,980 households, of which 32.5% had children under the age of 18 living in them. Of all households, 61.1% were married-couple households, 5.0% were cohabiting couple households, 18.1% were households with a male householder and no spouse or partner present, and 15.8% were households with a female householder and no spouse or partner present. About 15.6% of households were made up of individuals, and 7.7% had someone living alone who was 65 years of age or older. The average household size was 3.44. There were 1,553 families (78.4% of all households).

There were 2,092 housing units, of which 5.4% were vacant. Of the occupied units, 71.8% were owner-occupied and 28.2% were occupied by renters. The homeowner vacancy rate was 0.3% and the rental vacancy rate was 3.3%.

Racial composition as of the 2020 census
Race	Number	Percent
White	3,238	46.2%
Black or African American	43	0.6%
American Indian and Alaska Native	201	2.9%
Asian	456	6.5%
Native Hawaiian and Other Pacific Islander	20	0.3%
Some other race	1,861	26.6%
Two or more races	1,189	17.0%
Hispanic or Latino (of any race)	3,361	48.0%

=== Income and poverty ===
In 2023, the US Census Bureau estimated that the median household income was $156,292, and the per capita income was $60,388. About 1.9% of families and 6.5% of the population were below the poverty line.

=== 2010 census ===
The 2010 United States census reported that San Martin had a population of 7,027. The population density was 606.0 inhabitants per square mile (234.0/km^{2}). The racial makeup of San Martin was 4,329 (61.6%) White, 27 (0.4%) African American, 71 (1.0%) Native American, 470 (6.7%) Asian, 18 (0.3%) Pacific Islander, 1,752 (24.9%) from other races, and 360 (5.1%) from two or more races. Hispanic or Latino of any race were 3,249 persons (46.2%).

The Census reported that 6,896 people (98.1% of the population) lived in households, 114 (1.6%) lived in non-institutionalized group quarters, and 17 (0.2%) were institutionalized.

There were 1,993 households, out of which 812 (40.7%) had children under the age of 18 living in them, 1,267 (63.6%) were opposite-sex married couples living together, 199 (10.0%) had a female householder with no husband present, 124 (6.2%) had a male householder with no wife present. There were 131 (6.6%) unmarried opposite-sex partnerships, and 14 (0.7%) same-sex married couples or partnerships. 279 households (14.0%) were made up of individuals, and 98 (4.9%) had someone living alone who was 65 years of age or older. The average household size was 3.46. There were 1,590 families (79.8% of all households); the average family size was 3.70.

The population was spread out, with 1,780 people (25.3%) under the age of 18, 713 people (10.1%) aged 18 to 24, 1,613 people (23.0%) aged 25 to 44, 2,098 people (29.9%) aged 45 to 64, and 823 people (11.7%) who were 65 years of age or older. The median age was 38.5 years. For every 100 females, there were 103.9 males. For every 100 females age 18 and over, there were 106.9 males.

There were 2,122 housing units at an average density of 183.0 per square mile (70.7/km^{2}), of which 1,309 (65.7%) were owner-occupied, and 684 (34.3%) were occupied by renters. The homeowner vacancy rate was 1.9%; the rental vacancy rate was 1.7%. 4,491 people (63.9% of the population) lived in owner-occupied housing units and 2,405 people (34.2%) lived in rental housing units.

According to Forbes Magazine, San Martin is rated as one of the country's most expensive ZIP codes with a median home price of $824,390 in 2010, despite a drop in home value of almost 20% from 2008.

== Economy ==
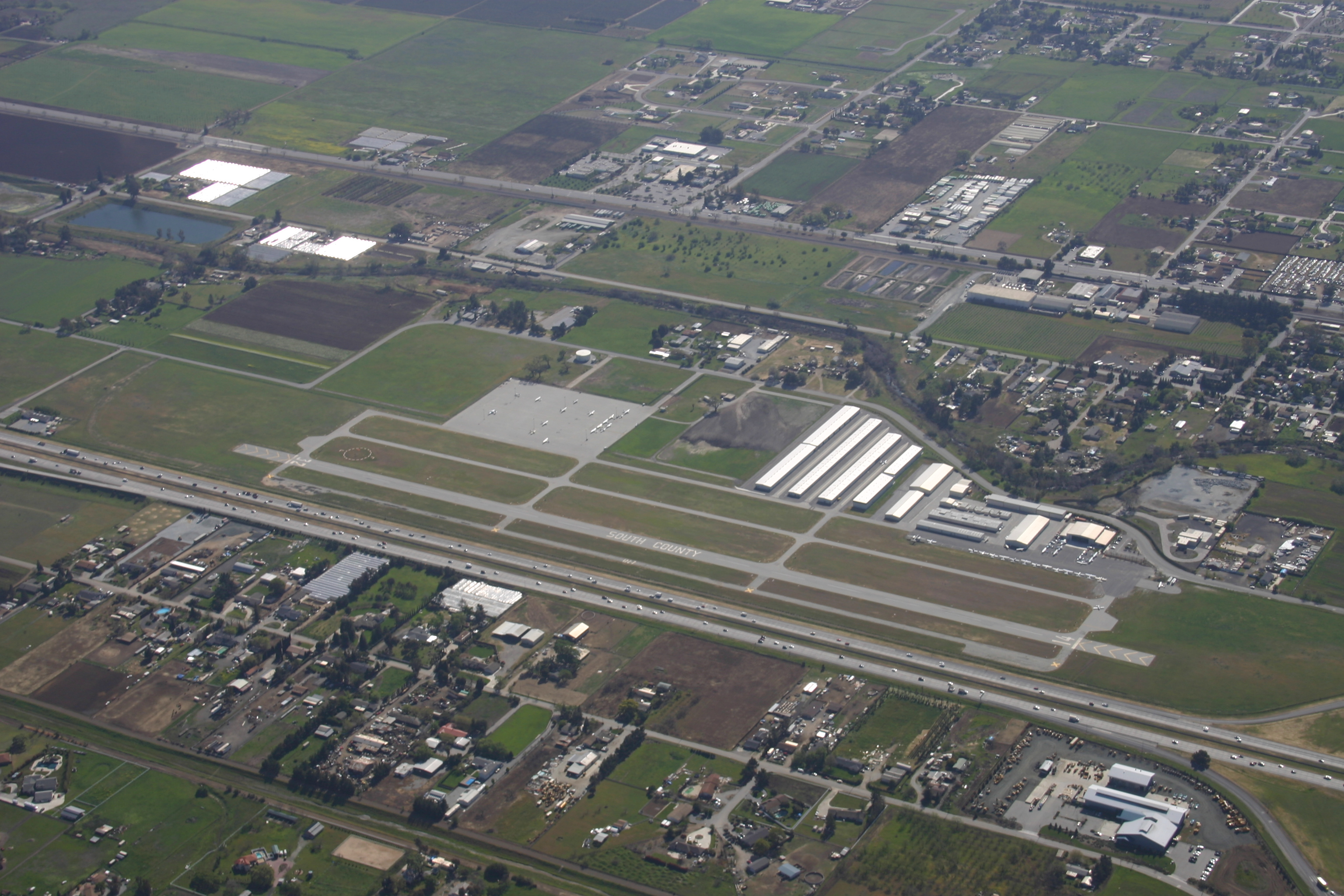
San Martin Airport

San Martin is a large producer of garlic, table mushrooms, and wine. The Wings of History Museum, an aviation museum, is located next to San Martin Airport.

== Government ==
In the California State Legislature, San Martin is in the 15th senatorial district, represented by Democrat Dave Cortese, and in the 29th Assembly district, represented by Democrat Robert Rivas.

In the United States House of Representatives, San Martin is in California's 18th congressional district, represented by Democrat Zoe Lofgren.

== Infrastructure ==
=== Transportation ===
San Martin is adjacent to a freeway, U.S. Route 101, and is the location of an uncontrolled airport, San Martin Airport (E16), operated by Santa Clara County. Public transportation needs are provided by Santa Clara Valley Transportation Authority (VTA) buses and a commuter rail station served by Caltrain.
