= Wings of History Museum =

Coordinates: 37.07875°N 121.60086°W

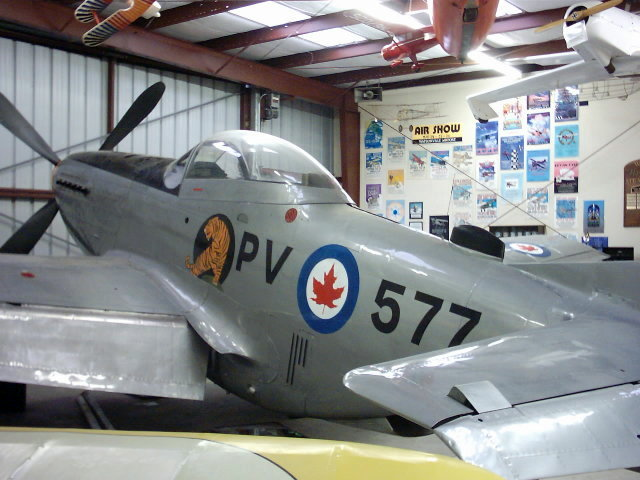
P-51D Mustang PV 577 at Wings of History

Wings of History is an aviation museum in San Martin, California. It is a nonprofit organization that operates using donations and membership dues.

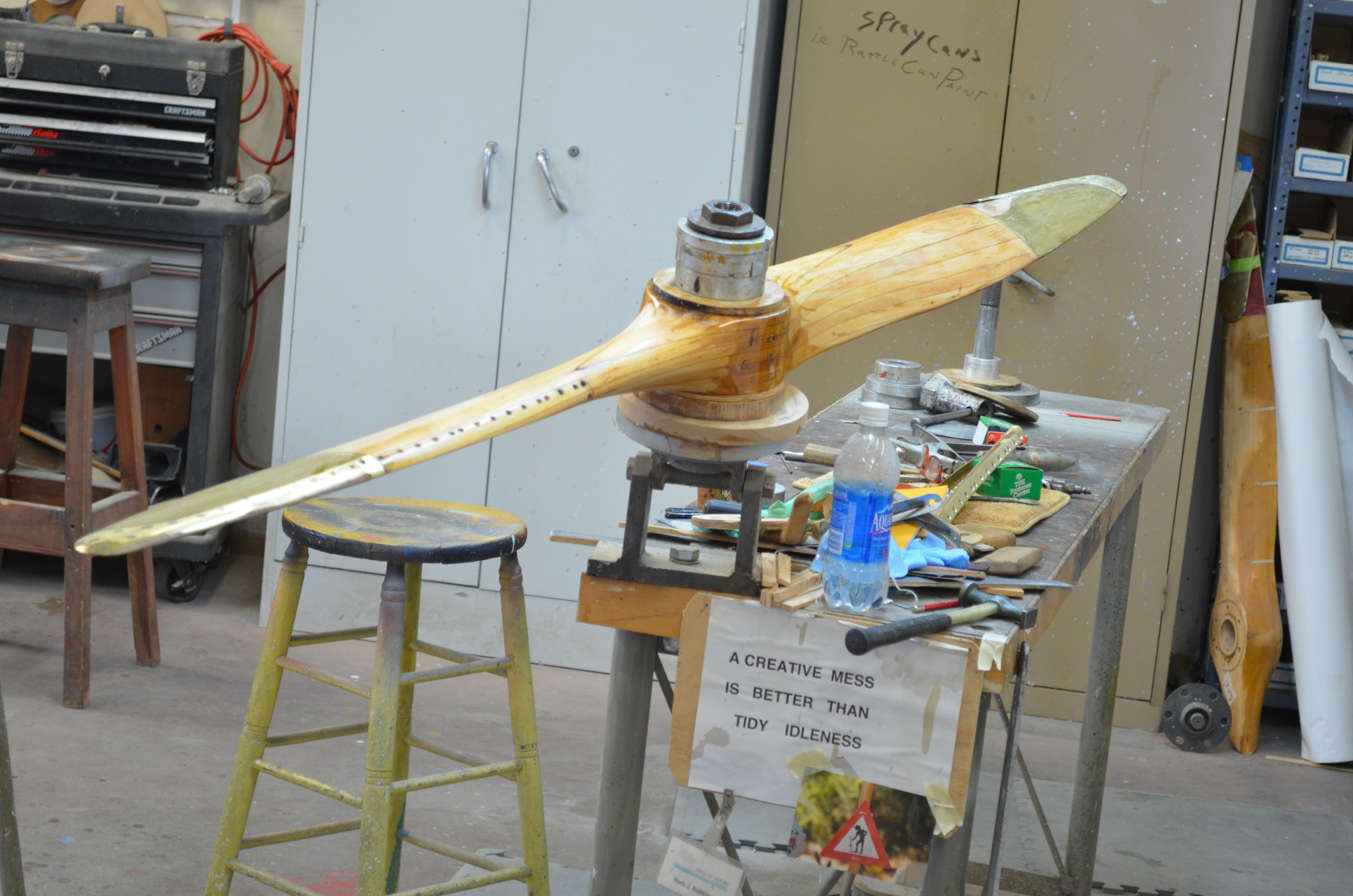
A wooden propeller being made in the prop shop.

The museum also has a restoration shop, library, and propeller shop.

== Hangars ==
The Wings of History museum has two large hangars filled with aircraft and instrument parts.

=== Hangar 1 ===
Hangar 1 consists mainly of antique aircraft parts, like engines, and a full-size, complete albeit non-flying replica of the Wright Brothers' original Wright Flyer. This hangar also has many models and other highly detailed aircraft engines including

- 95 horsepower British Cirrus engines, flown by such planes as the Westland IV, the Fairchild 22, and the Miles Hawk
- 65 horsepower Continental, A-65, 4-cylinders, horizontally opposed
- 220 horsepower Continental, R-670-4, 7 cylinders
- Kiekhaefer, Model V-105-2
- McCullock, Model 4310-A
- Nelson, Model H-44
- Salmson, Model 9-AD
- Pratt and Whitney, R-1830

=== Hangar 2 ===
Hangar 2 consists mainly of complete aircraft, and a car-helicopter that was donated. Near the exit there is a flight simulator and collection of radar and flight instruments.

== Outdoors ==
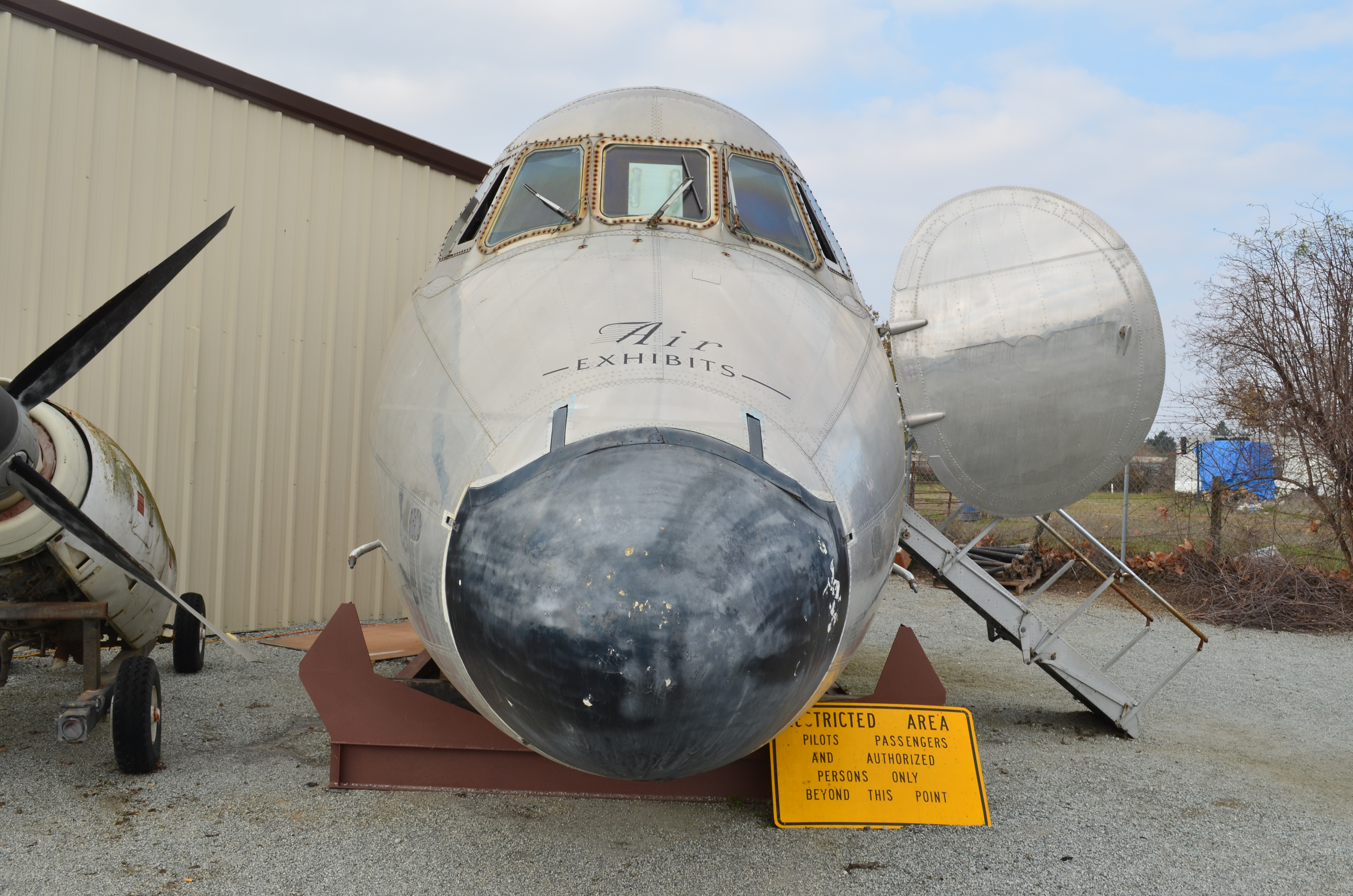
The nose and engine of the Vickers Viscount.

Outside the hangars, there is a 1938 American Eagle A-101, 1934 Aeronca C-3, 1934 Pietenpol Air Camper, 1940 Stinson Model 10]. Various experimental aircraft and the Vickers Viscount are also on display. Many of the restored or partially restored aircraft have working flight surfaces that are controllable through the cockpit.

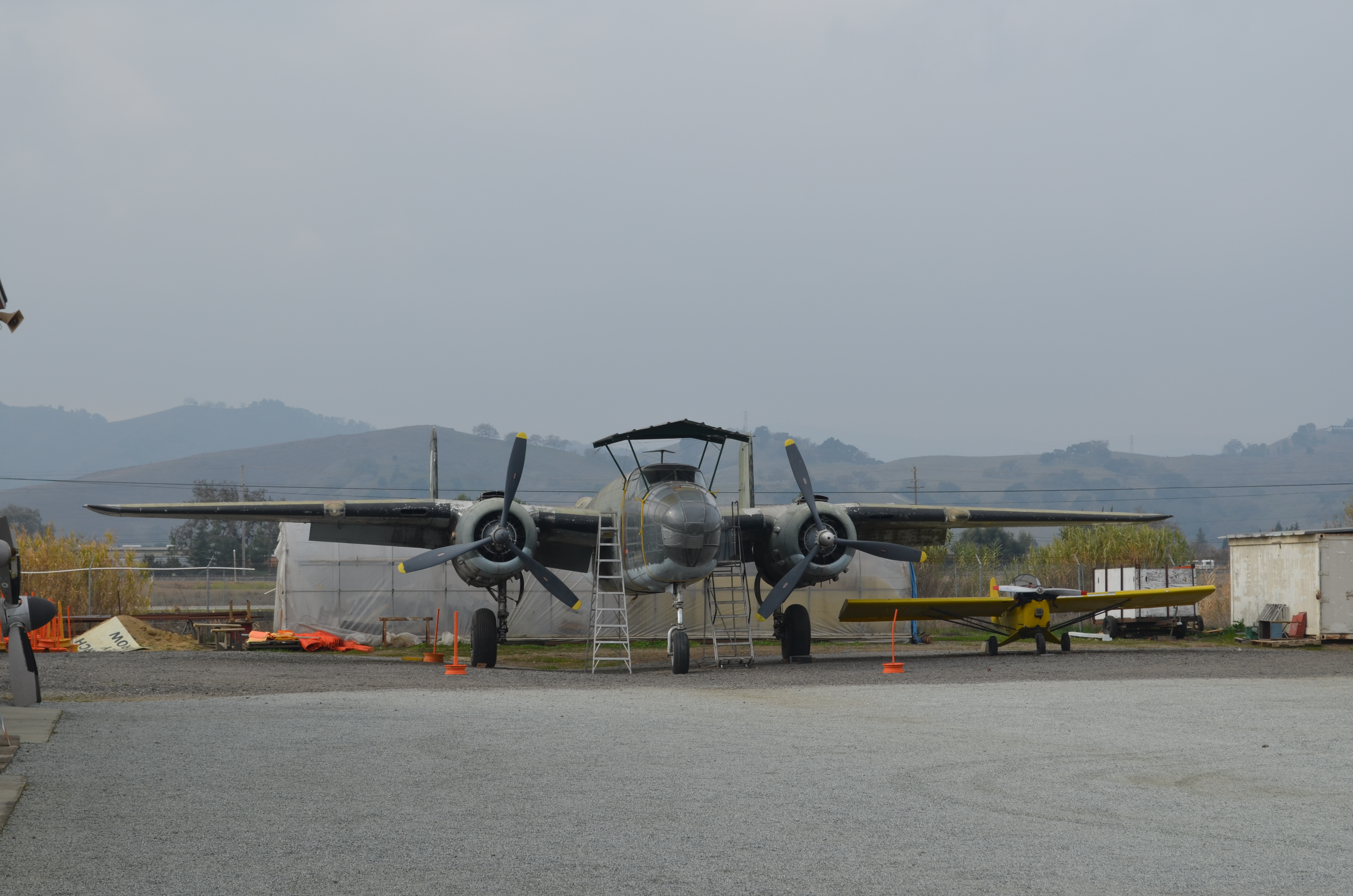
The B-25 sitting between Hangars 1 and 2
