= Palo Alto Airport =

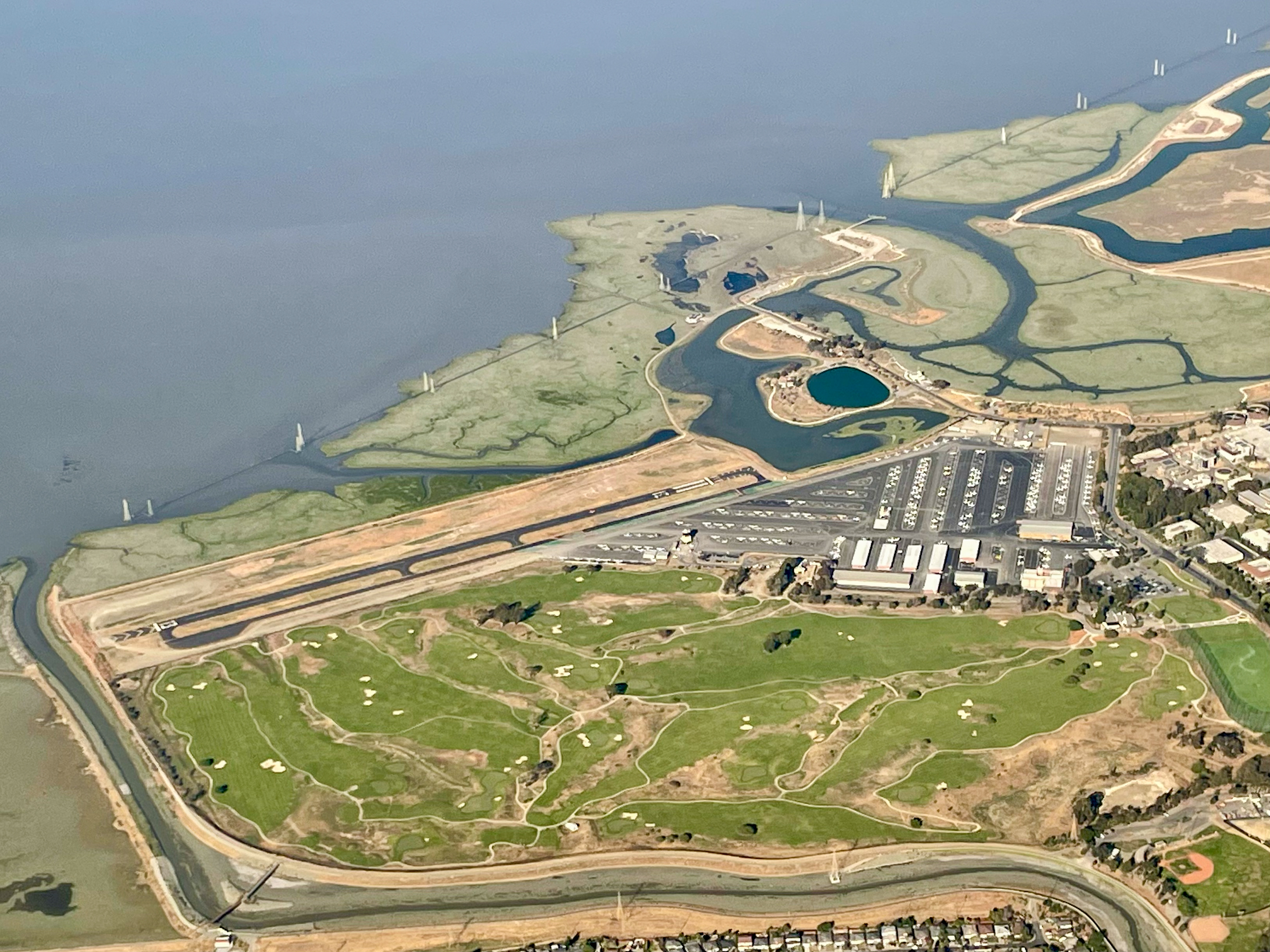
- Aerial view of Palo Alto Airport
- IATA: PAO; ICAO: KPAO; FAA LID: PAO

Summary
- Airport type: Public
- Operator: City of Palo Alto
- Serves: San Francisco Bay Area
- Location: Palo Alto, California, U.S.
- Elevation AMSL: 7 ft (2.1 m)
- Coordinates: 37°27′40″N 122°06′54″W
- Website: Official website

Runways
Direction	Length		Surface
Direction	ft	m	Surface
13/31	2,443	745	Asphalt

Statistics
- Runway 31: Runway in good condition; lights
- Runway 13: Runway in good condition; lights

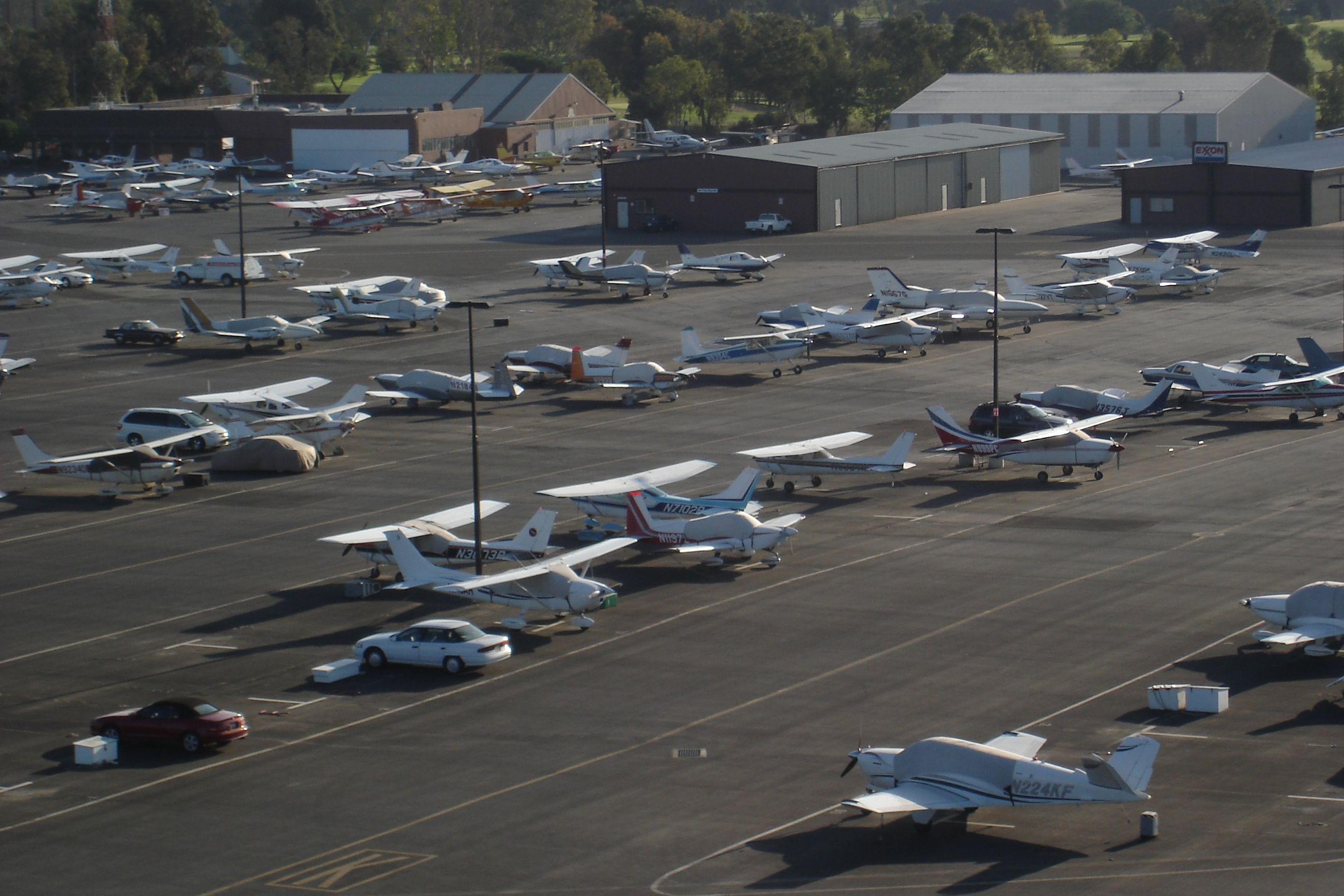
Bird's-eye view of the facilities

Palo Alto Airport (IATA: PAO, ICAO: KPAO, FAA LID: PAO) is a general aviation airport in the city of Palo Alto. Santa Clara County, California, near the south end of San Francisco Bay on the western shore.

== Facilities ==
Palo Alto Airport covers 102 acres (41 ha) and has one asphalt paved runway (13/31) measuring 2,443 × 70 ft. (745 × 21 m).

Facilities at this busy towered airport include a staffed terminal and multiple repair shops: Advantage Aviation (Cessna & Beechcraft Authorized Service Center), WVAS Inc. dba Aero Works (Diamond Authorized Service Center), Rossi Aircraft, and Peninsula Avionics. The airport is also home to a number of flying clubs (in order of establishment): Stanford Flying Club (est. 1930), West Valley Flying Club (est. 1973), Sundance Flying Club (est. 2006), and Advantage Aviation Flying Club. The airport is located within one-half mile of U.S. Route 101.

First-time pilots should familiarize themselves with the complex Bay Area airspace, especially the overlying SFO Class B and the abutting SJC Class C airspace. Landing pilots should also watch out for bird and jackrabbit activity.

Fifteen miles of hiking and biking trails, affording multiple opportunities for birdwatching, form part of the adjacent 1,940-acre (785 ha) Palo Alto Baylands Nature Preserve and Byxbee Park. The airport is also adjacent to a public golf course. Dining options within a short walk include Cloud9 Coffee and the Bay Café at the golf course.

== Instrument approaches ==
Palo Alto Airport has one approach to runway 31. The RNAV (GPS) approach to runway 31 has 460' MDA/1-mi visibility minimum for category A approaches. The VOR approach has been decommissioned.

- GPS Runway 31

== History ==
The original Palo Alto airport was located adjacent to Stanford Stadium and was built in the late 1920s. Between 1934 and 1936, a new Palo Alto Airport was built at the airport's current location.

In 1989 a comprehensive area history analysis was conducted by Earth Metrics, based upon review of extant aerial photographs. The photo reconnaissance flights were flown in 1956, 1960, 1973, 1974 and 1980 by the U.S. Department of the Interior, and are archived by the U.S. Geological Survey in Menlo Park, California. Comparison of the aerial photographs indicate that no development had begun in the vicinity prior to 1956 other than the Palo Alto Airport and the Regional Water Quality Control Board Plant (terminus of Embarcadero Way). Between 1956 and 1960, no new development had taken place in the area; however, by 1973, the Harvey Gum Factory was on the subject site and structures were either completed or under construction at 1890 Embarcadero Road and 2440-2450 Embarcadero Way. Conditions were identical in the 1974 aerial photograph. In the 1980 aerial photograph, the Harvey Gum Factory is standing, and additional infill construction can be seen in the area such as the Baylands Business Park adjacent and to south of the site and the structure now located at 1860 Embarcadero Road. The Harvey Gum Factory was demolished in 1982, based on Palo Alto Planning Department records.

In 2015 the City of Palo Alto took over operations from Santa Clara County, after a 50-year lease had ended.

== See also ==
- California World War II Army Airfields
- 35th Flying Training Wing (World War II)
- List of airports in the San Francisco Bay area
- List of attractions in Silicon Valley
- Reid-Hillview Airport
- San Martin Airport
