= Obstacle departure procedure =

Example of a published textual obstacle departure procedure

Example of a published graphic obstacle departure procedure

Obstacle departure procedure (ODP) is a type of departure procedure that provides obstruction clearance via the least onerous route from an airport to an appropriate en-route structure. Pilots can fly ODPs without prior clearance unless assigned a standard instrument departure or radar vectored by air traffic controllers.

== Print ==
ODPs may be designed using either conventional or area navigation (RNAV) criteria. ODPS can be either graphical or textual; graphical ODPs always note "(OBSTACLE)" in the title.

== Development ==
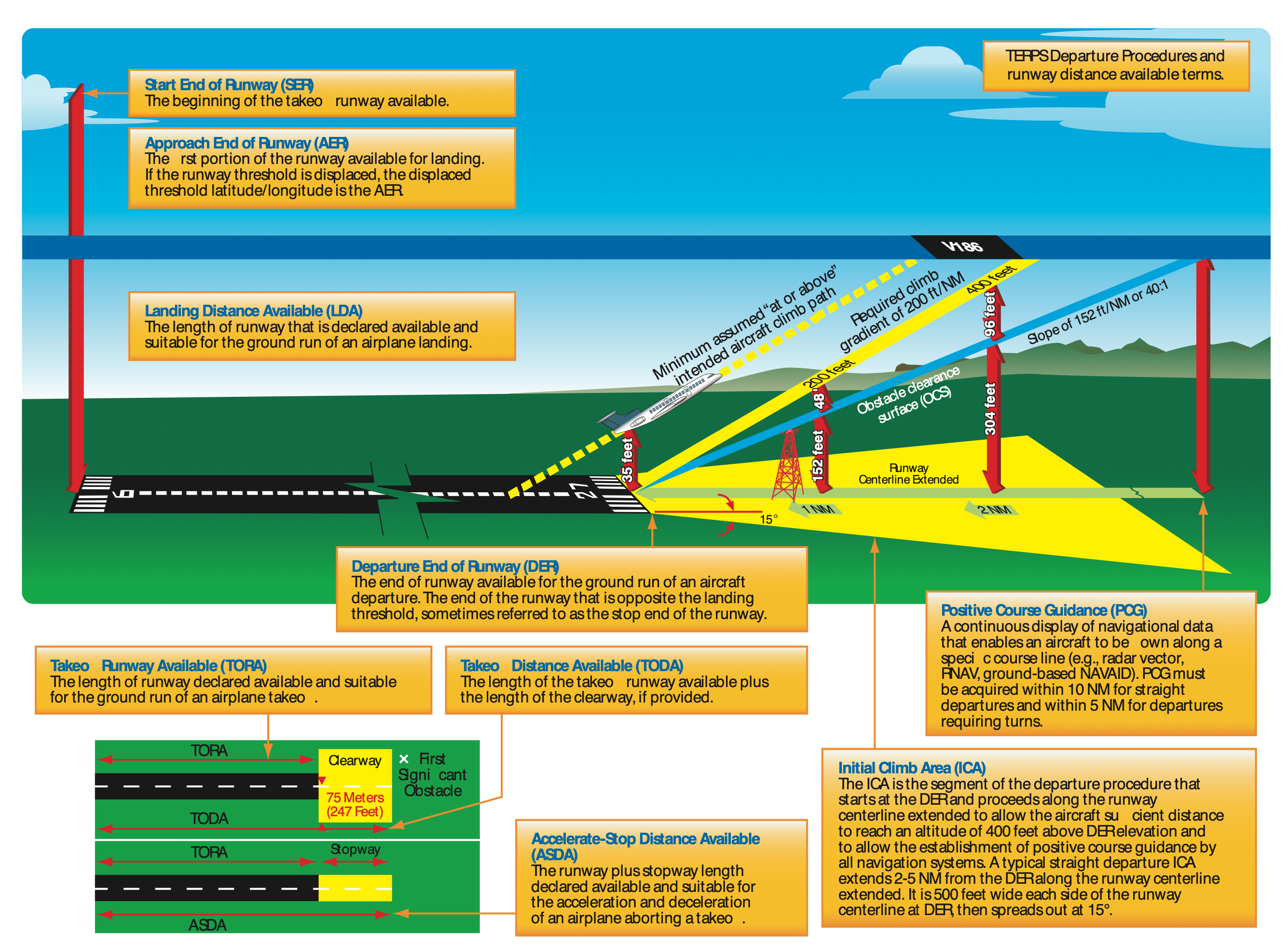
United States Standard for Terminal Instrument Procedures (TERPs)

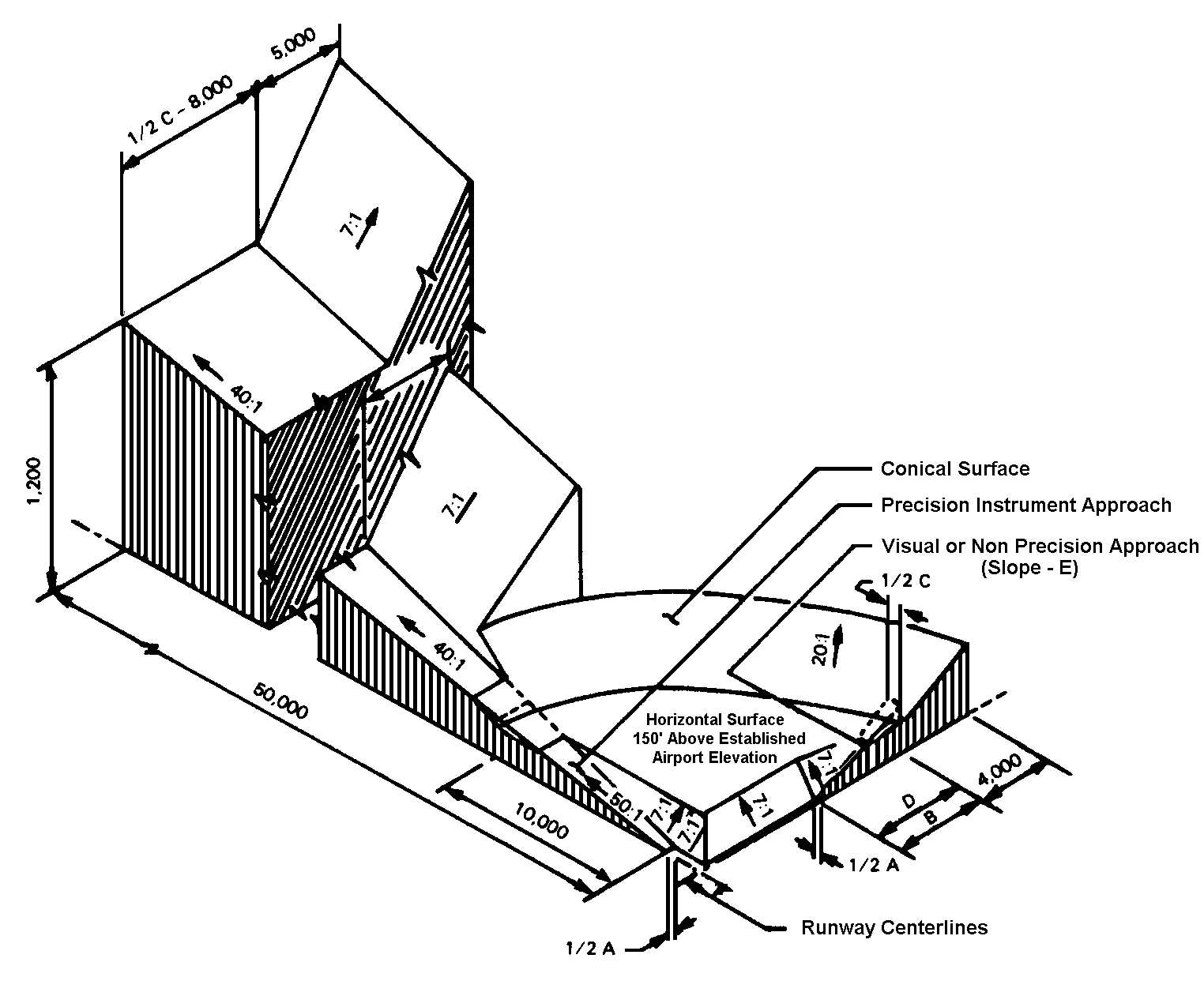
3D diagram of obstacle clearance surfaces around an airport

When an airport is being analyzed for designing an instrument approach procedure, an obstacle departure procedure assessment is conducted first. Pass the departure end of the runway, Surveyors establish an obstacle clearance surface (OCS) (Note: Also known as an obstacle identification surface (OIS).), which is an imaginary surface that rises at a 40:1 ratio under standard conditions, or 152ft per nautical miles. The OCS can rise more steeply if terrain or other obstacles are present. Pass the departure end of the runway at 35ft above ground, if an aircraft can maintain 48ft per nautical mile clearance above the OCS, a clearance requirement known as required obstacle clearance (ROC), or maintain a climb rate of 200ft per nautical mile for standard 40:1 ratio OCS, no ODP will be established. Otherwise, an ODP is included with the instrument procedure. Obstacles located within 1 nautical mile of the departure end of runway but penetrate the OCS are considered "low, close-in obstacles". To avoid publishing a steep climb gradient, these obstacles' locations and heights are noted in Terminal Procedures Publication.

Commonly, ODPs are developed under the assumption that the aircraft will:

- Cross the departure end at least 35 feet above runway departure end elevation;
- Climb to 400 feet above runway departure end elevation before turning;
- Maintain climb gradient > 200 ft per nautical mile until reaching minimum IFR altitude.

Unlike Standard Instrument Departures, ODPs are generally developed for smaller airports. It is also assumed that all aircraft engines are in normal operation during the climb, as opposed to being a safeguard for twin engine planes with one engine inoperative.
