= Lake Hood Seaplane Base =

Seaplane base in Anchorage, Alaska, US

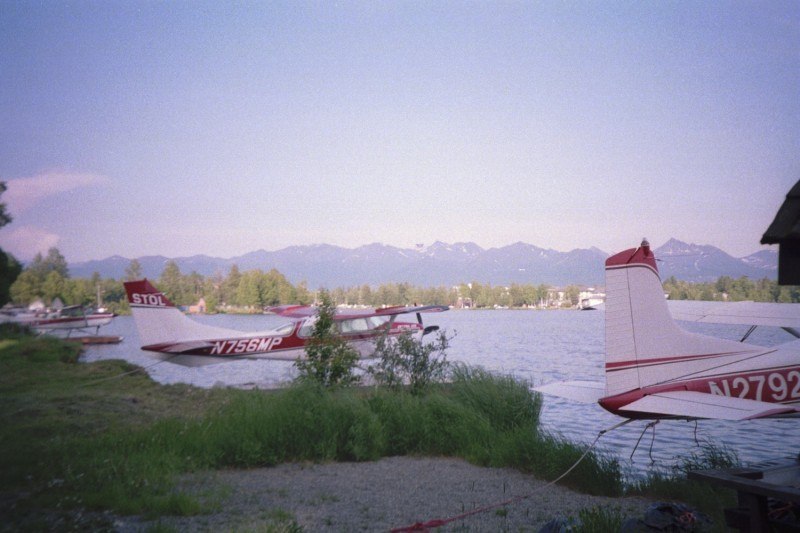
- Float planes at Lake Hood Seaplane Base
- IATA: none; ICAO: PALH; FAA LID: LHD

Summary
- Airport type: Public
- Owner: Alaska DOT&PF – Central Region
- Serves: Anchorage, Alaska
- Elevation AMSL: 71 ft (22 m)
- Coordinates: 61°10′54″N 149°57′59″W

Map
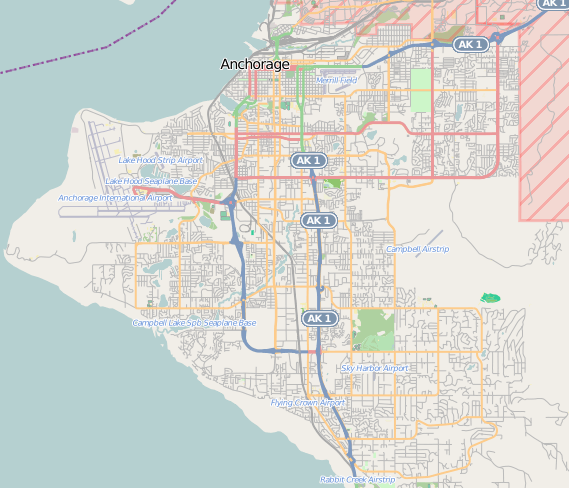
- Location within Anchorage Location within Alaska

Runways
Direction	Length		Surface
Direction	ft	m	Surface
14/32	2,200	671	Gravel/dirt
10W/28W	4,541	1,384	Water
02W/20W	1,930	588	Water
14W/32W	1,369	418	Water

Statistics (2015)
- Aircraft operations: 61,900
- Based aircraft: 1,032
- Passengers: 458
- Freight: 146,000 lbs
- Source: Federal Aviation Administration

Lake Hood Seaplane Base (ICAO: PALH, FAA LID: LHD) is a state-owned seaplane base located 3 nautical miles (5.6 km) southwest of the central business district of Anchorage in the U.S. state of Alaska. The Lake Hood Strip (ICAO: PALH, FAA LID: LHD) is a gravel runway located adjacent to the seaplane base. The gravel strip airport's previous code of (FAA LID: Z41) has been decommissioned and combined with (ICAO: PALH, FAA LID: LHD) as another landing surface.

Operating continuously and open to the public, Lake Hood is one of the world's busiest seaplane base, handling an average of 190 flights per day, 2nd in volume to the Vancouver, BC Harbour Aerodome (averaging 200-300 flights per day). It is located on Lakes Hood and Spenard (Niłkidal'iy in the indigenous Dena'ina language), next to Ted Stevens Anchorage International Airport three miles from downtown Anchorage. The base has an operating control tower, and during the winter months the frozen lake surface is maintained for ski-equipped airplanes.

Most U.S. airports use the same three-letter location identifier for the FAA and IATA; Lake Hood is assigned LHD by the FAA but has no designation from the IATA. The airport's ICAO identifier is PALH.

== Facilities and aircraft ==
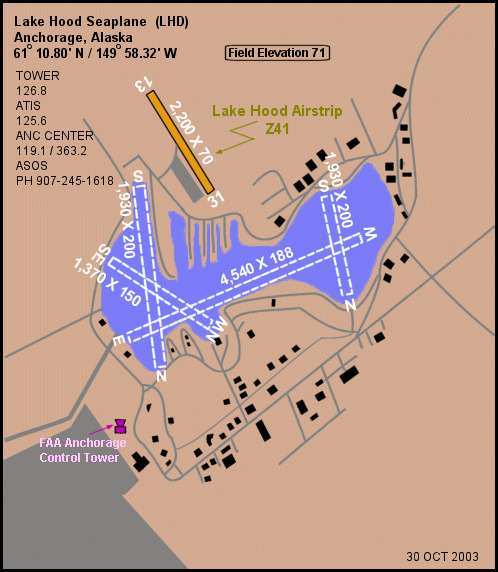
FAA Alaska airport diagram

Lake Hood Seaplane Base (PALH / LHD) diagram including waterlanes, parking areas and radio frequencies. Published in Supplement Alaska, 27 APR 2017.

Lake Hood Seaplane Base has three seaplane landing areas: E/W is 4,540 by 188 feet (1,384 x 57 m); N/S is 1,930 by 200 feet (588 x 61 m); NW/SE is 1,370 by 150 feet (418 x 46 m).

Aircraft landing on the gravel strip near Lake Hood

Lake Hood Strip has one runway designated 14/32 with a gravel surface measuring 2,200 by 75 feet (671 x 23 m).

For the 12-month period ending August 1, 2005, the seaplane base had 69,400 aircraft operations, an average of 190 per day: 88% general aviation, 12% air taxi and <1% military. There are 781 aircraft based at this seaplane base: 97% single engine and 3% multi-engine.

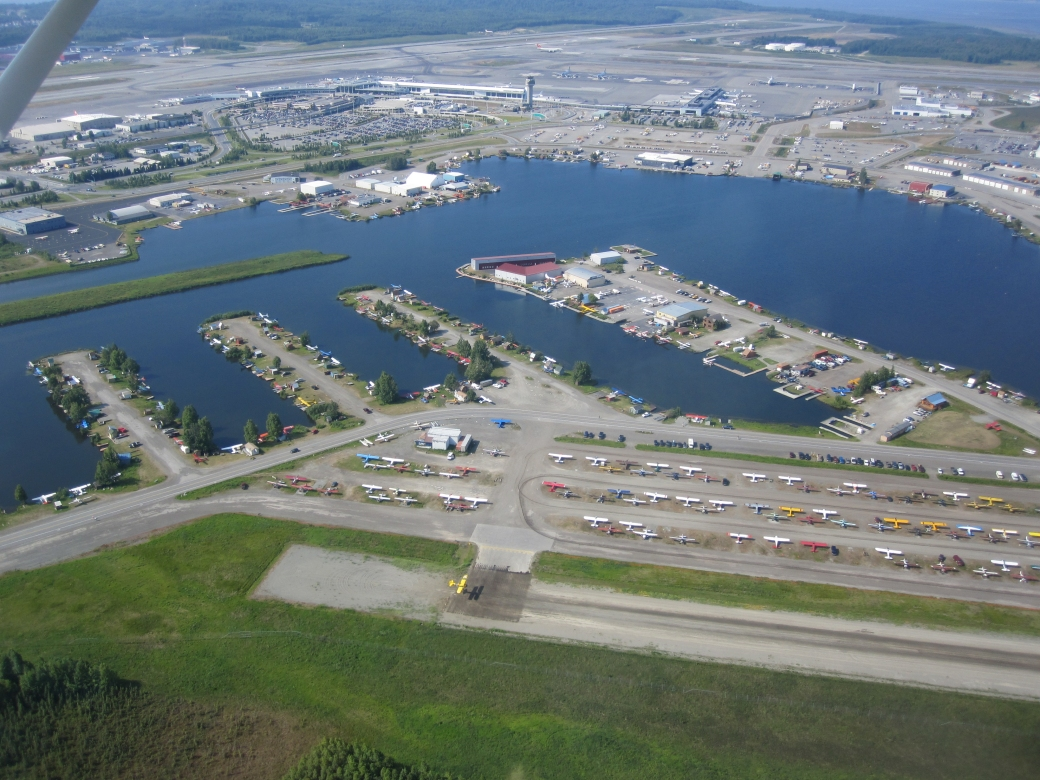
Lake Hood Seaplane Base and gravel strip

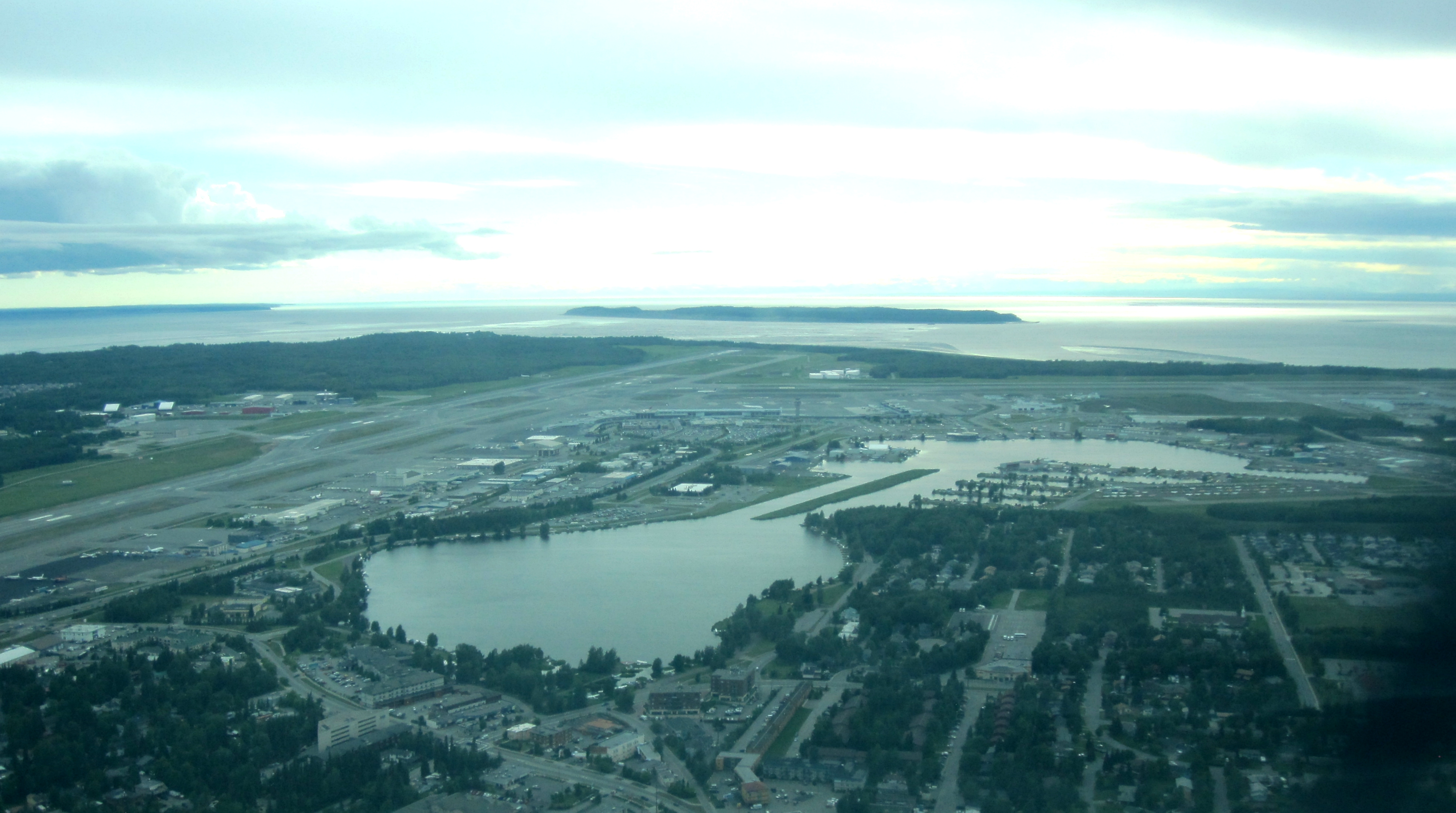
Lake Hood Seaplane Base, including Lake Spenard

== See also ==
- List of airports in Alaska
