= Standard instrument departure =

Departure route from an airport

Example of a SID of Pittsburgh International Airport

Standard instrument departure (SID) routes are published flight procedures followed by aircraft on an IFR flight plan immediately after takeoff from an airport. SIDs are one of the two types of departure procedures (DP); the other type being Obstacle Departure Procedures.

== Introduction ==
A SID is an air traffic control coded departure procedure that has been established at certain airports to simplify clearance delivery procedures. SIDs are supposed to be easy to understand and, if possible, limited to one page.

Although a SID will keep aircraft away from terrain, it is optimized for air traffic control route of flight and will not always provide the lowest climb gradient. It strikes a balance between terrain and obstacle avoidance, noise abatement (if necessary), and airspace management considerations. In order to legally fly a SID, a pilot must possess at least the current version of the SID's textual description. SIDs in the United States are created by either the military (the USAF or USN) or the FAA (which includes US Army fields). The main difference between US military and civilian SIDs is that military SIDs depict obstacles, ATC climb gradients, and obstacle climb gradients, while civilian SIDs depict only minimum obstacle climb gradients.

== Types of SIDs ==
There are three main types of SIDs: pilot-nav SIDs, radar vector SIDs, and hybrid SIDs.

A pilot-nav SID is a SID where the pilot is primarily responsible for navigation along the SID route. It allows for the aircraft to get from the runway to its assigned route with no vectoring required from air traffic control. They are established for airports where terrain and related safety factors dictate a specific ground track be flown.

A radar vector SID is used where air traffic control provides radar navigational guidance to a filed or assigned route or to a fix depicted on a SID. Flying a vector SID may require first flying an obstacle departure procedure (ODP). This is usually annotated in the ODP section stating, "Fly runway heading to (xxx altitude) prior to making any turns." This ensures the aircraft is clear of any obstacles. Vector SIDs give air traffic control more control over air traffic routing than do pilot-nav SIDs.

A hybrid SID is a departure that combines elements of both the pilot-nav and radar vector departures. A hybrid SID usually requires the pilot to fly a set of instructions, then be vectored to a defined route to a transition to leave the terminal area.

== Assignment procedure ==
Air traffic control clearance must be received prior to flying a SID. A SID clearance is issued to the pilot based on a combination of the destination, the first waypoint in the flight plan, and the takeoff runway used.

A standard instrument departure procedure consists of a number of waypoints or fixes, which may either be given by their geographical coordinates or be defined by radio beacons, such as VOR or NDB and radial headings, or a radial heading with a DME distance. It also includes a climb profile, instructing the pilot to cross certain points at or above a certain altitude. A SID procedure ends at a waypoint lying on an airway, which the pilot will follow from there.

SID procedures are defined by local authorities (governments, airports, and air traffic control organizations) to ensure safety and expedite handling of departing traffic and, when possible, to minimize the amount of noise over inhabited areas such as cities.

== Naming of SID procedures ==
Naming conventions for SID procedures vary by region.

In most of Europe, SID procedures are usually named after the final waypoint (fix) of the procedure, which often lies on an airway, followed optionally by a version number and often a single letter. The version number starts at 1 and is increased each time the procedure is altered. The letter designates the runway (the route to be flown to a particular fix depends on the takeoff runway).

For example, at Amsterdam Airport Schiphol, there are several published departure procedures to reach the GORLO waypoint (which is an intersection from where the (U)L980 or (U)P20 airways can be joined):

- The SID to GORLO from runway 09 is named GORLO2N (pronounced "GORLO Two November").
- Aircraft departing to GORLO from runway 36L will fly the GORLO3V departure ("GORLO Three Victor") instead.
- All names of SIDs from runway 09, whatever their final waypoint, will end in the letter N.

In the United States, SID procedure names are less rigidly formatted, and may simply refer to some notable characteristic of the procedure, a waypoint, or its geographical situation, along with a single digit that is incremented with each revision of the procedure. Thus, the LOOP5 SID at Los Angeles International Airport was so called because it was the fifth revision of a procedure that required aircraft to take off toward the west, over the ocean, and then make a roughly 180-degree turn (i.e., a loop) back toward the mainland.

== Deviations and separation ==
Though SID procedures are primarily designed for IFR traffic to join airways, air traffic control at busy airports can request that VFR traffic also follows such a procedure so that aircraft separation can be more easily maintained. Usually VFR pilots will be given radar vectors corresponding to the SID lateral route with different altitude restrictions.

Pilots must follow the published SID route, unless otherwise directed by an Air Traffic Controller. Small deviations are allowed (usually there are flight paths of some kilometers wide), but bigger deviations may cause separation conflicts. Pilots can be fined for too large deviations from the prescribed path.

The precision of SIDs also varies by region. In some countries and regions, every detail of the lateral and vertical flight path to be followed is specified exactly in the SID; in other areas, the SID may be much more general, with details being left either to pilot discretion or to ATC. In general, however, SIDs are quite detailed.

== Example of a SID at a major airport in Europe ==
As of 21 October 2010, there were seven published SIDs from runway 22 at Amsterdam Airport Schiphol, The Netherlands.

Among them, the ANDIK2G Standard Instrument Departure for reaching the ANDIK waypoint northeast of Amsterdam read as follows: (Note: The textual description of the SID is much easier to understand by following its graphical description on the chart.)

- Lateral route: Track 222° MAG. At 500 ft AMSL turn left (turn MAX 220 KT IAS) to track 093° MAG. At PAM 223 turn left to intercept PAM 207 inbound PAM VOR to intercept PAM 016 to ANDIK (25.2 PAM).
- RNAV (sequence of relevant waypoints): THR 22 / At 500 ft AMSL turn left / EH023 (MAX 220 KT IAS) / EH027 / PAM / ANDIK (Note: The RNAV data describes here a route which shall be considered overlaying the conventional Lateral route. It is only provided in order to be inserted in a flight management system's navigation database.)
- Vertical: Cross ANDIK at FL 060 (or above if instructed by ATC)
- After departure: Contact Schiphol Departure 119.050 MHz when passing 2000 ft AMSL. Climb to maintain: FL 060

== See also ==
- Standard terminal arrival route
