= Chenega Bay Airport =

Airport in Alaska, United States

- IATA: NCN; ICAO: PFCB; FAA LID: C05

Summary
- Airport type: Public
- Owner: Alaska DOT&PF - Central Region
- Serves: Chenega, Alaska
- Elevation AMSL: 72 ft (22 m)
- Coordinates: 60°04′38″N 147°59′31″W

Map
- Location of airport in Alaska

Runways
Direction	Length		Surface
Direction	ft	m	Surface
16/34	3,000	914	Gravel

Statistics (2015)
- Based aircraft: 0
- Source: Federal Aviation Administration

Chenega Bay Airport (IATA: NCN, ICAO: PFCB, FAA LID: C05) is a state-owned public-use airport located one nautical mile (1.85 km) northeast of the central business district of Chenega, in the Chugach Census Area of the U.S. state of Alaska.

== Facilities ==
Chenega Bay Airport covers an area of 123 acres (50 ha) at an elevation of 72 feet (22 m) above mean sea level. It has one runway designated 15/33 with a gravel surface measuring is 3,000 by 75 feet (914 x 23 m).

== Airlines and destinations ==
Airlines	Destinations
Alaska Air Transit	Anchorage–Merrill

== See also ==
- List of airports in Alaska
