= List of high schools in Alaska =

This is a list of high schools in the state of Alaska, United States with their athletic/extracurricular designations in parentheses as determined by the Alaska School Activities Association.

== Aleutians East Borough ==
=== Aleutians East Borough School District ===
School name	Location	Grade range	ASAA	2014 en- rollment
Akutan School	Akutan	P–12	1A	6
Cold Bay School	Cold Bay	P–12	1A	0
False Pass School	False Pass	P–12	—	4
King Cove School	King Cove	P–12	1A	22
Sand Point School	Sand Point	P–12	1A	32
Total grades 9–12 for district				64

== Aleutians West Census Area ==
=== Aleutian Region School District ===
School name	Location	Grade range	ASAA	2014 en- rollment
Adak School	Adak	P–12	—	5
Yakov E. Netsvetov School	Atka	K–12	—	3
Total grades 9–12 for district				8

- Unalaska School, Unalaska (3A)

== Municipality of Anchorage ==
=== Anchorage School District ===
School name	Location	Grade range	ASAA	2014 en- rollment
Alaska State School for the Deaf and Hard of Hearing	Anchorage	P–12	—	11
Avail School	Anchorage	6–12	—	61
Bartlett High School	Anchorage	9–12	4A	1,491
Benson Secondary/S.E.A.R.C.H.	Anchorage	7–12	—	247
Chugiak High School	Chugiak	9–12	4A	1,086
Crossroads School	Anchorage	7–12	—	30
Dimond High School	Anchorage	9–12	4A	1,698
Eagle River High School	Eagle River	9–12	4A	831
Bettye Davis East Anchorage High School	Anchorage	9–12	4A	2,161
Family Partnership Charter School	Anchorage	K–12	—	271
Frontier Charter School	Anchorage	K–12	—	173
Highland Academy Charter School	Anchorage	6–12	—	121
McLaughlin Secondary School	Anchorage	7–12	—	91
Polaris K-12 School	Anchorage	K–12	—	134
S.A.V.E. High School	Anchorage	9–12	—	185
Service High School	Anchorage	9–12	4A	1,772
South Anchorage High School	Anchorage	9–12	4A	1,448
Steller Secondary School	Anchorage	7–12	—	177
The New Path High School	Anchorage	7–12	—	29
West Anchorage High School	Anchorage	9–12	4A	1,901
Whaley School	Anchorage	P–12	—	273
Total grades 9–12 for district				14,191

- Alternative Career Education School, Anchorage
- Anchorage Junior Academy, Anchorage
- Anchorage Outreach/Private School, Anchorage
- Atheneum School, Anchorage
- Anchorage Christian Schools, Anchorage
- Birchwood Christian School, Chugiak
- Eagle Crest Academy, Anchorage
- Grace Christian School, Anchorage (3A)
- Heritage Christian School, Anchorage (3A)
- Holy Rosary Academy, Anchorage (1A)
- iGrad~Alaska, Anchorage
- Interior Distance Education of Alaska (IDEA), Anchorage
- Lumen Christi High School, Anchorage (1A)
- McKinley Heights School, Eagle River
- Pacific Northern Academy, Anchorage (1A)

== Bethel Census Area ==
- Akiuk Memorial School, Kasigluk
- Akula Elitnaurvik School, Kasigluk
- Aniak High School, Aniak (1A)
- Anna Tobeluk Memorial School, Nunapitchuk
- Ayaprun School, Newtok
- Chaptnguak School, Chefornak
- Chief Paul Memorial, Kipnuk
- Crow Village Sam School, Chuathbaluk
- Dick R. Kiunya Memorial School, Kongiganak
- Eek School, Eek
- George Morgan Junior/Senior High School, Upper Kalskag (1A)
- JoAnn Alexie School, Atmautluak
- Ket'acik-Aapalluk Memorial School, Kwethluk
- Kuinerrarmiut Elitnaurviat School, Quinhagak
- Kwigillingok School, Kwigillingok
- Lewis Angapak Memorial School, Tuntutuliaks
- Lower Kuskokwim School District
  - Bethel Alternative Boarding School, Bethel
  - Bethel Regional High School, Bethel (3A)
- Moses Peter School, Akiachak
- Nelson Island School, Toksook Bay
- Nightmute School, Nightmute
- Nuniwarmiut School, Mekoryuk
- Paul T. Albert Memorial School, Tununak
- QuQuum School, Oscarville
- Rocky Mountain School, Goodnews Bay
- Tuluksak School, Tuluksak
- William Miller Memorial School, Napakiak
- Z. John Williams Memorial School, Napaskiak

== Bristol Bay Borough ==
=== Bristol Bay Borough School District ===
School name	Location	Grade range	ASAA	2014 en- rollment
Bristol Bay Correspondence	Naknek	K–12		4
Bristol Bay Middle/High School	Naknek	7–12	2A	43
Total grades 9–12 for district				47

== Denali Borough ==
=== Denali Borough School District ===
School name	Location	Grade range	ASAA	2014 en- rollment
Anderson School	Anderson	K–12	1A	10
Cantwell School	Cantwell	K–12	1A	7
Denali PEAK	Healy	P–12	—	157
Tri-Valley School	Healy	P–12	2A	59
Total grades 9–12 for district				233

== Dillingham Census Area ==
=== Dillingham City School District ===
School name	Location	Grade range	ASAA	2014 en- rollment
Dillingham Correspondence School	Dillingham	K–12	—	3
Dillingham Middle/High School	Dillingham	6–12	2A	150
Total grades 9–12 for district				153

- Chief Ivan Blunka School, New Stuyahok
- Koliganek School, Koliganek
- Manokotak School, Manokotak
- Togiak School, Togiak

== Fairbanks North Star Borough ==
=== Fairbanks North Star Borough School District ===
School name	Location	Grade range	ASAA	2014 en- rollment
Alternative Learning Systems	Fairbanks	P–12	—	78
Ben Eielson Jr/Sr High School	Eielson AFB	6–12	3A	260
Effie Kokrine Charter School	Fairbanks	7–12	2A	86
Fairbanks B.E.S.T.	Fairbanks	K–12	—	159
Fairbanks Youth Facility	Fairbanks	5–12	—	18
Hutchison High School	Fairbanks	9–12	3A	372
Lathrop High School	Fairbanks	9–12	4A	1,113
North Pole High School	North Pole	9–12	4A	733
Star of the North Secondary School	North Pole	7–12	—	164
West Valley High School	Fairbanks	9–12	4A	1,024
Total grades 9–12 for district				4,007

- iGrad~Alaska, Fairbanks
- Interior Distance Education of Alaska (IDEA), Fairbanks
- Monroe Catholic High School, Fairbanks (3A)
  - Career Education Center, Fairbanks
  - North Pole Academy, North Pole

== Haines Borough ==
=== Haines Borough School District ===
School name	Location	Grade range	ASAA	2014 en- rollment
Haines High School	Haines	9–12	2A	99
Haines Home School	Haines	K–12	—	1
Total grades 9–12 for district				100

== Hoonah-Angoon Census Area ==
=== Chatham School District ===
School name	Location	Grade range	ASAA	2014 en- rollment
Angoon (Eli Katonook Memorial) School	Angoon	P–12	1A	19
Chatham Correspondence	Angoon	K–12	—	0
Gustavus School	Gustavus	K–12	1A	7
Klukwan School	Klukwan	K–12	1A	4
Tenakee Springs School	Tenakee Springs	K–12	1A	2
Total grades 9–12 for district				32

=== Hoonah City School District ===
School name	Location	Grade range	ASAA	2014 en- rollment
Hoonah Jr/Sr High School	Hoonah	7–12	1A	30

== City and Borough of Juneau ==
=== Juneau Borough School District ===
School name	Location	Grade range	ASAA	2014 en- rollment
HomeBRIDGE	Juneau	P–12	—	37
Johnson Youth Center	Juneau	5–12	—	8
Juneau-Douglas High School	Juneau	9–12	4A	680
Thunder Mountain High School	Juneau	9–12	4A	717
Yaakoosge Daakahidi Alt. H.S.	Juneau	9–12	—	140
Total grades 9–12 for district				1,582

- iGrad~Alaska, Juneau
- Interior Distance Education of Alaska (IDEA), Juneau

== Kenai Peninsula Borough ==
=== Kenai Peninsula Borough School District ===
School name	Location	Grade range	ASAA	2014 en- rollment
Connections	Soldotna	K–12	—	336
Cooper Landing School	Cooper Landing	K–12	—	1
Homer Flex School	Homer	9–12	—	26
Homer High School	Homer	9–12	3A	437
Hope School	Hope	P–12	1A	7
Kachemak Selo School	Fritz Creek	P–12	1A	17
Kenai Alternative High School	Kenai	9–12	—	71
Kenai Central High School	Kenai	9–12	4A	534
Marathon School	Kenai	7–12	—	3
Nanwalek School	Nanwalek	P–12	1A	20
Nikiski Middle/Senior High School	Nikiski	6–12	3A	230
Nikolaevsk School	Nikolaevsk	P–12	1A	22
Ninilchik School	Ninilchik	P–12	1A	50
Port Graham School	Port Graham	P–12	1A	5
Razdolna School	Homer	P–12	—	14
River City Academy	Soldotna	7–12	—	45
Seward High School	Seward	9–12	3A	184
Soldotna High School	Soldotna	9–12	4A	505
Susan B English School	Seldovia	P–12	1A	18
Tebughna School	Tyonek	P–12	1A	6
Voznesenka School	Fritz Creek	P–12	1A	40
Total grades 9–12 for district				2,911

- Cook Inlet Academy, Soldotna (2A)
- iGrad~Alaska, Kenai
- Interior Distance Education of Alaska (IDEA), Kenai

== Ketchikan Gateway Borough ==
=== Ketchikan Gateway Borough School District ===
School name	Location	Grade range	ASAA	2014 en- rollment
Fast Track	Ketchikan	K–12	—	36
Ketchikan High School	Ketchikan	9–12	4A	572
Ketchikan Regional Youth Facility	Ketchikan	5–12	—	1
Revilla Jr/Sr High School	Ketchikan	7–12	—	126
Total grades 9–12 for district				735

== Kodiak Island Borough ==
- Akhiok School, Akhiok
- Chiniak School, Chiniak
- Karluk School, Karluk
- Kodiak High School, Kodiak (4A)
- Larsen Bay School, Larsen Bay
- Old Harbor School, Old Harbor
- Ouzinkie School, Ouzinkie
- Port Lions School, Port Lions

== Kusilvak Census Area ==
=== Kashunamiut School District ===
School name	Location	Grade range	ASAA	2014 en- rollment
Chevak School	Chevak	P–12	2A	79

- Alakanuk School, Alakanuk
- Andreafski School, St. Mary's
- Emmonak School, Emmonak
- Hooper Bay High School, Hooper Bay
- Ignatius Beans School, Mountain Village
- Kotlik School, Kotlik
- Marshall School, Marshall
- Pilot Station School, Pilot Station
- Pitkas Point School, Pitkas Point
- Russian Mission School, Russian Mission
- Scammon Bay School, Scammon Bay
- Sheldon Point School, Nunam Iqua

== Lake and Peninsula Borough ==
- Chignik Bay School, Chignik
- Chignik Lake School, Chignik Lake
- Kokhanok School, Kokhanok
- Meshik School, Port Heiden
- Newhalen School, Newhalen
- Nondalton School, Nondalton
- Perryville School, Perryville
- Tanalian School, Port Alsworth

== Matanuska-Susitna Borough ==
- iGrad~Alaska, MatSu
- Interior Distance Education of Alaska (IDEA), MatSu
- Matanuska-Susitna Borough School District
  - Burchell High School, Wasilla
  - Colony High School, Palmer (4A)
  - Glacier View School, Glacier View
  - Houston High School, Houston (4A)
  - Mat-Su Career & Technical High School, Wasilla
  - Palmer High School, Palmer (4A)
  - Redington Jr./Sr. High School, Wasilla
  - Susitna Valley High School, Talkeetna (3A)
  - Twindly Bridge Charter School, Wasilla
  - Valley Pathways High School, Palmer
  - Wasilla High School, Wasilla (4A)
- Wasilla Lake Christian School, Wasilla

== Nome Census Area ==
=== BSSD ===
School name	Location	Grade range	ASAA	2014 en- rollment
Aniguiin School	Elim	P–12	1A	21
Anthony A. Andrews School	St. Michael	P–12	1A	38
Brevig Mission School	Brevig Mission	P–12	1A	25
Diomede School	Diomede	P–12	1A	4
Gambell (Apangalook) School	Gambell	P–12	1A	42
Hogarth Kingeekuk Sr. Memorial (Savoonga) School	Savoonga	P–12	1A	49
James C. Isabell School	Teller	P–12	1A	23
Koyuk-Malimiut School	Koyuk	P–12	1A	21
Martin L. Olson School	Golovin	P–12	1A	11
Shaktoolik School	Shaktoolik	P–12	1A	14
Shishmaref School	Shishmaref	P–12	1A	44
Tukurngailnguq (Stebbins) School	Stebbins	P–12	1A	44
Unalakleet (Frank A. Degnan) School	Unalakleet	P–12	2A	39
Wales (Kingikmiut) School	Wales	P–12	1A	6
White Mountain School	White Mountain	P–12	1A	11
Total grades 9–12 for district				392

- Nome-Beltz Middle High School, Nome (3A)

== North Slope Borough ==
- Alak School, Wainwright (1A)
- Barrow High School, Utqiagvik (3A)
- Harold Kaveolook School, Kaktovik (1A)
- Kali School, Point Lay
- Meade River School, Atqasuk (1A)
- Nuiqsut Trapper School, Nuiqsut (1A)
- Nunamiut School, Anaktuvuk Pass (1A)
- Tikgaq School, Point Hope (1A)

== Northwest Arctic Borough ==
- Aqqaluk School, Noorvik (1A)
- Buckland School, Buckland (1A)
- Davis-Ramoth School, Selawik
- Deering School, Deering
- Ikiaiaglig School, Ambler
- Kiana School, Kiana
- Kotzebue High School, Kotzebue
- McQueen School, Kivalina
- Napaaqtugmiut School, Noatak
- Shungnak School, Shungnak

== Petersburg Census Area ==
Petersburg High School Grades 9-12 145 Students 2A

=== Kake City School District ===
School name	Location	Grade range	ASAA	2014 en- rollment
Kake Elementary and High School	Kake	P–12	1A	30

- Petersburg High School, Petersburg (2A)

== Prince of Wales-Hyder Census Area ==
=== Annette Island School District ===
School name	Location	Grade range	ASAA	2014 en- rollment
Metlakatla High School	Metlakatla	9–12	2A	86

=== Craig City School District ===
School name	Location	Grade range	ASAA	2014 en- rollment
Craig Alternative High School	Craig	9–12	—	5
Craig High School	Craig	9–12	2A	91
PACE Correspondence	Craig	K–12	—	39
Total grades 9–12 for district				135

=== Hydaburg City School District ===
School name	Location	Grade range	ASAA	2014 en- rollment
Hydaburg School	Hydaburg	P–12	1A	15

- Klawock School, Klawock
- Southeast Islands School, Thorne Bay
- Thorne Bay School, Thorne Bay

== City and Borough of Sitka ==
- Mt. Edgecumbe High School, Sitka (3A)
- Pacific High School (Sitka, Alaska), Sitka
- Sitka High School, Sitka (3A)

== Municipality of Skagway ==
- Skagway High School, Skagway

== Southeast Fairbanks Census Area ==
=== Alaska Gateway School District ===
School name	Location	Grade range	ASAA	2014 en- rollment
Alaska REACH Academy	Tok	P–12	—	31
Dot Lake School	Dot Lake	P–12	1A	5
Eagle Community School	Eagle	P–12	1A	2
Mentasta Lake School	Mentasta Lake	P–12	1A	6
Tetlin School	Tetlin	P–12	1A	5
Tok School	Tok	P–12	2A	34
Walter Northway School	Northway	P–12	2A	9
Total grades 9–12 for district				92

=== Delta-Greely School District ===
School name	Location	Grade range	ASAA	2014 en- rollment
Delta High School	Delta Junction	9–12	3A	175
Delta/Greely Homeschool	Delta Junction	P–12	—	24
New Horizons High School	Delta Junction	9–12	—	15
Total grades 9–12 for district				214

== Valdez–Cordova Census Area ==
=== Chugach School District ===
School name	Location	Grade range	ASAA	2014 en- rollment
Chenega Bay School	Chenega Bay	P–12	1A	4
FOCUS Homeschool	Anchorage	P–12	—	50
Tatitlek Community School	Tatitlek	P–12	—	9
Whittier Community School	Whittier	P–12	—	5
Total grades 9–12 for district				68

=== Copper River School District ===
School name	Location	Grade range	ASAA	2014 en- rollment
Glennallen Jr/Sr High School	Glennallen	7–12	2A	98
Kenny Lake School	Copper Center	P–12	1A	25
Slana School	Slana	P–12	—	3
Upstream Learning Correspondence	Glennallen	K–12	—	10
Total grades 9–12 for district				136

=== Cordova City School District ===
School name	Location	Grade range	ASAA	2014 en- rollment
Cordova Jr/Sr High School	Cordova	7–12	3A	108

- Valdez High School, Valdez

== City and Borough of Wrangell ==
- Wrangell High School, Wrangell (2A)

== City and Borough of Yakutat ==
- Yakutat School, Yakutat

== Yukon-Koyukuk Census Area ==
=== Galena City School District ===
School name	Location	Grade range	ASAA	2014 en- rollment
Galena Interior Learning Academy (GILA)	Galena	9–12	—	217
Interior Distance Education of Alaska (IDEA)	Fairbanks	P–12	—	915
Sidney C. Huntington Jr/Sr High School	Galena	7–12	3A	34
Total grades 9–12 for district				1,166

=== Iditarod Area School District ===
School name	Location	Grade range	ASAA	2014 en- rollment
Blackwell School	Anvik	P–12	1A	1
David Louis Memorial School	Grayling	P–12	1A	6
Distance Learning/Corresp. Ctr.	Eagle River	K–12	—	16
Holy Cross School	Holy Cross	K–12	1A	5
Innoko River School	Shageluk	P–12	1A	2
McGrath School	McGrath	P–12	1A	13
Takotna Community School	Takotna	P–12	1A	2
Top of the Kuskokwim School	Nikolai	P–12	1A	1
Total grades 9–12 for district				46

- Allakaket School, Allakaket (1A)
- Andrew K. Demoski School, Nulato
- Fort Yukon School, Fort Yukon (1A)
- iGrad~Alaska, Galena
- Interior Distance Education of Alaska (IDEA), Galena
- Jimmy Huntington School, Huslia (1A)
- Johnny Oldman School, Hughes (1A)
- Kaltag School, Kaltag
- Maudrey J. Sommer School, Tanana (1A)
- Merriline A. Kangas School, Ruby
- Minto School, Minto (1A)
- Nenana High School, Nenana (2A)
- Project Education Residential School, Galena

== See also ==
- List of middle schools in Alaska
- List of school districts in Alaska
