= List of school districts in Alaska =

Districts in U.S state

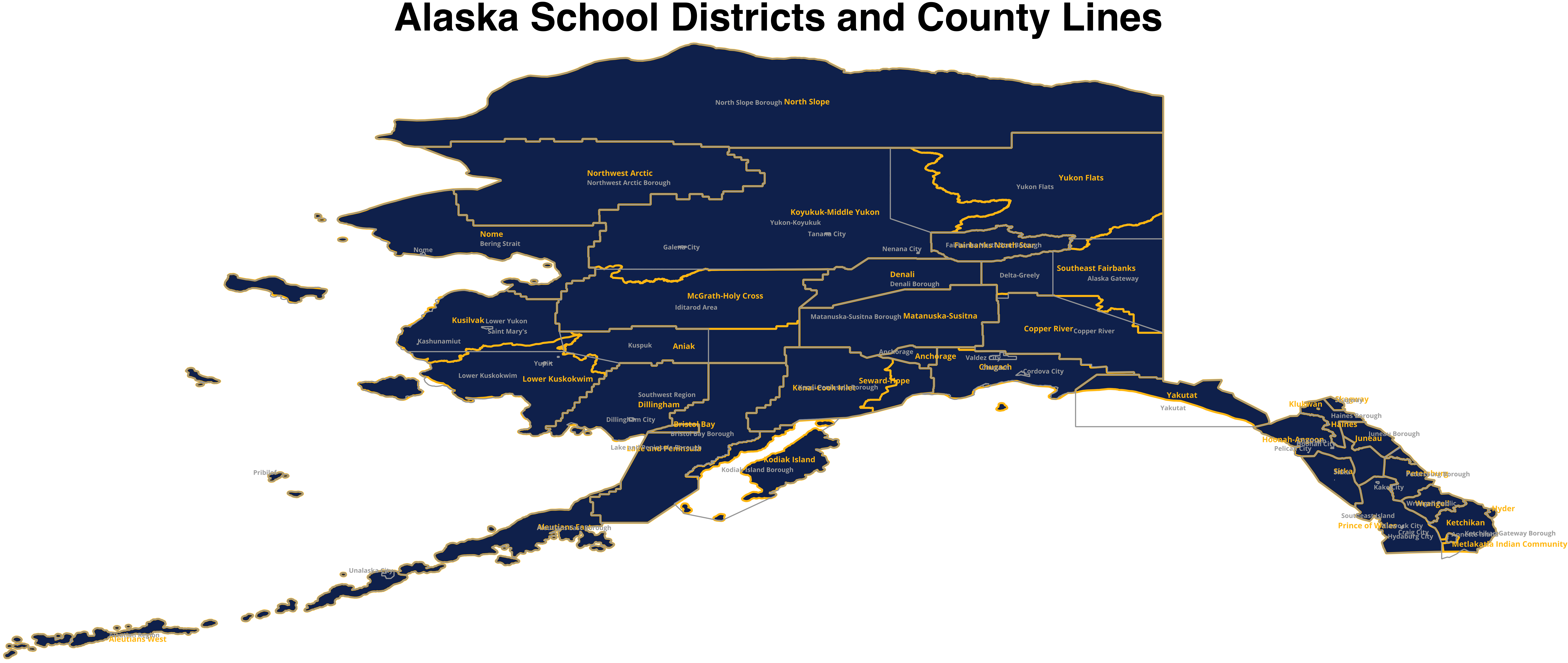
Alaska School Districts

This is a list of the school districts in Alaska.

Many school districts in Alaska are directly under borough and municipal governments. There are also regional educational attendance areas, school districts which cover areas not in a borough nor in a municipality. Elected school boards govern these school districts, but the state government completely funds these districts. The U.S. Census Bureau does not consider any Alaska school districts, including the regional educational attendance area districts, to be independent governments.

== Aleutians West Census Area ==
- Aleutian Region School District
- Pribilof School District
- Unalaska City School District

== Anchorage ==
- Anchorage School District

== Bethel Census Area ==
- Kuspuk School District
- Lower Kuskokwim School District
- Yupiit School District

== Chugach Census Area ==
- Chugach School District
- Cordova City School District
- Valdez City Schools

== Dillingham Census Area ==
- Dillingham City School District
- Southwest Region School District

== Hoonah-Angoon Census Area ==
- Chatham School District
- Hoonah City School District
- Pelican City School District

== Kusilvak Census Area ==
- Kashunamiut School District
- Lower Yukon School District
- Saint Mary's School District

== Nome Census Area ==
- Bering Strait School District
- Nome Public Schools

== Prince of Wales-Hyder Census Area ==
- Annette Island School District
- Craig City School District
- Hydaburg City School District
- Kake City School District
- Klawock City School District
- Southeast Island School District

== Sitka Borough ==
- Sitka School District
- Mount Edgecumbe High School

== Southeast Fairbanks Census Area ==
- Alaska Gateway School District
- Delta/Greely School District

== Yukon-Koyukuk Census Area ==
- Galena City School District
- Iditarod Area School District
- Nenana City School District
- Tanana City Schools
- Yukon Flats School District
- Yukon–Koyukuk School District

== Single-District Boroughs ==
- Aleutians East Borough School District
- Bristol Bay Borough School District
- Copper River School District
- Denali Borough School District
- Fairbanks North Star Borough School District
- Haines Borough School District
- Juneau School District
- Kenai Peninsula Borough School District
- Ketchikan Gateway Borough School District
- Kodiak Island Borough School District
- Lake and Peninsula School District
- Matanuska-Susitna Borough School District
- North Slope Borough School District
- Northwest Arctic Borough School District
- Petersburg City School District
- Skagway City School District
- Wrangell Public School District
- Yakutat School District

== See also ==
- List of charter schools in Alaska
- List of high schools in Alaska
