= West Valley High School (Alaska) =

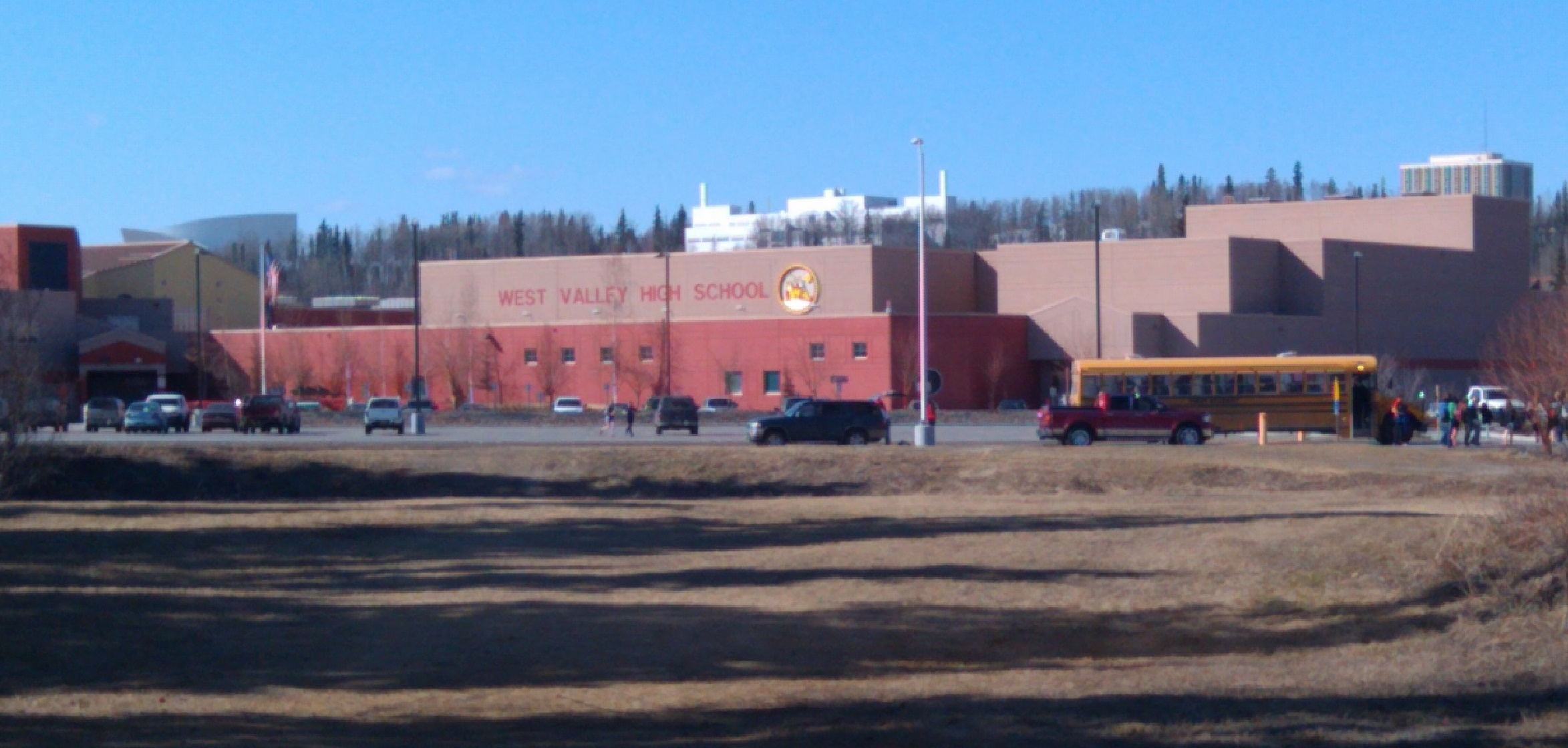
- View looking northwest at the school's front, photographed May 2011. Buildings of the University of Alaska Fairbanks, including the University of Alaska Museum of the North, can be seen in the background.

Location
- 3800 Geist Road; Fairbanks, Alaska address 99709; United States; 64°51′05″N 147°49′29″W

Information
- Type: Public secondary
- Motto: N/A
- Established: 1975 (51 years ago)
- School district: Fairbanks North Star
- CEEB code: 020028
- Principal: Mark Winford
- Teaching staff: 44.04 (FTE)
- Grades: 9–12
- Enrollment: 818 (2023–2024)
- Student to teacher ratio: 18.57
- Colors: Red and gold
- Athletics: Most sports
- Athletics conference: ASAA Mid-Alaska (baseball, basketball, ice hockey, soccer, swimming/diving, volleyball, wrestling), ASAA Railbelt (football, softball)
- Mascot: Wolf pack
- Rival: Lathrop High School
- Newspaper: The Howler
- Yearbook: Aurora
- Website: www.k12northstar.org/westvalley

West Valley High School (WVHS) is a public high school in College, Alaska, United States, with a Fairbanks postal address. It is one of four standalone high schools and one of ten schools offering instruction in grades nine through twelve in the Fairbanks North Star Borough School District. Physically located adjacent to the University of Alaska Fairbanks (UAF) campus in the census-designated place boundaries of College, WVHS and crosstown rival Lathrop High School cover a combined attendance area encompassing the majority of the urban core and outskirts of Fairbanks, with WVHS's attendance area serving the westernmost portions of that area. The Alaska Department of Education & Early Development reported the school's enrollment at 1,027 on October 1, 2015. The school mascot is the Wolfpack and its colors are red and gold.

== History ==
The architect of West Valley High School was CCC/HOK Architects and Planners of Anchorage. Originally scheduled to open at the beginning of the 1976 school year, construction delays caused the school to open after the school year had already started. To make up for the lost time, mandatory Saturday school days were put in place for three months. The facility was built to accommodate 750 students, but the 1976–77 school year saw over 1000 students. In 1994, the Hutchison Career Center, now called Hutchison High School and located next door to the east, started to house additional high school classes during the school day. A major renovation of the school was completed in 2000, roughly doubling the amount of classroom space to serve up to 1300 students.

== Building and grounds ==
WVHS and Hutchison were built on the southeast corner of the UAF campus, on a mostly undeveloped tract separated from UAF's lower campus core by the Alaska Railroad tracks (University Park Elementary was built on the northeast corner of that tract in the late 1950s). The grounds include a football field and track, a soccer field, a baseball field, and other recreational areas. The building has two floors and is divided into three main sections, one of which houses most of the classrooms, one the administrative offices and library, and one the gymnasium and other special-use rooms.

== Extracurriculars ==
=== Music ===
West Valley offers a variety of music electives, including Jazz Band, Concert Band, Symphonic Band, Concert Orchestra, Chamber Orchestra, Mixed and Concert Choirs, Varsity Orchestra, and Steel Drums. Many individuals and groups compete in the All-State Music Festival in the fall and Statewide Solo & Small Ensemble Competition held every spring. In the 2015–16 school year, four West Valley orchestra members received first chair awards at the All-State Music Festival. Also in the 2015–16 school year, West Valley boasted cello solo, flute ensemble, violin solo, mixed instrument ensemble, musical theater solo, and string ensemble all receiving command performances at Solo & Ensemble.

=== Sports ===
West Valley offers all standard high school sports, including swimming, baseball, basketball, cross-country running and skiing, football, gymnastics, hockey, soccer, softball, tennis, track and field, wrestling, rifle and volleyball. The West Valley girls' cross-country running team won the 2005, 2006, and 2009 state championships. They competed in Nike Team Nationals in 2005 and 2006. In the 2005 season they earned 15th place at the Nike Team Nationals and in 2006 were ranked ninth in the nation. The gymnastics team took the Regional Championships for 2007, 2008, and 2009. Other recent state championships include the 2005 state title earned by the women's cross-country skiing team, the 2005 state title earned by the women's track-and-field program, and the 2003 state title earned by the school's wrestling team. West Valley's wrestling program (over the years) has the most state titles compared to any other sport and also the most individual state champions. The school regularly sends participants to both regionals and state. West Valley wrestling created an Alaskan Dynasty by winning the state championships five years in a row from 1987 to 1991, and posting a duel match record of 176-1-1 under Coach Dave Toney and Tom Ritchie.

=== Academic Decathlon ===
West Valley has competed in the United States Academic Decathlon since 1986. Its Academic Decathlon team has won 11 state championships; its most recent victory was in February 2015. West Valley has competed at the national finals many times, including in Hawaii in April 2007 when it achieved the highest score of any Alaska school in history.

== Notable alumni ==
- Jon Button – bass player
- Linda Kay Fickus (1983) – the inaugural Miss Alaska Teen USA
- Vivica Genaux (1987) – opera singer
- Ruthy Hebard (2016) – WNBA player
- Kendall Kramer – cross-country skier
- Kelly Moneymaker (1985) – pop singer who performed with the group Exposé
- Heather Royer (1992) - economist
- Paul Varelans – mixed martial artist

== See also ==
- List of high schools in Alaska
