= NHHS =

NHHS may refer to:

- Nan Hua High School - Singapore
- New Hanover High School - Wilmington, North Carolina
- New Hope High School - New Hope, Alabama
- New Hope High School - Columbus, Mississippi
- New Horizons High School - Delta Junction, Alaska
- Newport Harbor High School - Newport Beach, California
- North Hall High School - Hall County, Georgia
- North Hardin High School - Radcliff, Kentucky
- North Harford High School - Pylesville, Maryland
- New Haven High School (disambiguation) - multiple schools
- North Hollywood High School - North Hollywood, California
- North Hunterdon High School - Annandale, New Jersey
- North Hagerstown High School - Hagerstown, Maryland
- The proposed New Haven-Hartford-Springfield Commuter Rail Line, scheduled to be constructed along the Amtrak New Haven-Springfield Line.
- Student Union of the Norwegian School of Economics and Business Administration
