= Tom Akeya =

Yupik ivory carver

Tom Akeya (born November 9, 1960) is a Siberian Yupik ivory carver. His work has been sold in multiple places.

== Biography and education ==
Tom Akeya was born on November 9, 1960, in Savoonga, St. Lawrence Island in Alaska. He attended elementary school in Savoonga, middle school at Nome-Beltz Middle High School in Nome, and high school at Senior High School which is also located in Nome. At the age of 9, Akeya learned to carve from his father. As Akeya grew older and became more skilled, he began to use skills as a means of self-sustenance. Carving became Akeya's main source of income and helped supplement his traditional subsistence lifestyle.

== Bowhead whale tracking ==
Bowhead Whale Tracking is a project that was started in 2006 by the Alaska Department of Fish and Game, the Alaska Eskimo Whaling Commission, Whaling Captain's Association of Barrow, Kaktovik, Gambell, and Savoonga, the Aklavik and Tuktoyaktuk Hunters and Trappers Committee, the North Slope Borough, the Barrow Arctic Science Consortium, the Department of Fisheries and Oceans Canada and the Greenland Institute of Natural Resources. The purpose of starting the project was to help the communities involved better understand and preserve Bowhead Whales since they are the main form of sustenance for these groups. Akeya helped track 2 specific bowhead whales in 2012. The two whales that were tagged by Akeya and his crew were the first whales ever to be tagged near St. Lawrence Island.

== Ivory carving and Yupik/Inuit art ==
Akeya was a part of the St. Lawrence ivory carvers, and they were the first ivory carvers to pioneer the usage of motorized tools to assist them in carving. Ivory carvings that originate from Savoonga are considered to be more realistic yet simpler in their presentation with a style that is easily distinguishable and Akeya is no outlier. Akeya is known for carving walrus, seals, bears, narwhales, whales, as well as turtles. One of Akeya's greatest talents when it comes to carving is his ability to convey characteristics of animals through his detailed carvings. In his carvings, he would often remove details that he considered to be extraneous while concurrently putting more focus into what he considered to be the most emotive features. With this approach, Akeya produces a style unique to him.

Since Akeya was also a subsistence hunter, one who only hunts for survival, most of the ivory that's used in Akeya's carvings are self produced. Akeya's ivory was either obtained through his subsistence hunting or excavating. Ivory itself is considered to be a dentine: a hard, dense body tissue that is found on most animals that possess teeth or tusks. Dentine is usually found with different layers: a first later that possess a creamy appearance with a second layer under that has a more crystallized appearance. The ivory that Akeya mainly used was a specific walrus ivory that could be denoted due to its multiple layers. Baleen, a stiff yet flexible material usually found on the upper jaws of whales, was another material that appeared in Akeya's carvings. Although it wasn't commonly found in Inuit carvings, Akeya managed to incorporate Baleen into some of his carvings.

== Works ==
=== Snow Goggles ===
Snow Goggles is a carving created by Tom Akeya before 2014. The main materials used are both leather and ivory. This carving was carved based on the utilitarian snow goggles that were used by his people during winter. These goggles helped Alaskan Natives navigate around winter while avoiding being blinded by snow.

=== Walrus with a Flipper in Salute ===
Walrus with a Flipper in Salute is a carving created by Tom Akeya that is carved from a marble-like piece of ivory. It is most likely fossil walrus ivory and the dark color indicates that the tusk was most likely found underwater. The tusks feature new ivory while the eyes are inlaid with baleen. In this carving, much of the focus was put into the eyes and flippers to help accentuate the characteristics of the walrus.

=== Mythical Tundra Turtle ===
Mythical Tundra Turtle is a carving created by Tom Akeya that features a walrus ivory base with mammoth ivory and baleen inlaid all around. This piece is considered as one of Akeya's signature pieces.

=== Ivory Owl ===
Ivory Owl is a carving created by Tom Akeya that features an owl carved from walrus ivory with mammoth ivory used for the eyes and baleen used for the pupils and beak.

== Collections (museums and galleries) ==
1. Although there are no specific works stated, he is featured in Arctic Spirit Gallery.
2. Underwater Ivory Walrus featured in Stonington Gallery
3. Although there are no specific works stated, he is featured in the Autry Museum of the American West.

== See also ==
- Yupik peoples
- Ivory carving
