= Marko Dapcevich =

American mayor

- Born: 1969 (age 56–57); Sitka, Alaska
- Occupations: Mayor; Politician

Marko Dapcevich (born 1969) is a former mayor of Sitka, Alaska. He is an "Honored Member" of a United Nations group, signed the US Mayors' Climate Protection Agreement, which is part of the Kyoto Protocol, and spoke out against Touchstone Pictures' non-use of Sitka for The Proposal. Dapcevich has testified before the Alaskan state Senate Finance Committee and has run for the Alaska State Legislature, District 2.

== Early life and education ==
Marko Dapcevich was born in Sitka to John and Janice Dapcevich, a nurse and a business man of Montenegrin Serb origin. He attended Sitka School District schools culminating in his graduation from Sitka High School in 1987. From there he attended the University of Oregon and later graduated from Lane Community College in Eugene, Oregon with a degree in automotive technology and attended University of Alaska Southeast in Sitka.

In 1994, he co-founded, with his brother, the Misty Fjords Water Company which was sold in 2004. As of 1998, Dapcevich has worked as a mailman for the United States Postal Service.

== Political career ==
Dapcevich was first elected in 2000 to a three-year term on the Sitka City and Borough Assembly and was re-elected in 2003 to another three-year term. His term was cut short when he won a two-year term as mayor in 2004 over the incumbent, Fred Reeder. In 2006 he won re-election to a second two-year term as mayor, beating former city administrator Gary Paxton.

As of 2005, Sitka and Dapcevich were recognized as cooperative members of the United States Geological Survey's water measurement agreement.

In 2006, Sitka residents approved an initiative that would affect the cruise line industry tourist visits. Speaking about the Sitka's Assembly majority vote, Dapcevich said, they used the words "cruise ship" because others might vote negatively against it.

On August 22, 2006, Dapcevich participated as Sitka's mayor to the International Association of Specialists on Russian America.

On April 10, 2007, Dapcevich testified from Sitka via teleconference before the Alaskan state Senate Finance Committee to retain the sharing of municipal revenue.

During May 2007, Dapcevish spoke about the housing construction boom on Baranof Island which is along Sitka's passage. He elaborated by saying, "Sitka has a very diverse population and income base."

On December 18, 2007, Dapcevich signed the US Mayors' Climate Protection Agreement thereby pledging Sitka to the Kyoto Protocol goal of reducing greenhouse gas by 2012.

In 2008, Dapcevich presented a framed picture of Sitka to a ferry service with Alaskan state Senator Bert Stedman in attendance.

When The Proposal, which supposedly took place in Sitka and was filmed elsewhere, Dapcevich said, "If a film is going to somewhat showcase your community, you would really like it to be your community being showcased rather than another community that is impostering your town." The mayor stated that the city would have welcomed Touchstone Films but could not provide tax breaks or incentives because of Alaskan laws.

On December 7, 2007, Dapcevich announced his candidacy for the Alaska State Legislature, District 2. Dapcevich was beaten in the August 2008 Democratic primaries by Lily Herwald. He was succeeded as mayor of Sitka by Scott McAdams.

== Honorary memberships ==
Dapcevich is an "Honored Member" of the International Royal Academy of the United Nations which has more than 1,000 members world-wide.

== See also ==
- List of mayors of Sitka, Alaska

Political offices
| Preceded by Fred Reeder | Mayor of Sitka; 2004-2008 | Succeeded by Scott McAdams |
