= Ben Grussendorf =

American educator and politician

Benjamin Franklin Grussendorf, Jr. (February 23, 1942 – June 17, 2011) was an educator and Democratic politician from the U.S. state of Alaska. Grussendorf represented Sitka, Alaska (where he lived for most of his life) and surrounding areas for ten terms in the Alaska House of Representatives, and remains one of the body's longest-serving members. He also served as Speaker of the House, becoming the first person to be elected to that office for three terms.

== Early life ==
Benjamin Franklin Grussendorf, Jr. was born in Grand Rapids, Minnesota, to Fern (née Ross) and Benjamin Franklin Grussendorf. He grew up there, where his father was a judge. He received a M.A. degree from the University of Minnesota. He moved to Sitka, Alaska, in 1966, where he worked as a teacher at Sitka High School and instructor in political science at Sitka Community College.

== Political career ==
=== Local politics in Sitka ===
Grussendorf entered politics when he served on Sitka's charter commission in 1971, responsible for merging the City of Sitka and the Greater Sitka Borough into today's City and Borough of Sitka. From there, he served on the new municipality's Assembly and was deputy vice mayor. He was mayor of Sitka from 1975 to 1979, also serving as president of the Alaska Conference of Mayors.

=== State legislature ===
Grussendorf originally ran for the Alaska House in 1972, unsuccessfully challenging appointed incumbent Edward Flynn in the primary election. Howard C. Bradshaw, Sitka's senator since statehood, resigned in late 1971 to become the director of the Sitka Pioneer Home. Sitka's representative, H. D. "Pete" Meland, was appointed to replace Bradshaw, with Flynn appointed to replace Meland. Flynn would lose in the general election to Republican nominee Richard Irving "Dick" Eliason, a former Sitka mayor who was originally elected to the seat in 1968 by 54 votes over Democratic incumbent Frank Getman, before losing reelection to Meland in 1970 by 22 votes.

Grussendorf again ran for the House in 1980, this time for an open seat, as Meland retired and Eliason ran for his Senate seat. Grussendorf would serve ten terms in the House, from 1981 to 2001. Grussendorf served three terms as Speaker of the House, 1985–1986, 1987–1988 and 1991–1992. He was the only person to serve three terms as speaker until 2013, when Mike Chenault was elected to a third term at the start of the 28th Alaska State Legislature. During his last term as speaker, Eliason finished up his legislative career by serving as Senate president prior to retiring. This marked the only time in the state's history that the legislature's two respective presiding officers hailed from the same community.

== Personal and later life ==
Grussendorf was married to Karen (née Solem) and they had two children, son Tim and daughter Karla. Tim Grussendorf was a longtime Senate aide, mostly during his father's tenure in office (the legislature's nepotism policy allow family members of legislators to work or seek employment in the opposite chamber). He has been a candidate for office himself, but without the success of his father.

Grussendorf was a Presbyterian. He died on June 17, 2011, after a lengthy illness.

== See also ==
- List of mayors of Sitka, Alaska

Political offices
| Preceded by Richard I. Eliason | Member of the Alaska House of Representatives from the 3rd District (-1993), 2nd District (1993-); 1981–2001 | Succeeded by Peggy Wilson |
| Preceded by Samuel R. Cotten | Speaker of the Alaska House of Representatives; 1991–1993 | Succeeded by Ramona L. Barnes |
| Preceded by Joseph L. Hayes | Speaker of the Alaska House of Representatives; 1985–1989 | Succeeded by Samuel R. Cotten |
| Preceded by John Dapcevich | Mayor of Sitka, Alaska; 1975–1979 | Succeeded by John Dapcevich |
