= Haines High School =

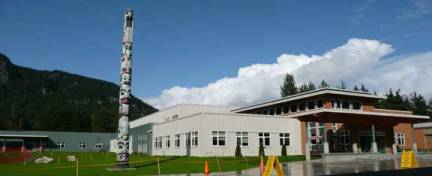

Location
- 604 Haines Hwy; Haines, Alaska 99827; United States
- Coordinates: 59°14′04″N 135°27′13″W

Information
- Type: Public secondary
- CEEB code: 020040
- Teaching staff: 8.07 (FTE)
- Grades: 9–12
- Enrollment: 78 (2024-2025)
- Student to teacher ratio: 9.67
- Colors: Green and white
- Mascot: Glacier Bears
- Website: hs.hbsd.net

Haines High School is the primary high school for the town of Haines, Alaska and the Haines Borough School District.

== Extracurriculars ==
Haines High School offers participation for all students in cross country, volleyball, wrestling, basketball, track and field, drama, swimming, debate and forensics, and music programs. Haines is classified as a 2A school by the Alaska School Activities Association and competes with other 2A schools in basketball and volleyball; 1A, 2A, and 3A schools in cross country, wrestling, and track & field; and competes with all schools in swimming.

== Academics ==
About 75 students attend Haines High School, taught by about ten teachers. The school has adopted the PBIS Method of school discipline.

In 2013, Haines High School was nominated as a Blue Ribbon School District.

== History ==
Haines High School underwent a renovation around 2008 which combined the town's elementary, middle and high schools.

The school is also sending roughly 75% of all its graduates on to higher education and less than 10% of the student body drops out. Both figures are above statewide averages.

The boys' basketball team won 3A State Championship in 2010.

The girls and boys cross country teams won the 2A State Championship in 2019.

== Notable alumni ==
- Bill Thomas (1965), Alaska politician
- Parker Schnabel (2012), gold miner

== See also ==
- List of high schools in Alaska
