= Petersburg High School =

Petersburg High School may refer to:

- Petersburg High School (Alaska) in Petersburg, Alaska
- Petersburg High School (Texas) in Petersburg, Texas
- Petersburg High School (Virginia) in Petersburg, Virginia
- Petersburg High School (West Virginia) in Petersburg, West Virginia

== See also ==
- St. Petersburg High School in St. Petersburg, Florida
