= TCSD =

TCSD may refer to:

- Tanana City School District - Tanana, Alaska
- Terlingua Common School District - Brewster County, Texas
