= Lumen Christi High School =

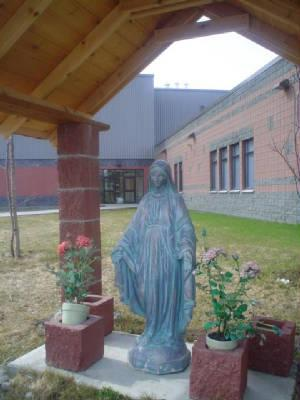

Location
- 8110 Jewel Lake Road; Anchorage, Alaska 99502; United States; 61°8′49″N 149°57′9″W

Information
- Type: Private, coeducational
- Religious affiliation: Roman Catholic
- Established: May 1996 (30 years ago)
- CEEB code: 020317
- Principal: Brian Ross
- Chaplain: Fr. Tom Lilly
- Teaching staff: 12.3 (on an FTE basis)
- Grades: 7–12
- Enrollment: 138 (2024-2025)
- Student to teacher ratio: 8.2
- Colors: Navy blue and silver
- Athletics: Soccer, volleyball, basketball, and track
- Mascot: Archangel
- Accreditation: Cognia
- Affiliation: Roman Catholic Archdiocese of Anchorage
- Website: lumenchristiak.org

Lumen Christi High School is a private Roman Catholic high school located in Anchorage, Alaska, USA. The school has a student body of 138 students, with 299 alumni as of 2025. It is affiliated with the Archdiocese of Anchorage.

== History ==
Lumen Christi Catholic High School was founded in May 1996. It was originally open to grades 7-10, but expanded to 11th in 1997, and 12th in 1998. In May 1999, three years after its founding, the first senior class graduated with three students. In 2000, the school moved from its founding address, 750 West Fireweed Lane, to its current address, 8110 Jewel Lake Road. It operates as a ministry of St. Benedict's Parish in Anchorage, Alaska. Lumen is a member of the National Catholic Education Association (NCEA) and is regionally accredited by the Northwest Association of Accredited Schools, through Cognia; their accreditation lasts until June 2027. It is a member of the Alaska School Activities Association for athletics and is classified as 1A school. Lumen Christi's mascot is the Archangel; the school's colors are navy blue and silver.

== Enrollment ==
As of 2025, the school enrolls 45 junior high students and 93 high school students. Its student-to-faculty ratio is 138-to-16 students to full-time faculty, or roughly 8.6 students per one full-time faculty member.

== Campus ministry ==
In 2015, Lumen Christi High School added campus ministry to its school life. It seeks to anticipate and provide for the faith needs of high school and middle school students, provide varied opportunities for faith development, and opportunities for school family to grow in faith and community. Among other opportunities, varied prayer, retreat, liturgy preparation, community, and collaborative teams are organized and promoted.

The current pastor of Lumen Christi is Father Tom Lilly; its campus minister is Doug Berry.

== Curriculum ==
Lumen is the only Catholic school in Anchorage that is recognized by the state of Alaska as an accredited high school, accredited by the Northwest Accreditation Commission through Cognia. Lumen Christi does not follow the Common Core Curriculum, which means that Lumen teachers and parents work together to set the curriculum. Furthermore, the curriculum is aligned to the recommendations by the United States Conference of Catholic Bishops.

== Tuition and Finances ==
As of the 2024-2025 school year, tuition for both junior high students and high school students is approximately $10,000 per student; this represents a 2.5% increase for high school students and a 7.5% increase for junior high students when compared to the 2022-2023 school year. In their annual report, Lumen Christi lists $1,392,880 in revenue from Tuition and Fees, $14,678 from Ordinary Revenue, $324,567 from Fundraising, $124,415 from Archangel Attic and Other Sales, and $7,126 from Investment Income, for a total of $1,863,666 in income. When matched with the school's expenses of $1,798,535, the school lists a surplus budget of $65,130, to be split equally between its Maintenance Fund, Personnel Support, and Discretionary Spending.

== Extracurricular activities ==
=== Athletics ===
For soccer, volleyball, and basketball, Lumen Christi is a part of the Peninsula Conference, formerly known as Region II, District III. Recognition for the past five years includes:

- 2013: ASAA 1A High School Boys' Basketball 3rd place State
- 2013: ASAA 1A High School Boys' Basketball Region Champions
- 2012: ASAA 2A High School Boys' Basketball Conference Champions
- 2012: ASAA 2A High School Boys' Basketball Region Champions
- 2011: ACSAA Jr. High Volleyball Champions
- ASAA 2A High School Volleyball Regions Runner-Up 2010
- ACSAA High School Soccer State Champions 2010

In addition to soccer, volleyball, and basketball, Lumen Christi also has a track team, and a riflery team.

=== Drama ===
Lumen Christi's Drama Club used to produce a comedy each spring. Previous performances include:

- 2017: "The Hollow"
- 2016: The Importance of Being Earnest
- 2015: Daddy's Girl
- 2014: Spirit
- 2013 Cinderella! Cinderella!

Since February 2022, no references to the Lumen Christi Drama Club have found on the Lumen Christi website; the 2024-2025 school report does not list Drama or a Drama Club among its extracurriculars.

=== Yearbook ===
Since its opening, Lumen Christi has published a yearbook annually. According to the Lumen Christi website, it is entirely student-made, student-designed, and student-refined. The yearbooks are distributed in early May.

=== Big A / Little a ===
Big A / Little a is a "peer-to-peer mentoring program with three primary goals: 1. To provide 1:1 connection for 7th and 8th grade students with an upperclassman in the 10th, 11th, or 12th grade; 2. To create connections between grade levels; 3. To foster community among the student body as a whole." The program began in 2010.

=== Debate ===
Lumen Christi has a high school-exclusive debate team. It meets after school, and is paired with a 7th period class. Lumen Christi students participate and compete in local and state competitions across Alaska.

=== Band and Choir ===
Lumen Christi has both a band and a choir; they are separate elements. Both are open to students and student musicians in all grades. According to the Lumen Christi website, band and choir class meet "twice per week during 7th hour and perform two concerts per year, winter and spring. The choir sings at Mass each Friday."

=== Intensives ===
Lumen Christi offers 6-week programs called Intensives that the school describes as "[a way to] provide students with 'hands on' learning and a means of practical application for real life skills." Some past Intensives have taught culinary arts, basic automotive maintenance, first aid / CPR training, and hunter safety.

=== National Honor Society ===
Lumen Christi opened its first NHS chapter in 2018. According to the Lumen Christi website, "10th-12th graders are selected to [participate in the] NHS based on certain criteria and are screened and approved by a Faculty Committee." Though the website fails to define the aforementioned 'certain critera,' it does state that NHS members "meet regularly and are expected to fulfill community service requirements above and beyond those required for Lumen Christi's Faith in Action program."

=== Student Leadership Board ===
Lumen Christi has a Student Leadership Board that "[meets] with the school administration every week during lunch to discuss student issues and share ideas." The Board consists of an Executive Committee (made up of the Social, Spirit, and Service Committee Chairs), and general Board members representing the athletic and extracurricular teams, alongside the Grade 7 - 12 class representatives.

== See also ==
- Catholic schools in the United States
- Higher education
- List of high schools in Alaska
- Parochial school
