= List of charter schools in Alaska =

The following is a list of charter schools in Alaska.

== Anchorage School District ==
- Alaska Native Cultural Charter School, Anchorage (PK-8)
- Anchorage STrEaM Academy Charter School, Anchorage (6-8)
- Aquarian Charter School, Anchorage (K-5)
- Eagle Academy Charter School, Eagle River (K-8)
- Frontier Charter School, Anchorage (K-12)
- Highland Academy Charter School, Anchorage (6-12)
- Rilke Schule German Immersion School, Anchorage (K-8)
- Winterberry Charter School, Anchorage (K-8)

== Fairbanks North Star Borough School District ==
- Boreal Sun Charter School, Fairbanks (K-8)
- Chinook Montessori Charter School, Fairbanks (K-8)
- Discovery Peak Charter School, North Pole (K-8)
- Effie Kokrine Charter School, Fairbanks (7-12)
- Watershed Charter School, Fairbanks (K-8)

== Juneau School District ==
- Juneau Community Charter School, Juneau (K-8)

== Kenai Peninsula Borough School District ==
- Aurora Borealis Charter School, Kenai (K-10)
- Fireweed Academy, Homer (K-6)
- Kaleidoscope School of Arts & Science, Kenai (K-5)
- Nikolaevsk Charter School, Nikolaevsk (K-12)
- Soldotna Montessori Charter School, Soldotna (K-6)
- Tulen Charter School, Kenai (K-4)

== Ketchikan Gateway Borough School District ==
- Ketchikan Charter School, Ketchikan (K-8)
- Tongass School of Arts and Sciences, Ketchikan (K-6)

== Lower Kuskokwim School District ==
- Ayaprun Elitnaurvik Yup'ik Immersion School, Bethel (PK-8)

== Lower Yukon School District ==
- Hooper Bay Charter School, Hooper Bay (4-8)

== Matanuska-Susitna Borough School District ==
- Academy Charter School, Palmer (K-8)
- American Charter Academy, Wasilla (K-12)
- Birchtree Charter School, Palmer (K-8)
- Fronteras Spanish Immersion Charter School, Wasilla (K-8)
- Knik Charter School, Wasilla (PK-12)
- Knik Charter Correspondence School, Wasilla (PK-12)
- Midnight Sun Family Learning Center, Wasilla (K-8)
- Twindly Bridge Charter School, Wasilla (K-12)

== Nome City School District ==
- Anvil City Science Academy, Nome (5-8)
