= Heather Royer =

American economist

- Born: c. 1974; Fairbanks, Alaska
- Education: West Valley High School (Alaska); Pomona College, B.A. University of California at Berkeley, Ph.D.
- Children: 2
- Scientific career
- Fields: Economics
- Workplaces: University of California at Santa Barbara, Case Western Reserve University
- Doctoral advisors: David Card
- Website: https://econ.ucsb.edu/people/faculty/heather-royer

Heather Royer (born c. 1974) is an American economist who is a professor of economics at the University of California, Santa Barbara and a Research Associate of the National Bureau of Economic Research. She has been an Associate Editor of The Journal of Human Resources, the Journal of Health Economics, and the Journal of Economic Behavior & Organization, and will become coeditor of the AEA Journal of Economic Policy in September 2021.

She was a member of the women's team that set a world record in a swimming relay from Palos Verdes to Santa Catalina Island in 1994, and swam the English Channel in 1999. She is a member of the Alaska Swimming Hall of Fame.

== Research ==
Royer's research focuses on causal inference in health economics. She has studied how education affects health using variation induced by school-entry and compulsory schooling policies in the U.S. and in England. In work with Stefanie Fischer and Corey White, she studied the effects of the closure of rural obstetrical units on infant and maternal health. The research reveals that while closures caused people to travel further in search of care, the care they received was of higher quality.

In work with Mariana Carrera, she also found that commitment contracts, which offered people funds to go to the gym during a three-month experiment period, were effective at motivating people to develop a habit of gym-going that lasted for years after the experiment ended.

=== Selected works ===
- McCrary, Justin, and Heather Royer. "The effect of female education on fertility and infant health: evidence from school entry policies using exact date of birth." American economic review 101, no. 1 (2011): 158–95.
- Clark, Damon, and Heather Royer. "The effect of education on adult mortality and health: Evidence from Britain." American Economic Review 103, no. 6 (2013): 2087–2120.
- Royer, Heather. "Separated at girth: US twin estimates of the effects of birth weight." American Economic Journal: Applied Economics 1, no. 1 (2009): 49–85.
- Royer, Heather, Mark Stehr, and Justin Sydnor. "Incentives, commitments, and habit formation in exercise: evidence from a field experiment with workers at a fortune-500 company." American Economic Journal: Applied Economics 7, no. 3 (2015): 51–84.
- Carrera, Mariana, Heather Royer, Mark Stehr, Justin Sydnor, and Dmitry Taubinsky. "The limits of simple implementation intentions: Evidence from a field experiment on making plans to exercise." Journal of health economics 62 (2018): 95–104.
- Stefanie Fischer, Heather Royer, and Corey White. "Health Care Centralization: The Health Impacts of Obstetric Unit Closures in the US." Forthcoming, NBER Working Paper 30141 (2022).
