= Nome Public Schools =

School district in Alaska, United States

Location
- Nome, Alaska United States

District information
- Grades: PK–12
- Superintendent: Jamie Burgess
- Budget: $14,500,000
- NCES District ID: 0200570

Students and staff
- Students: 672
- Teachers: 49.07
- Staff: 27.8
- Student–teacher ratio: 13.69

Other information
- Schedule: August–May
- Website: www.nomeschools.org

Nome Public Schools (NPS), also known as the Nome City School District, is the school district serving the city of Nome, Alaska. The district has one of the highest efficiencies in Western Alaska. The current superintendent of the district is Jamie Burgess.

Though public schools have existed in Nome since 1902, the present-day school district exists mostly to fulfill the obligation that first-class cities in the Unorganized Borough have under state law to provide education and planning/zoning functions within their cities. As such, it is separate from the Bering Strait School District which serves the smaller communities of the surrounding area.

NPS oversees five schools: two traditional grade-based schools (one for elementary grades and one for junior and senior high school grades), plus a charter magnet school, and a correspondence program. The school program located in Nome Youth Facility was closed on July 14, 2019 and no longer serves the community as an educational institution. These four schools have a total enrollment of approximately 720 students, with enrollment per school ranging from 15 to 375.

== History ==
The district's lineage extends to the establishment of the City of Nome in 1901.

The first local school in Nome was officially established in 1902.

=== Historic Superintendent List ===
Past NPS Superintendents

Superintendent	Year
James A. Riley	1901–1902
Will Henry	1902–1903
D. W. Jarvis	1903–1905
Professor D.H. Traphagen	1905–1907
Professor Edgar E. Grimm	1907–1911
Frank Xavier Karrer	1911–1914
C.W. Baird	1914–1916
Charles W. Thompson	1916–1918
Emma Lee Orr	1918–1920
Mrs. Frederick Bockman	1920–1921
T. Collins	1921–1922
Lars E. Rynning	1922–1925
D.W. Davis	1925–1926
Leo W. Breuer	1926–1928
Luther Dunbar	1928–1930
E.J. Beck	1930–1934
William H. Bloom	1934–1936
Calvin E. Pool	1936–1939
A.A. Ryan	1939
Frank Allen Smola	1944
William L. Angell	1944–1951
Oliver G. Boe	1951–1952
William L. Angell	1952–1959
Ira Alley	1970-1972
Darroll Hargraves	1974–1981
Larry LaBolle	1981–1987
Robert Shigley	1987–1989
Donald Darling	1989–1990
Larry LaBolle/Bob Kinna	1990–1991
Bob Kinna	1991–1999
Karen Ligon	1999–2000
Sharon Swope	2000–2001
Stan Lujan	2001–2008
Rick Luthi	2008–2009
Jon Wehde	2009–2011
Mike Brawner	2011–2013
Steve Gast	2013–2014
Shawn Arnold	2014–2018
Bill Schildbach	2018–2019
Jamie Burgess	2019–Present

== Schools ==
- Anvil City Science Academy, a 5–8 charter, is also part of the school district.
- Extensions Correspondence School
- Nome-Beltz Junior/Senior High School, serves grades 6–12.
- Nome Elementary School, serves grades K-5.
- Nome Youth Facility (CLOSED - July 14, 2019)

== See also ==
- List of school districts in Alaska
