= Petersburg High School (Alaska) =

Coordinates: 56.8146°N 132.9549°W

Location
- 109 Charles W St; Petersburg, Alaska; United States

Information
- Type: Public secondary
- Established: 1920s
- CEEB code: 020110
- Principal: Brad King
- Teaching staff: 11.94 (FTE)
- Grades: 9–12
- Enrollment: 144 (2024-2025)
- Student to teacher ratio: 12.06
- Colors: Blue and white
- Mascot: Viking
- Website: www.pcsd.us/page/petersburg-high-school

Petersburg High School (PHS) is the public high school for the Southeast Alaskan community of Petersburg and the Petersburg City School District. The current principal is Brad King.

== Extracurriculars ==
Petersburg is a class 2A school according to the Alaska School Activities Association. It offers:

- Cross country
- Swim and dive
- Volleyball
- Wrestling
- Basketball
- Track and field
- Music/Pep band
- Drama
- Cheerleading
- Baseball
- Native Youth Olympics

== History ==
School classes were first held for Petersburg children in the mess hall of Icicle Seafoods from 1904-'05. It is unknown where school was held from 1906 to 1913. In 1913 a schoolhouse was built at an unknown location. In the 1920s high schools in the US started to include grades 9–12, before the 1920s public school only was held for grades 1–8. 1927 was the year that held the first graduating class of Petersburg. The class consisted of Ruby Rayner, Alma Cornstad (valedictorian), Julia Wasvick, and Fred Nelson. The first known superintendent was C. H. Bowman, who held the position from 1927 to at least 1936. In 1931 a gym was built with a shop on the second floor. The current middle school was built in the 1940s- was high school until 1985 The Stedman Elementary school was built in 1968. In 1985 the current high school was built.

Notable State Championships are:

Division 3 Boys Cross Country State Champions 2024, 2025

Girls Cross Country State Champions 2017, 2024

2A Boys Basketball Champs 2017

2A Boys Basketball Champs 2024

== See also ==
- List of high schools in Alaska
