= List of mayors of Sitka, Alaska =

The following is a list of mayors of the city and borough of Sitka, Alaska, United States.

- Arthur G. Shoup, c.1917
- J.W. Johnston, c.1923
- Peter Kostrometinoff, c.1936
- Thomas Tilson, 1939-1940
- W.R. Hanlon, c.1942
- William Charteris, c.1948
- Dan Doyle, c.1950
- M.S. "Duke" Mitrovich, c.1952
- J. Earl Shennett, c.1955, 1962
- John W. O'Connell, c.1963
- Richard Irving Eliason, c.1968
- Les Shepard, c.1971
- John Dapcevich, 1973-1975, 1979-1985, 1987-1989
- Ben Grussendorf, 1975-1979
- Fermin “Rocky” Gutierrez, 1985-1987, 1993-1995
- Dan Keck, 1989-1993
- Pete Hallgren, 1995-1997
- Stan Filler, 1997-2001
- Valorie Nelson, 2000-2002
- Fred Reeder, 2002-2004
- Marko Dapcevich, 2004-2008
- Scott McAdams, 2008-2010
- Cheryl Westover, 2010-2012
- Mim McConnell, 2012-2016
- Matt Hunter, 2016-2018
- Gary Paxton, 2018-2020
- Steven Eisenbeisz, 2020-present

== See also ==
- Sitka history
