= Dick Eliason =

American politician (1925–2011)

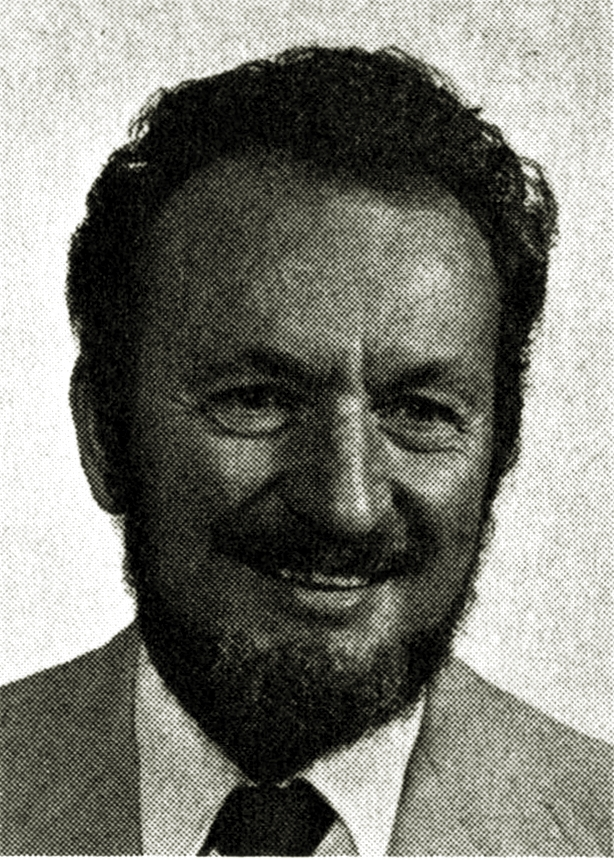
- Eliason in 1977

Personal details
- Born: Richard Irving Eliason; October 14, 1925 Seattle, Washington, U.S.
- Died: April 3, 2011 (aged 85) Sitka, Alaska, U.S.
- Party: Republican
- Occupation: Politician, commercial fisherman, pipe fitter

Military service
- Allegiance: United States
- Branch/service: United States Navy
- Battles/wars: World War II

Richard Irving Eliason (October 14, 1925 – April 3, 2011) was an American politician, commercial fisherman, and pipe fitter.

Born in Seattle, Washington, Eliason grew up in Poulsbo, Washington and Port Alexander, Alaska. In 1939, Eliason moved to Sitka, Alaska and graduated from Sitka High School in 1943. He served in the United States Navy during World War II. He was a commercial fisherman and pipe fitter in Sitka, Alaska. Eliason served on the Sitka City Council and as Mayor of Sitka. He also served on the Greater Sitka Borough Assembly. From 1969 to 1971 and from 1973 to 1981, Eliason served in the Alaska House of Representatives and was a Republican. Then, from 1981 to 1993, Eliason served in the Alaska State Senate and was president of the senate. Eliason died at Sitka Community Hospital in Sitka, Alaska. He also served in the Reagan Administration as a Commissioner on the International Pacific Halibut Commission from 1983 to 1989

== See also ==
- List of mayors of Sitka, Alaska
