= Delta High School (Alaska) =

Location
- 1655 N Clearwater Ave; Delta Junction, Alaska 99737; United States; 64°02′34″N 145°42′51″W

Information
- Type: Public high school
- School district: Delta/Greely School District
- Superintendent: Michael Lee
- CEEB code: 020023
- Principal: Shannon Jones
- Teaching staff: 13.15 (on an FTE basis)
- Grades: 9-12
- Enrollment: 159 (2023-2024)
- Colors: Green and white
- Athletics: 3A, Alaska School Activities Association
- Mascot: Husky
- Yearbook: Polaris
- Website: www.dgsd.us/District/Department/12-Delta-High-School

Delta High School is a high school in Delta Junction, Alaska operated by the Delta/Greely School District.
