= Holy Rosary Academy (Alaska) =

Location
- 1846 E 64th Avenue; Anchorage, Alaska 99507; United States; 61°9′43″N 149°50′54″W

Information
- Type: Private, Coeducational
- Motto: "Where faith and reason meet in the pursuit of excellence"
- Religious affiliation: Roman Catholic
- Patron saint: Our Lady of the Rosary
- Established: 1987 (39 years ago)
- CEEB code: 020298
- Principal: Marie-Louise Schirda
- Grades: PreK–12
- Enrollment: 168
- Average class size: 13
- Education system: Classical
- Colors: Green and white
- Athletics: Soccer, Volleyball, Basketball, Cross-country, Track & Field
- Athletics conference: Alaska School Activities Association
- Mascot: Knights
- Accreditation: National Association of Private Catholic and Independent Schools
- Website: www.hraak.org

Holy Rosary Academy is a classical school in Anchorage, Alaska, for grades PreK-12. It was a Catholic school under the Archdiocese of Anchorage–Juneau until 2021, when its status as a Catholic school was revoked following a governance dispute.

== Description ==
The Academy was founded in 1987 by a group of Catholic parents in Anchorage who desired a school where a sound education in Catholicism would be an essential part of their children's academic progress.

In 2019 and 2022, Holy Rosary was recognized as the best private high school in Alaska. The school's academic focus is on classical education focusing on fundamental educational skills of reading, writing and arithmetic as well as philosophical thought and classical languages, Latin and Greek.

Holy Rosary made headlines in 2021 for disenrolling a transgender student. Later that year, the school was stripped of its Catholic designation by Archbishop Andrew E. Bellisario of Anchorage-Juneau for refusing to comply with archdiocesan school regulations. This resulted in the school being barred from holding events at the Cathedral of Our Lady of Guadalupe. Though the school is no longer permitted to celebrate Mass on its grounds, in 2022 Bellisario restored permission for the school to reserve the Eucharist in their school chapel.

Holy Rosary made the The Heritage Foundation's list of approved classical schools in 2025. It moved to the former Rilke Schule charter school building in 2026.

== See also ==
- Catholic schools in the United States
- List of high schools in Alaska
- Higher education
- Parochial school
