= John Dapcevich =

American politician in Alaska (1926–2022)

John E. Dapcevich

Mayor of Sitka, Alaska
- In office 1971–1975
- Preceded by: Office established (Note: In 1971, Dapcevich became mayor of the newly-incorporated City and Borough of Sitka, which unified the former Greater Sitka Borough with the former City of Sitka. The final borough mayor was Howard Bradshaw and the final city mayor was Les Shepard.)
- Succeeded by: Ben Grussendorf
- In office 1979–1985
- Preceded by: Ben Grussendorf
- Succeeded by: Rocky Gutierrez
- In office 1987–1989
- Preceded by: Dan Keck
- Succeeded by: Dan Keck

Personal details
- Born: September 26, 1926 Hazleton, Pennsylvania, U.S.
- Died: September 1, 2022 (aged 95) Juneau, Alaska, U.S.
- Party: Democratic
- Spouse: Janice Dapcevich
- Children: 6 including Marko Dapcevich
- Occupation: Accountant

John Evan Dapcevich (September 26, 1926 – September 1, 2022) was an American politician in the state of Alaska.

== Biography ==
Dapcevich was born in Hazleton, Pennsylvania, in 1926 to Savo (Sam) and Stana Dapcevich, immigrants from Montenegro, where his father worked in coal mines. The family moved to Juneau, Alaska, in 1928 living with a Serbian community, with John entering school years later. He was married to Janice and resided in Juneau until his death in September 2022.

== Political career ==
He moved to Sitka, Alaska, in 1960 where he served six terms as Mayor during a span of 20 years. During his time in office, Dapcevich worked to successfully unify the City of Sitka with various borough governments. Upon his retirement in 1995, he moved back to Juneau.

He also served in the Alaska Public Offices Commission and Alaska Pioneers' Homes Advisory Board, serving under Governor Steve Cowper. In addition, he previously served in the Territorial Teachers' Retirement System and as a budget analyst in the territory's fiscal and budget management office. Dapcevich also chaired the Southeast Alaska Democratic Party and the State Central Council of the Alaska Democratic Party. He was awarded a lifetime achievement award by Governor Tony Knowles in 2003.

== See also ==
- List of mayors of Sitka, Alaska
