= Haines Borough School District =

School district in Alaska, United States

Address
- 604 Haines Highway Haines, Alaska, 99827; United States

District information
- Type: Public
- Grades: Pre-K–12
- NCES District ID: 0200270

Students and staff
- Students: 255
- Teachers: 20.5
- Staff: 23.88
- Student–teacher ratio: 12.44

Other information
- Website: www.hbsd.net

The Haines Borough School District is the school district administrating education in both the city of Haines, Alaska, United States, and also the Haines Borough.

== Schools ==
- Haines High School
- Haines Junior/Elementary School
- Mosquito Lake Elementary School

== See also ==
- List of school districts in Alaska
