= Pacific High School (Sitka, Alaska) =

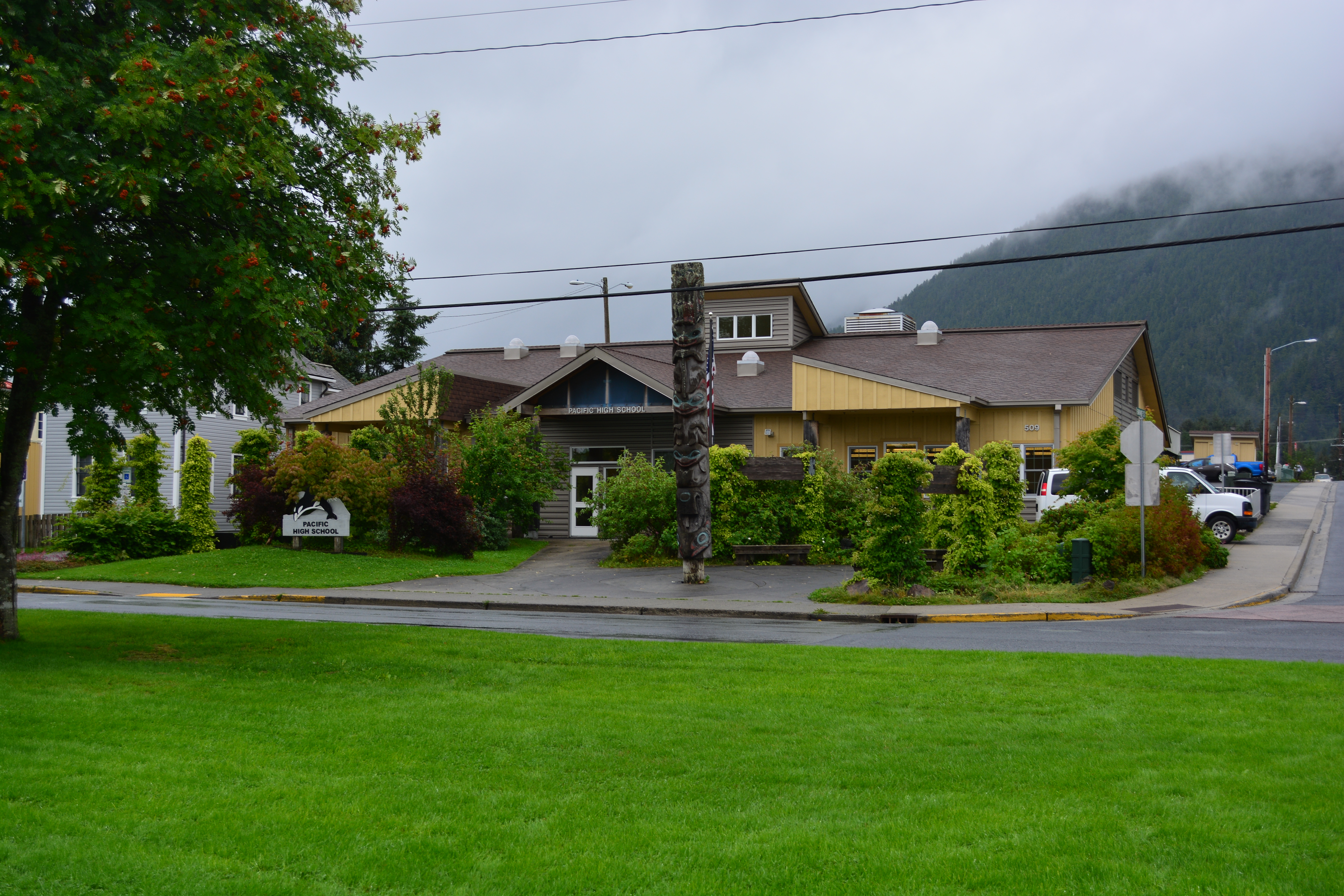

Location
- Sitka, Alaska; United States
- Coordinates: 57°03′06″N 135°19′49″W

Information
- Type: Public alternative secondary
- CEEB code: 020321
- Principal: Mandy Summer
- Grades: 9 – 12
- Enrollment: 45 (2023-2024)
- Mascot: Wolves
- Website: phs.sitkaschools.org/en-US

Pacific High School is an alternative high school in the Sitka School District located in Sitka, Alaska. It serves as an educational alternative to Sitka High School. It is based on the Expeditionary Learning Schools Outward Bound (ELOB) curriculum.

== See also ==
- List of high schools in Alaska
