= Chatham School District =

School district in Alaska, United States

Location
- Angoon, Alaska and vicinity United States

District information
- Grades: PK-12
- Established: 1976
- Superintendent: Elaine Hopson (interim)
- NCES District ID: 0200730

Students and staff
- Students: 161
- Teachers: 19.5
- Staff: 28.8
- Student–teacher ratio: 8.26

Other information
- Mailing address: Post Office Box 109, Angoon, Alaska 99820
- Website: www.chathamsd.org

The Chatham School District (CSD) is a school district headquartered in Angoon, Alaska. It serves Angoon, Tenakee Springs, Gustavus, and Klukwan and the surrounding areas of the Alaskan panhandle. As of 2009 the district served about 217 students in 4 schools and covers a territory of approximately 43,000 sq. mi.

== Klukwan School ==
In 2009 Klukwan School served about 41 students in grades pre-kindergarten through 12 in and around the Tlingit village of Klukwan, near Haines. As part of the school's mission is to support efforts to revitalize the Tlingit language, it offers Tlingit language classes.

As of 2013 the school periodically has three students from Klukwan and about 8-12 students from Haines, with a total student body of 11-15.

== Gustavus School ==
Gustavus School serves about 45 students in grades K-12 in and around Gustavus.

== Tenakee Springs School ==
The Tenakee Springs School is a school building in Tenakee Springs used to support homeschooling families; in periods prior to 2016 it was a full-service school. The building has three classrooms, a commercial grade kitchen, and a library. Jennifer Canfield of Juneau Empire described it as "a relatively large facility."

== Angoon Schools ==
Angoon Elementary School and Angoon High School serve about 125 students.

== Correspondence school ==
The district operates a correspondence school.

== Former schools ==
Cube Cove School, closed in or before 2002.

== See also ==
- List of school districts in Alaska
