= Ketchikan Gateway Borough School District =

School district in Alaska

Address
- 2610 Fourth Avenue Ketchikan, Alaska, 99901; United States

District information
- Type: Public
- Grades: Pre-K–12
- NCES District ID: 0200150

Students and staff
- Students: 2,043
- Teachers: 147.5
- Staff: 169.5
- Student–teacher ratio: 13.85

Other information
- Website: www.kgbsd.org

The Ketchikan Gateway Borough School District provides K–12 public education to the children of the Ketchikan Gateway Borough and Ketchikan, Alaska. The district is governed by a school board of seven community-elected members, with one advisory student member present during the school year, elected by the students of Ketchikan High School.

== Schools ==
=== High schools ===
- Ketchikan High School
- Revilla Junior/Senior High school

=== Middle school ===
- Schoenbar Middle School

=== Elementary schools ===
- Houghtaling Elementary School
- Fawn Mountain Elementary School
- Point Higgins Elementary School
- Ketchikan Charter School
- Tongass School of Arts & Sciences

== World War II ==
The Territory of Alaska presented Alaska's Liberty brick to the Ketchikan Schools on Pearl Harbor Day, 1943 for having the best Schools at War performance in the territory in the previous school year. Each of Ketchikan's schools also received a Minute Man Flag. The brick, displayed in a glass case, was to be permanently belong to the Ketchikan Schools. As of 2021, it is in the collection of the Tongass Historical Museum in Ketchikan.

== See also ==
- List of school districts in Alaska
