= Valdez City Schools =

School district in Alaska, United States

Address
- 1112 West Klutina Street Valdez, Alaska, 99686; United States

District information
- Motto: Where the Mountains Meet the Sea
- Grades: PK - 12
- Superintendent: Jason Weber
- NCES District ID: 0200780

Students and staff
- Students: 605
- Teachers: 45.50
- Staff: 81.25
- Student–teacher ratio: 13.30

Other information
- Website: www.valdezcityschools.org

Valdez City Schools is a school district in Valdez, Alaska.

It has three schools: Hermon Hutchens Elementary, George H. Gilson Middle School, and Valdez High School.

== History ==
On May 25, 1901, Mrs. Alice Leedy opened a school in the Episcopal Church.

The school district itself was founded on September 6, 1901. Adam Wan was elected president. School opened on September 9 and met in City Hall. Mrs. Alice Leedy was the teacher. Only students ages 6 and older were eligible to attend.

The first actual school building opened on November 11, 1901.

By 1903, there were 3 classrooms and 60 students, one each for primary, intermediate, and upper grades.

By 1912, the high school served 4 grades and by 1913 the school had its first graduate.

After the entire town moved as a result of the 1964 Alaska earthquake, new schools were built, including Growden-Harrison Elementary School, which was the first building completed as part of the post-earthquake relocation effort. This school was named after two victims of the earthquake. Growden-Harrison ceased being an elementary school in 1986.
