= Delta/Greely School District =

School district in Alaska, United States

Address
- 1664 North Clearwater Avenue Delta Junction, Alaska, 99737; United States

District information
- Type: Public
- Grades: PreK–12
- NCES District ID: 0200100

Students and staff
- Students: 971
- Teachers: 46.19
- Staff: 50.94
- Student–teacher ratio: 21.02

Other information
- Website: www.dgsd.us

Delta/Greely School District is a school district in Delta Junction, Alaska. The superintendent is Michael Lee. It operates the following schools:

- Delta Elementary School
- Delta High School
- Fort Greely School
- New Horizons High School
- Delta/Greely Homeschool
- Gerstle River School
