= Matanuska-Susitna Borough School District =

School district in Alaska, United States

Address
- 501 North Gulkana Street Palmer, Alaska, 99645; United States

District information
- Type: Public
- Motto: Preparing Students for Success
- Grades: PK–12
- Superintendent: Randy Trani
- Budget: $150,531,684
- NCES District ID: 0200510

Students and staff
- Students: 19,495
- Teachers: 1,015.1
- Staff: 1,242.65
- Student–teacher ratio: 19.21

Other information
- Schedule: August to May
- Website: www.matsuk12.us

Matanuska-Susitna Borough School District (MSBSD) is a school district based in the city of Palmer, Alaska. It serves 40 schools across Mat-Su Borough, which each enroll from 15 to 1300 students. The borough's boundary is that of the school district. The estimated sum of the total number of students attending schools in this district is 15,969. MSBSD is the second-largest school district in Alaska, with the largest district being Anchorage School District.

In the 2007-2008 school year, Matanuska-Susitna Borough School District had an expenditure of $150,531,684, which is a $9,426 expenditure for every student.

The current superintendent is Dr. Randy Trani.

== History ==
In April 2020 the school district board deemed five books, Catch-22, The Great Gatsby, I Know Why the Caged Bird Sings, Invisible Man, and The Things They Carried, to be inappropriate for use in the classroom. Among the reasons cited were "anti-white" sentiments. A local attorney responded with a "book challenge," asking students to read all five works. In May of that year the school board restored the books to the curriculum.

== Schools ==
=== K-12 schools ===
- Beryozova School, a public K-12 school in Willow
- Correspondence Study School, a public K-12 school in Wasilla
- Glacier View School, a public K-12 school
- Twindly Bridge Charter School, a public K-12 school, in Wasilla

=== 6-12 schools ===
- Susitna Valley Junior/Senior High School, a public secondary school, serving grades 6–12, in Talkeetna
- Joe Redington Senior Junior/Senior High School, a public secondary school, serving grades 6–12, in Knik

=== High schools ===
- Burchell High School, a public alternative school in Wasilla
- Colony High School, a public secondary school near Palmer
- Houston High School, a public secondary school in Houston
- Mat-Su Career and Technical High School, a public secondary school in Wasilla
- Palmer High School, a public secondary school in Palmer
- Valley Pathways High School, a public alternative school in Palmer
- Wasilla High School, a public 9–12 school in Wasilla

=== K-8 schools ===
- Academy Charter School, a charter school, serving grades K–8, in Palmer
- Fronteras Spanish Immersion Charter School K-8, a public charter school in Wasilla

=== Middle schools ===
- Colony Middle School, a public middle school in Palmer
- Houston Middle School, a public middle school in Big Lake
- Palmer Middle School, a public middle school in Palmer
- Teeland Middle School, a public middle school in Wasilla
- Wasilla Middle School, a public middle school in Wasilla

=== Elementary schools ===
- Big Lake Elementary School in Big Lake
- Butte Elementary School in Palmer
- Cottonwood Creek Elementary School in Wasilla
- Dena'ina Elementary in Wasilla
- Finger Lake Elementary School in Wasilla
- Goose Bay Elementary School in Wasilla
- Iditarod Elementary School in Wasilla
- John Shaw Elementary School in Wasilla
- Larson Elementary School in Wasilla
- Machetanz Elementary School in Wasilla
- Meadow Lakes Elementary School in Wasilla
- Pioneer Peak Elementary School in Palmer
- Sherrod Elementary School in Palmer
- Snowshoe Elementary School in Wasilla
- Sutton Elementary School in Sutton
- Swanson Elementary School in Palmer
- Talkeetna Elementary School in Talkeetna
- Tanaina Elementary School in Wasilla
- Trapper Creek Elementary School in Trapper Creek
- Willow Elementary School in Willow

== See also ==
- List of school districts in Alaska
