= Sitka School District =

School district in Alaska, United States

Address
- 300 Kostrometinoff Street Sitka, Alaska, 99835; United States

District information
- Type: Public
- Grades: Pre-K–12
- NCES District ID: 0200240

Students and staff
- Students: 1,080
- Teachers: 79.9
- Staff: 85.26
- Student–teacher ratio: 13.52

Other information
- Website: www.sitkaschools.org

The Sitka School District (or SSD) provides for the educational needs of citizens of Sitka, Alaska. The district's offices are located in Keet Gooshi Heen Elementary School.

The Sitka School District's enrollment usually hovers between 1,400 and 1,500 students in its K-12 enrollment figure.

A common misconception especially among those outside of Sitka is that the statewide public boarding high school, Mt. Edgecumbe High School, is part of the district when in fact it is administered directly by the State of Alaska.

== List of Sitka School District schools ==
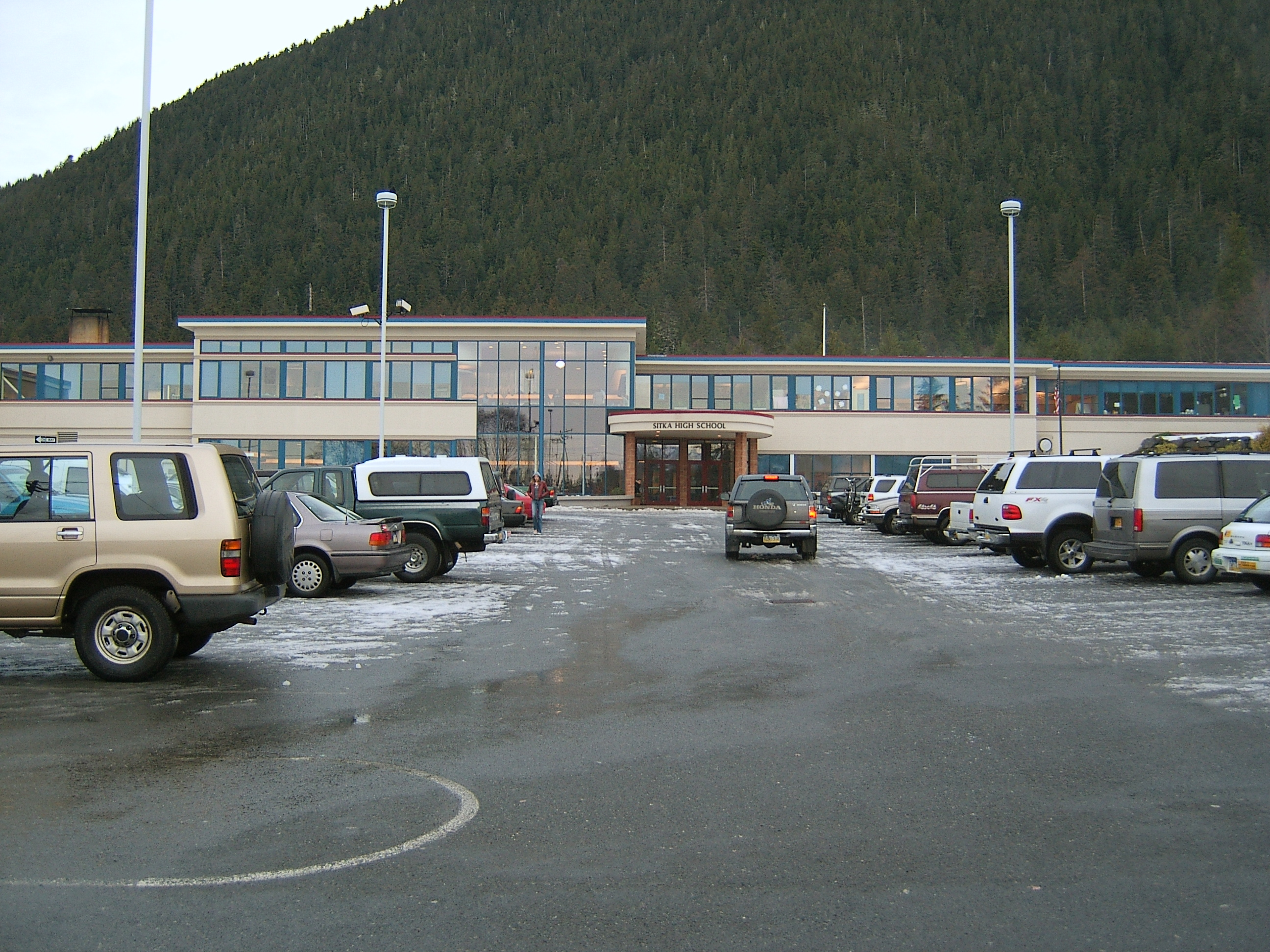
Sitka High School

- Baranof Elementary School (Renamed to Xóots Elementary School in 2024)
- Blatchley Middle School
- Keet Gooshi Heen Elementary School (formerly Verstovia Elementary)
- Pacific High School (Sitka) (the local alternative high school)
- Sitka High School (the primary local high school)

== See also ==
- List of school districts in Alaska
