= Aklavik First Nation =

Gwich'in First Nations band government in the Northwest Territories, Canada

Aklavik First Nation Band No. 755
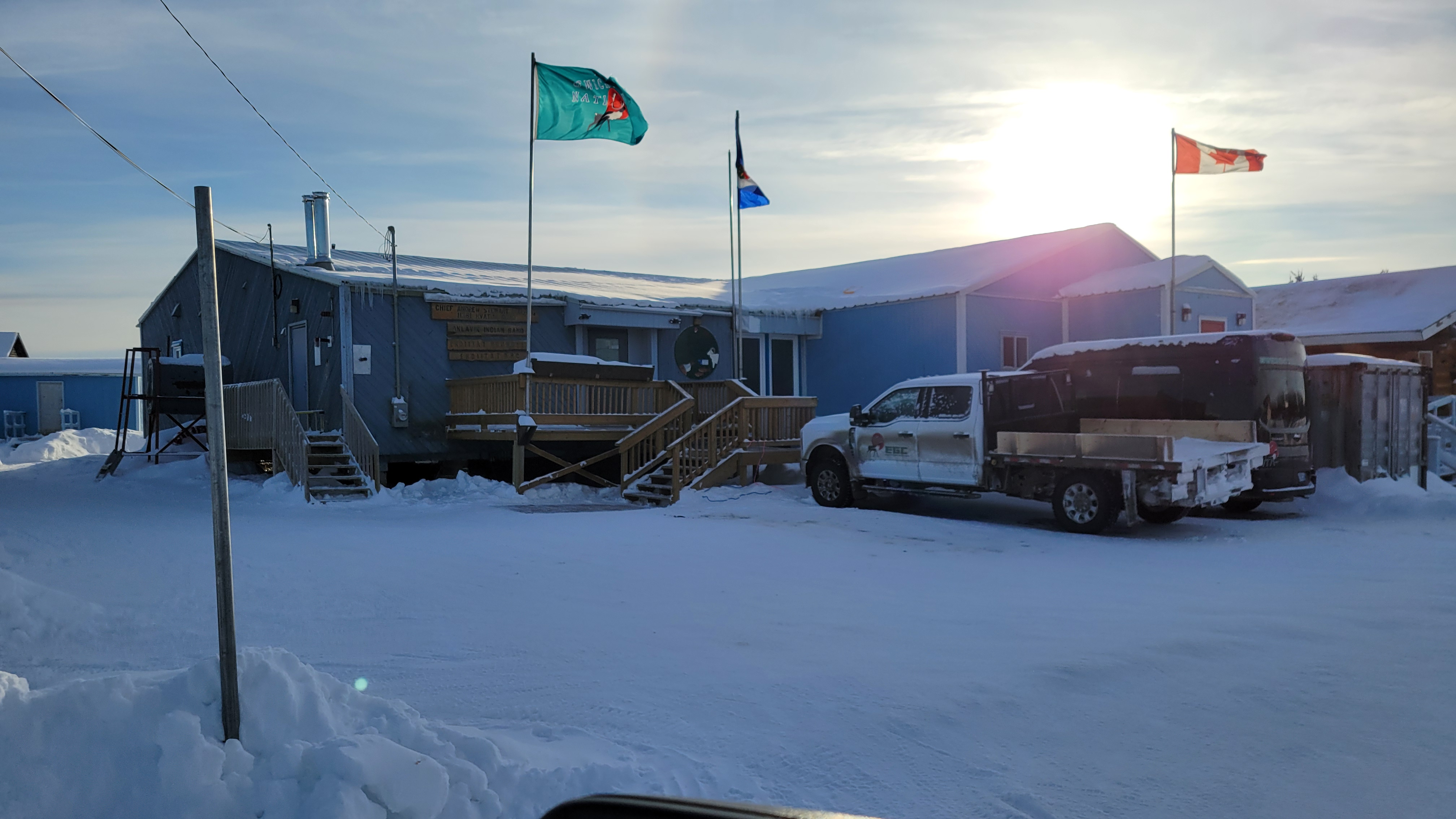
- Ehdiitat Gwich'in Council building in Aklavik
- People: Gwich'in
- Treaty: Treaty 11
- Headquarters: Aklavik
- Territory: Northwest Territories

Population (2019)
- On other land: 258
- Off reserve: 181
- Total population: 439

Tribal Council
- Gwich'in Tribal Council

The Aklavik First Nation is a Gwich'in First Nations band government in the Northwest Territories. The band is located in Aklavik, a mixed community of First Nations, Inuit, and non-Indigenous people.

The Aklavik First Nation, also known as the Edhiitat Gwich'in Council, is one of the thirteen members of the Gwich'in Tribal Council.

== Origin ==
People of the Gwich'in culture believe that man and caribou were once one and the same. When they separated, a small part of their hearts remained with each other, and were therefore connected eternally. After separating, the Gwich'in and the caribou entered an agreement in which the land would sustain the caribou and the caribou would sustain the people and the people would protect the land. Oral traditions say that they have been living in harmony for millennia. It is conventionally believed that they have been living in the area for around 20,000 years

== Language ==
The Aklavik First Nation, along with all people of Gwich'in culture, traditionally spoke Dinjii Zhu’ Ginjik. An Athapaskan language, Dinjii Zhu’ Ginjik is one of the most endangered languages in Canada. As of 2006, only 20 people reportedly spoke it in their homes and 275 people were able to speak it, the majority of these people being elders.

== Geography ==
The Aklavik First Nation is based in the town of Aklavik, located in the sparsely populated province of the Northwest Territories in Northern Canada. The Aklavik Settlement is a Gwich'in reservation located east of the town, but lacks year-round road access. 90% of the transportation is air-based, making the cost of transportation too high for most people to live on the settlement. According to the Government of Canada, there are currently only 5 people registered as living on reservation land. The surrounding forest and nearby Great Plains are home to the Porcupine caribou herd, a herd of caribou named after the Porcupine River consisting of 169,000 animals.

=== Environmental issues ===
The Great Plains of the Arctic National Wildlife Refuge, the breeding ground for the Porcupine caribou herd, is known to the Gwich'in people as Iizhik Gwats’an Gwandaii Goodlit, or "The Sacred Place Where Life Begins". However, deposits of oil have been found on the land. The proposed drilling and accompanying development could have a negative effect to the Gwich'in way of life.

== Economy ==
The Aklavik First Nation receives annuity payments ranging from $300k-$600k from the Canadian Government. Below is the amount of money received in the fiscal years of 2001-2006.

Annuity Payments to the Aklavik First Nation
Fiscal Year	CAD
2001-2002	$305,601
2002-2003	$380,655
2003-2004	$545,339
2004-2005	$389,052
2005-2006	$364,501

Hunting, fishing and trapping makes up the largest portion of their economy. However, local retail, transportation, arts and crafts, tourism and mineral and gas extraction all contribute significantly to the economy. Caribou in particular remain the biggest source of food, clothing and tools. Moose, Whitefish and Bowhead whales also make up a large part of their diet.

== Society ==
Traditionally in Aklavik First Nation Society, men would be responsible for fishing, hunting and participating in battles. Women were responsible for gathering plants, crafting goods and moving camps when the land had been exhausted. Face painting and decorating one's clothing with beads, feathers and fringes was common.

== Governance ==
Each First Nation that is recognized by Canada has the option to be governed under the Indian Act Election System, the First Nations Election Act, or a custom system. The Aklavik First Nation chose a Custom Electoral System. The current Chief of the Aklavik First Nation is Danny Greenland. The current Councillor is Kathy Greenland.

== History ==
The Aklavik First Nation is one of the many bands of Gwich'in People. Gwich'in is both a cultural and linguistic distinction. Today the town of Aklavik is a mixed community, but this was not always the case. The people of the Aklavik First Nation commonly interacted with their more northern Inuit historical neighbors. Although the two tribes often fought, there was also plenty of trading of goods and ideas. The Aklavik people adopted many Inuit inventions, such as the Eskimo hood and mittens and the sled.

The Aklavik way of life has always revolved around the Porcupine caribou herd. The herd supplied food, clothing and tools to the people, but also was a symbol of culture and religion. Massive celebrations would occur on a seasonal basis with feasts, wrestling games, singing and dancing. The people lived a nomadic lifestyle until the 1860s, when the fur trade encouraged the growth of forts, trading posts and settlements. However, the people's connection to the caribou is as strong as ever. The town will wait in anticipation for the Porcupine caribou herd to migrate toward them, and grow anxious if the herd is late.
