= Pitkas Point, Alaska =

Pitkas Point Negeqliim Painga
- CDP
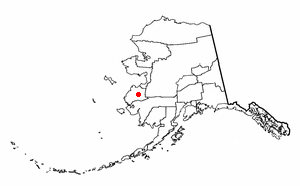
- Location of Pitkas Point, Alaska
- Coordinates: 62°2′8″N 163°15′39″W
- Country: United States
- State: Alaska
- Census Area: Kusilvak

Government
  - State senator: Donald Olson (D)
  - State rep.: Neal Foster (D)

Area
  - Total: 1.61 sq mi (4.16 km^{2})
  - Land: 1.61 sq mi (4.16 km^{2})
  - Water: 0 sq mi (0.00 km^{2})

Population (2020)
  - Total: 120
  - Density: 74.7/sq mi (28.84/km^{2})
- Time zone: UTC-9 (Alaska (AKST))
  - Summer (DST): UTC-8 (AKDT)
- Area code: 907
- FIPS code: 02-60860

Pitkas Point (Central Yupik: Negeqliim Painga) is a census-designated place (CDP) in Kusilvak Census Area, Alaska, United States. As of the 2020 census, Pitkas Point had a population of 120.

== Geography ==
Pitkas Point is located at 62°2′8″N 163°15′39″W (62.035485, -163.260857).

According to the United States Census Bureau, the CDP has a total area of 1.5 square miles (3.9 km^{2}), all of it land.

== Demographics ==
Historical population
Census	Pop.	Note	%±
1940	50		—
1950	84		68.0%
1960	28		−66.7%
1970	70		150.0%
1980	88		25.7%
1990	135		53.4%
2000	125		−7.4%
2010	109		−12.8%
2020	120		10.1%
U.S. Decennial Census

Pitkas Point first appeared on the 1940 U.S. Census as the unincorporated village of "Pitka's Point". In 1950, it returned as Pitkas Point. It was made a census-designated place (CDP) in 1980.

As of the census of 2000, there were 125 people, 30 households, and 24 families residing in the CDP. The population density was 83.9 inhabitants per square mile (32.4/km^{2}). There were 42 housing units at an average density of 28.2 per square mile (10.9/km^{2}). The racial makeup of the CDP was 6.40% White, 91.20% Native American, and 2.40% from two or more races.

There were 30 households, out of which 56.7% had children under the age of 18 living with them, 56.7% were married couples living together, 13.3% had a female householder with no husband present, and 20.0% were non-families. 20.0% of all households were made up of individuals, and 3.3% had someone living alone who was 65 years of age or older. The average household size was 4.17 and the average family size was 4.92.

In the CDP, the population was spread out, with 46.4% under the age of 18, 8.8% from 18 to 24, 26.4% from 25 to 44, 15.2% from 45 to 64, and 3.2% who were 65 years of age or older. The median age was 22 years. For every 100 females, there were 101.6 males. For every 100 females age 18 and over, there were 109.4 males.

The median income for a household in the CDP was $41,875, and the median income for a family was $46,250. Males had a median income of $26,250 versus $21,250 for females. The per capita income for the CDP was $10,488. There were 40.0% of families and 32.2% of the population living below the poverty line, including 33.3% of under eighteens and 57.1% of those over 64.

== Education ==
Until 2012, the Lower Yukon School District operated Pitkas Point School. In the 2011–12 school year, the school had eight students in pre-K through eighth grade. Due to the low enrollment, the town now runs a bus to St. Mary's for K-12 students.
