= Linda Kay Manns =

American model (1965 – 2008)

Linda Kay Manns (formerly Snyder; née Fickus; July 4, 1965 – August 19, 2008) was the first Miss Alaska Teen USA in 1983. She appeared in the first Miss Teen USA Pageant in 1983, which was telecasted from Lakeland, Florida, and was a press favorite.

Born in Fairbanks, Alaska, United States, to William and Lillian Fickus, she was crowned at age 17. She spent much of her childhood growing up on a ranch in the southern foothills of the Brooks Range in the Alaskan "bush". She was the third child of four, and the second daughter in the family to win a state pageant title. Her older sister, Deborah, was Miss Alaska USA in 1980.

Following her year as Miss Alaska Teen USA, she began a career in business and government that ultimately led to political appointments by Alaska Governor Frank Murkowski, whose she served as deputy director of boards and commissions, and as special assistant. She also served in Governor Sarah Palin's Fairbanks office, was president of a local Republican Women's Club, and a member of the Rotary Club. Prior to her death, she appeared as a special guest at the 2007 Miss Alaska Teen USA pageant.

== Personal life ==
Fickus married James Snyder; the couple had two sons. Several years prior to her death, she married secondly, to Jeffrey Manns.

== Death ==
Linda Kay Manns died in Fairbanks, Alaska, aged 43, on August 19, 2008, as the result of a long battle with breast cancer.
