= Twindly Bridge Charter School =

Coordinates: 61°36′52″N 149°26′58″W

Location
- 141 E. Seldon Road; Wasilla, Alaska 99654; United States

Information
- CEEB code: 020389
- Grades: K-12
- Enrollment: 592 (2023-2024)
- Website: www.twindlybridge.us

Twindly Bridge Charter School (TBCS) is a charter school located in the Matanuska-Susitna Borough School District in Wasilla, Alaska. It serves grades K-12. It has an indoor gym that has archery and air pistol shooting. It has classes in yoga and robotics which many other schools lack. It is funded by the State. They have a coffee shop there open weekdays 6:30am–10:00am. Most kids will do their work at home and have grade conferences at the school. There are however supplemental sessions that run k-12 and include: science labs, music, art, pottery, robotics, archery, physical education, and geography. Parents get allotments ranging from $2000-$2500.
