= Nome-Beltz Middle High School =

Coordinates: 64°32′31″N 165°24′21″W

- Nome, Alaska; United States

Information
- Type: Public
- Established: c. 1921
- School district: Nome Public Schools
- CEEB code: 020100
- Principal: Teriscovkya Smith
- Teaching staff: 21.50 (FTE)
- Grades: 6 to 12
- Enrollment: 273 (2024-2025)
- Student to teacher ratio: 12.74
- Colors: Blue and white
- Mascot: Nanook (Polar Bear)
- Website: https://www.nomeschools.org/apps/pages/index.jsp?uREC_ID=3652161&type=d&pREC_ID=2414871

Nome-Beltz Junior/Senior High School is a middle and high-school in Nome, Alaska. It is located at the base of Anvil Mountain, close to the beginning of the Nome-Teller Highway. The mascot is the nanook (nanuq), or polar bear. The school was named in 1965 after William Earnest Beltz (1912–1960), the first president of the Alaska Senate following statehood.

Founded as a boarding school for nearby villages, it is now a public school. The school has recently remodeled much of the original campus, replacing the former cafeteria and gym, among other buildings.

The Alaska School Activities Association classifies Nome-Beltz as a 3A school, just below the largest schools in the state. The school's athletic programs have won several state championships for its division over the past sixty years. Nome-Beltz fields athletic teams for boys & girls basketball, cheerleading, cross-country, swimming, volleyball and wrestling.

Additionally, the school sponsors a school band and choir and hosts numerous student organizations, including Business Professionals of America, National Honor Society, Nome Native Youth Leadership, Future Teachers and Native Youth Olympics.

== History ==
Originally the William E. Beltz School, the school was founded as a boarding high school just outside of Nome, Alaska, for children from the villages of Northwest Alaska. It was built in 1966 by the State of Alaska, using funds from the State, the Bureau of Indian Affairs, and the City of Nome. The school offered a combined academic and vocational curriculum. Vocation-oriented classes include dressmaking, tailoring, library science, cabinetmaking, carpentry, shorthand, typing, metalworking, and auto mechanics. Academic subjects include mathematics, biology, chemistry, English, history, government, art, and economics.

The school initially consisted of an academic building, a dining hall and administration building, a dormitory built for 76 boys and 76 girls (175 students were enrolled in August 1969), a faculty apartment building, and a service building. The dormitory had separate wings for the boys and the girls, connected by common lounges and recreation rooms. There was a tunnel connecting the dormitory, dining hall, and academic buildings.

== Notable alumni ==
- Neal Foster (1990) – Member of the Alaska House of Representatives from Nome since 2009
- M. T. Koyukuk (2002) – Man who sneaked into Disney World wearing parka
