= New Haven High School =

New Haven High School may refer to:

- New Haven High School (Connecticut)
- New Haven High School (Indiana)
- New Haven High School (Michigan), New Haven, Michigan
- New Haven High School (Missouri), a high school in Greater St. Louis

== See also ==
- New Haven (disambiguation)
