= Tenakee Springs School =

School building in Alaska, United States

Coordinates: 57°46′49″N 135°13′09″W

Information
- Closed: 2016
- Staff: 3
- Grades: K-12
- Enrollment: 5 (2016)

Tenakee Springs School is a school building in Tenakee Springs, Alaska, operated by the Chatham School District, that is used to support homeschooling families. In periods prior to 2016 it was a full-service school. The building has three classrooms, a commercial grade kitchen, and a library. Jennifer Canfield of Juneau Empire described it as "a relatively large facility."

== History ==
In 2009 Tenakee Springs School served 13 students in grades K-12 with a staff of 3. The curriculum included topics such as the environment, marine safety, and survival. In 2009 Anne E. Connelly operated the school. Around 2009 due to state policy which only funds rural schools with ten or more students, the school in Tenakee Springs was in danger of closing. By 2009 the school remained open because two families with six children moved to the community after responding to an advertisement of the school, asking for more families, on Craigslist. In 2013 the board voted 4–1 to close the school for one year due to a drop in enrollment. That year the school had three domestic students and two foreign exchange students. The school later reopened. In the 2015–2016 school year it had 11 students, but a family moved away and enrollment declined to five. It closed again in summer 2016 due to the enrollment drop. The district opted to make it a homeschooling resource center to continue supporting families in Tenakee Springs.

== Notes ==
- Some material originated from Chatham School District
