= Ketchikan High School =

Ketchikan High School (KHS)
- Ketchikan High School (left of center) and surrounding neighborhood viewed from a cruise ship in 2009

Location
- 2610 Fourth Avenue; Ketchikan, Alaska 99901; United States; 55°21′12″N 131°40′38″W

Information
- Other name: Kayhi
- Type: Public Secondary
- Motto: "It's good to be a Kayhi King!"
- Established: 1946
- School district: Ketchikan Gateway Borough School District
- CEEB code: 020065
- Principal: Jared Garlick
- Staff: 36.00 (FTE)
- Grades: 9–12
- Enrollment: 516 (2023–2024)
- Student to teacher ratio: 14.33
- Colors: Maroon and white
- Fight song: Kayhi Fight Song
- Mascot: King salmon
- Website: khs.kgbsd.org/en-US

Ketchikan High School, often referred to as Kayhi, is the principal high school for the Southeast Alaska community of Ketchikan and the Ketchikan Gateway Borough School District.

== About the school ==
The Ketchikan High School started as a main school in the downtown part of Ketchikan, offering the first high school program in 1915. In the following years more accredited courses were established.

In 1946 the KHS was officially recognized as a standalone institution besides still being located at the main school. This eventually lead to the creation of the independent Ketchikan School District shortly after.

With the founding of the Ketchikan Pulp Company in 1954 the town grew exponentially, creating the need for more classrooms. Because the building of the main school was to small for the expected amount of students it was transitioned to serve only elementery studens. In 1955 the first part of the current building on Fourth and Madison was finished and opened for up to 750 high school students. To mark this new chapter in KHS history the mascot of the school was changed from the previous polar bear to the current king salmon.

Over the years, the school went through several construction projects before reaching its current form. These changes transformed its overall appearance, most notably the addition of a new building. This new wing is far larger than the original and houses almost all of the current classes. The old building has been converted into a pre-school program, so access for students is restricted in this area. The school's IT department is also based here.

== History behind the schools nickname ==
The nickname "Kayhi" comes from the annual for the KHS which was first published by studens in 1921. The annual yearbooks have beend constantly printed since then (apart from a few gaps during WWII). In 1960, the yearbook was renamed to the name "Williwaw". Over the years the design was changed multiple times until it reached its current state.

Ketchikan Museums List of Yearbooks Original yearbook 1950Yearbook of 2020

The term Kayhi now relates less to the yearbook but the school itself.

== List of available Courses, Clubs and Athletics (2026) ==
=== Courses ===
==== English ====
- Accelerated English I + II (NCAA, APS Equivalent)
- Adventure/ Survival Literature II (NCAA, APS Additional)
- AP English Literature & Composition (NCAA, APS Additional)
- Asian Literature I (NCAA, APS Additional)
- English I + II (NCAA, APS Equivalent)
- Journalism I (NCAA, APS Additional)
- Media Writing - COMM S219 DE (NCAA, APS Equivalent)
- Monster Literature (NCAA, APS Additional)
- Shakespeare (NCAA, APS Additional)
- Sports Literature II (APS Additional)
- Women in Literature (APS Additional)
- English Language Learners (ELL) I + II + III

==== Science ====
- Astronomy Survey (NCAA, APS Additional)
- Biology (NCAA, APS Standard)
- Chemistry I (NCAA, APS Standard)
- Earth Science (NCAA, APS Standard)
- Integrated Science (NCAA, APS Additional)
- Marine Biology (NCAA, APS Standard)
- Medical Terminology
- Physics (Dual-Enrollment w/UAF) (NCAA, APS Standard)

==== Mathematics ====
- Algebra 1(NCAA, APS Standard)
- Algebra 2 (NCAA, APS Standard)
- Geometry (NCAA, APS Standard)
- Math Analysis/Trigonometry (PreCalc) (NCAA, APS Equivalent)
- Personal Finance (APS Additional)
- Pre-Algebra
- AP Statistics (NCAA, APS Standard)

==== Social Studies ====
- AP US History (NCAA, APS Equivalent)
- Alaska Studies (NCAA, APS Standard)
- Civics (NCAA, APS Equivalent)
- Economics (NCAA, APS Standard)
- Psychology (NCAA, APS Standard)
- 20th-Century World History (NCAA, APS Equivalent)
- United States History (NCAA, APS Additional)
- World History (NCAA, APS Standard)

==== Carrer-Technical (CTE) ====
- Carwise A
- General Service Techician 1 (GST1)
- General Service Technician 2/3 (GST2/3)
- Small Engines
- Visual Media & Design
- Yearbook Production & Marketing
- AP Cyber Security
- Computer Science Discoveries
- IT Tech Assistant I/II
- Basic Emergency Medical Technician (EMT) Program (in cooperation with the KFD)
- Stagetech

==== Fine Arts ====
- Drawing and Painting
- Northwest Coast Art
- Sculpture and Pottery
- Concert Choir
- Jazz Band
- Symphonic Band
- Wind Ensemble
- Drama I

==== Physical Education ====
- Boys Conditioning
- Girls Conditioning
- Health
- Physical Education

==== World Language ====
- Italian Language and Culture I (NCAA, APS)
- Italian Language and Culture II (NCAA, APS)
- Spanish Language and Culture I (NCAA, APS)
- Tlingit Language and Culture I (NCAA, APS)
- Tlingit Language and Culture II (NCAA, APS)

=== Clubs ===
- Academic Decathlon
- Concert Choir
- Debate
- GSA
- Jazz Choir
- National Art Honor Society
- National Honor Society
- National Ocean Sciences Bowl Team
- Pep Band
- Pep Club
- Student Body Association
- Yearbook (Williwaw)

=== Athletics ===
- Baseball
- Boys Basketball
- Boys Soccer
- Cheerleading
- Cross Country
- Dance Team
- Girls Basketball
- Girls Soccer
- Softball
- Swim/Dive
- Track & Field
- Volleyball
- Wrestling

== Notable alumni ==
- Elizabeth Peratrovich, Tlingit civil rights activist (Class of 1931)
- Isaac Updike, professional steeplechaser (Class of 2010)
- Rudy Pankow, actor who has appeared in the Netflix series Outer Banks (Class of 2016)

== See also ==
- List of high schools in Alaska
- Ketchikan Gateway Borough School District
- Ketchikan
