= Tongass School of Arts and Sciences =

School in Alaska, United States

Coordinates: 55°20′51″N 131°38′24″W

Information
- Grades: Preschool - Grade 6

Located in Ketchikan, Alaska, the Tongass School of Arts and Sciences (also known as TSAS) is a creative school. It has its own preschool and is available to grades K-6.
