= Pacific Northern Academy =

Location
- 2511 Sentry Drive, Suite 100; Anchorage, Alaska 99507; United States; 61°08′12″N 149°50′00″W

Information
- School type: Private, independent preschool elementary and middle school
- Motto: We educate students to be exceptional learners and independent thinkers of vision, courage, and integrity.
- Established: 1995 (31 years ago)
- CEEB code: 020356
- Head of school: Anna Ramsey
- Grades: Preschool—8
- Enrollment: 130
- Campus type: Suburban
- Colors: Green and yellow
- Mascot: Panther
- Website: www.pacificnorthern.org

Pacific Northern Academy (PNA) is a private, independent school located in Anchorage, Alaska. Founded in 1995, it holds the unique position of being the only non-sectarian, independent day school in Alaska affiliated with the National Association of Independent Schools (NAIS) and the Northwest Association of Independent Schools (NWAIS). Situated in a new facility in south Anchorage, the school serves students from all over the Anchorage bowl, from Girdwood to Eagle River.

Pacific Northern Academy was recently ranked as the 10th best private elementary school in the United States.

The school has also been named as GreatSchool's Parent's Choice for private schools in Alaska.

== Classes ==
Pacific Northern Academy serves 102 students — from 3 year-olds in the Beginners program to eighth grade. PNA has small class sizes — a maximum of 18 students per grade.

The academic program at Pacific Northern Academy includes an emphasis on specialist programs, with all students taking Spanish, visual arts, performing arts, and physical education. The school utilizes Project-based learning in all grades, emphasizing critical thinking and problem-solving as well as community service. The school uses the Responsive Classroom approach to social and emotional learning, focusing on inclusion, individuality, non-punitive correction, kindness, and community-building.

The school has one classroom each for Beginners (3 year olds), Early Kindergarten (4 year olds), and Kindergarten up through 8th Grade. The school plans to add a third preschool classroom in 2018.

Pacific Northern Academy is the home of Create Academy, a STEM and Project-based learning-focused summer camp for students Kindergarten through 8th grade, centered around the school's Makerspace — a dedicated area for building, tinkering, and creating physical and digital products including stop-motion animation, green screen videos, sewing, woodworking, and robotics.

PNA also offers judo, fencing, basketball, and robotics as extracurricular programs.
