= Sitka High School =

Coordinates: 57.0622°N 135.3399°W

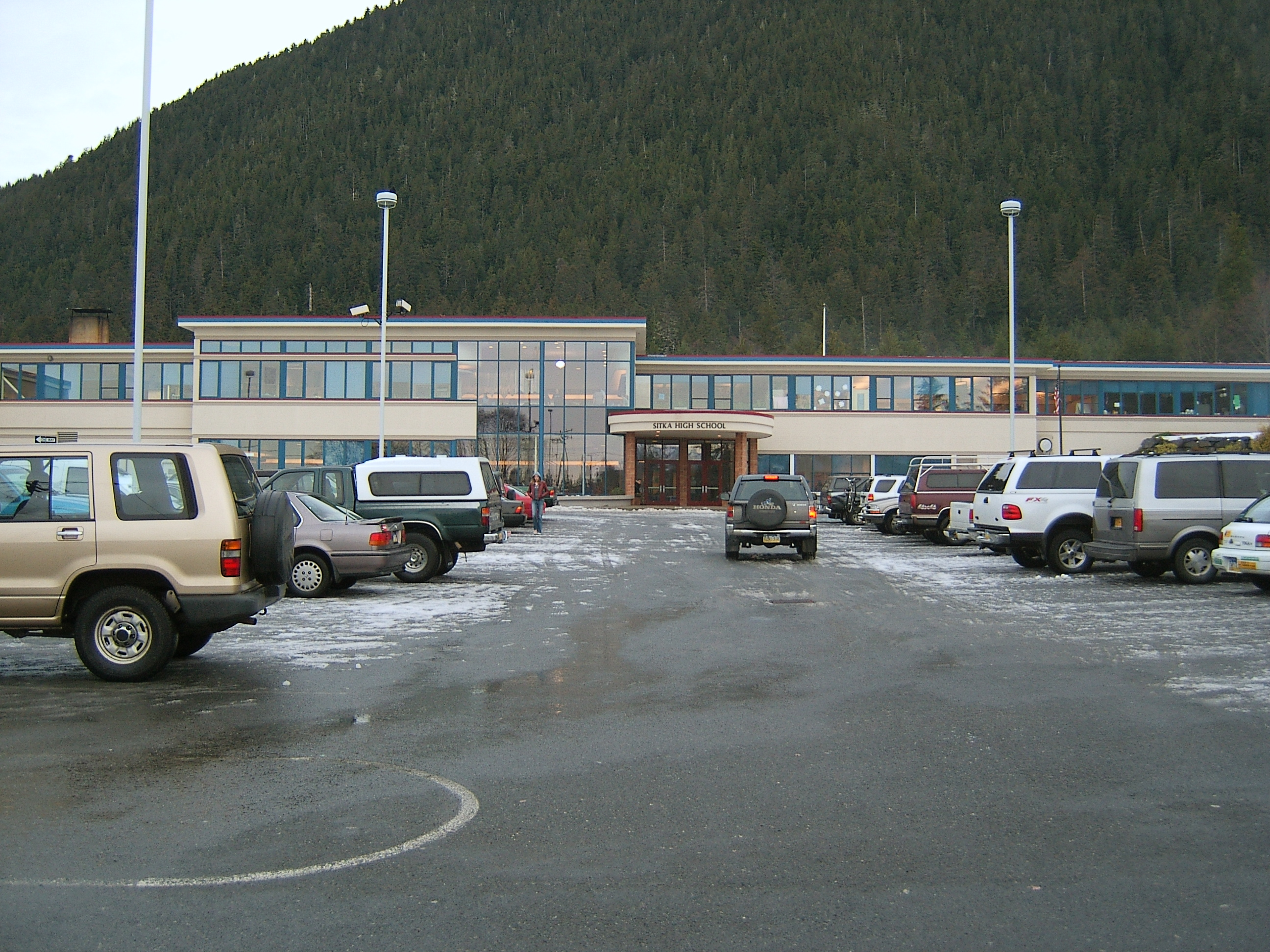
- A picture from the Sitka High School parking lot

Location
- 1000 Lake Street; Sitka, Alaska; United States

Information
- Type: Public secondary
- Established: 1940s
- CEEB code: 020130
- Principal: Sondra Lundvick
- Grades: 9–12
- Enrollment: 335 (2023–2024)
- Colors: Midnight blue, and white
- Mascot: Wolf
- Website: shs.sitkaschools.org/en-US

Sitka High School (abbreviated SHS) is the principal high school for the Southeast Alaskan community of Sitka and the Sitka School District.

The school's student body is primarily composed of Alaskan Native, Asian-Pacific Islander and white students.

== Academics ==
Four Advanced Placement courses are offered: AP Statistics, AP Language and Composition, AP Calculus, AP Literature (offered biannually) and AP Human Geography.

Sondra Lundvick is the current principal.

== Extracurriculars ==
Sitka High School's sports teams are known as the Sitka Wolves with female teams sometimes known as the Lady Wolves. All teams compete at the 3A level of interscholastic competition in Alaska (as dictated by the Alaska School Activities Association), the second highest level of competition available in the state for schools with an enrollment less than 400.

SHS's traditionally most successful sports are softball, baseball, swimming, and wrestling, with the former two claiming state championships in the 2004–2005 school year and with baseball and swimming claiming championships in the 2005–2006 school year. In the 2006–2007 school year, boys' swimming claimed another state championship and the Wolves baseball three-peated, winning their state for the third time in a row. Sitka has also claimed 3 more state titles at the 4A-level in the years 2014, 2017 and 2025. In the past three years, Sitka High School has won the Region V 4A Wrestling championships twice.

SHS is also renowned for its competitive drama, debate, and forensics (DDF) team, which has multiple state championships under its belt, including a forensics state championship in 2005–2006, 2008–2009, and 2009–2010, starting in 2016 and continuing to 2024 the Sitka High DDF team, has gone undefeated. Sitka High is also known for its music program and jazz band, which has taken awards at the Lionel Hampton Jazz Festival and Columbia Basin Jazz Festival.

Sitka High's traditional rivals consist of the boarding school Mt. Edgecumbe High School, which is also located in Sitka (across the O'Connell Bridge on Japonski Island), and its 4A southeast rivals Juneau-Douglas High School and Ketchikan High School. However, the recent change to 3A means the Juneau-Douglas Bears and the Ketchikan Kings no longer compete against the Sitka Wolves for regional and state titles.

As of 2017, the school has an enrollment of just under 350 students, making it the fourth largest high school per enrollment in Southeast Alaska behind Ketchikan High School, Juneau-Douglas High School, and Thunder Mountain High School, the 21st largest in Alaska. Sitka is among the largest of the 3A classified schools in the state.

== Sitka High School Auditorium ==
View from steel girders down onto stage wings and audience chamber of the auditorium under construction (May 11, 2006)

The Sitka High School Auditorium is a 617-seat performing arts facility attached to Sitka High. It functions as a performing center for all performance arts in Sitka from ballet recitals to band concerts.

== 3A switch ==
As of 2007, Sitka High School made the decision to move from 4A to a 3A school because of a decrease in student enrollment over the previous decade. This will affect many activities and sports such as wrestling, basketball, and cross-country. The decision took effect in the 2008–09 school year.

== See also ==
- List of high schools in Alaska
- Mt. Edgecumbe High School
- Pacific High School (Sitka)
