= Tenakee Springs, Alaska =

Tenakee Springs, Alaska Tʼanag̱eey / Tlaagoowu Aan
- City
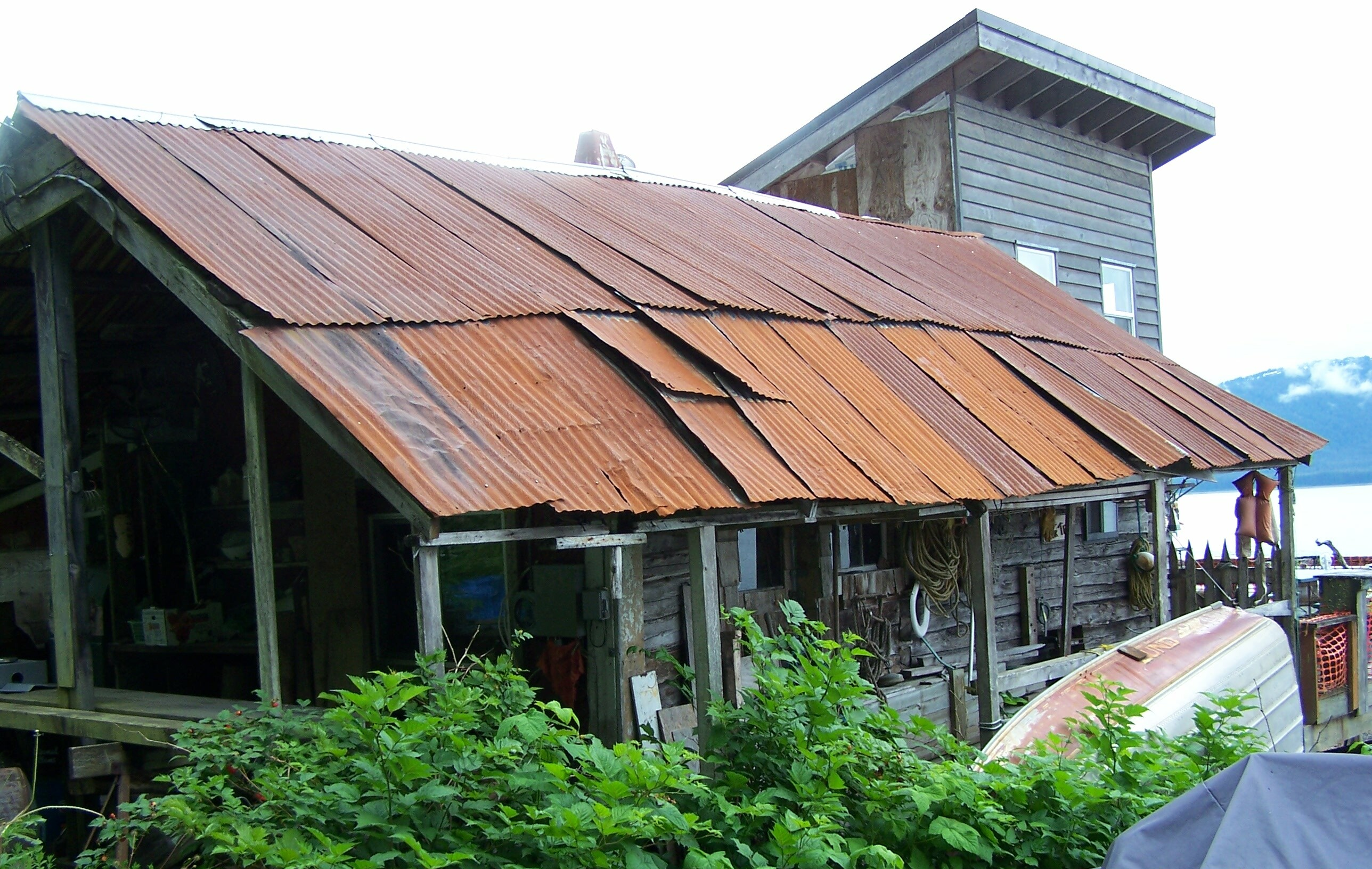
- Building on the Tenakee Springs waterfront

- Location in Alaska
- Coordinates: 57°46′41″N 135°13′11″W
- Country: United States
- State: Alaska
- Census Area: Hoonah-Angoon
- Incorporated: October 26, 1971

Government
  - Mayor: Linnea Lospenosochatel
  - State senator: Bert Stedman (R)
  - State rep.: Rebecca Himschoot (I)

Area
  - Total: 17.91 sq mi (46.38 km^{2})
  - Land: 13.15 sq mi (34.06 km^{2})
  - Water: 4.76 sq mi (12.32 km^{2})
- Elevation: 69 ft (21 m)

Population (2020)
  - Total: 116
  - Density: 8.8/sq mi (3.41/km^{2})
- Time zone: UTC-9 (Alaska (AKST))
  - Summer (DST): UTC-8 (AKDT)
- ZIP Code: 99841
- Area code: 907
- FIPS code: 02-76260
- GNIS feature ID: 1415210
- Website: www.tenakeespringsak.com

Tenakee Springs (Tlingit: Tʼanag̱eey) is a city on Chichagof Island in Hoonah-Angoon Census Area, Alaska, United States. As of the 2020 census, Tenakee Springs had a population of 116.

== Geography ==
Tenakee Springs is located on the northern part of Chichagof Island at 57°46′41″N 135°13′11″W (57.778095, -135.219618), on the north side of Tenakee Inlet, about 10 miles (16 km) west of its mouth in Chatham Strait.

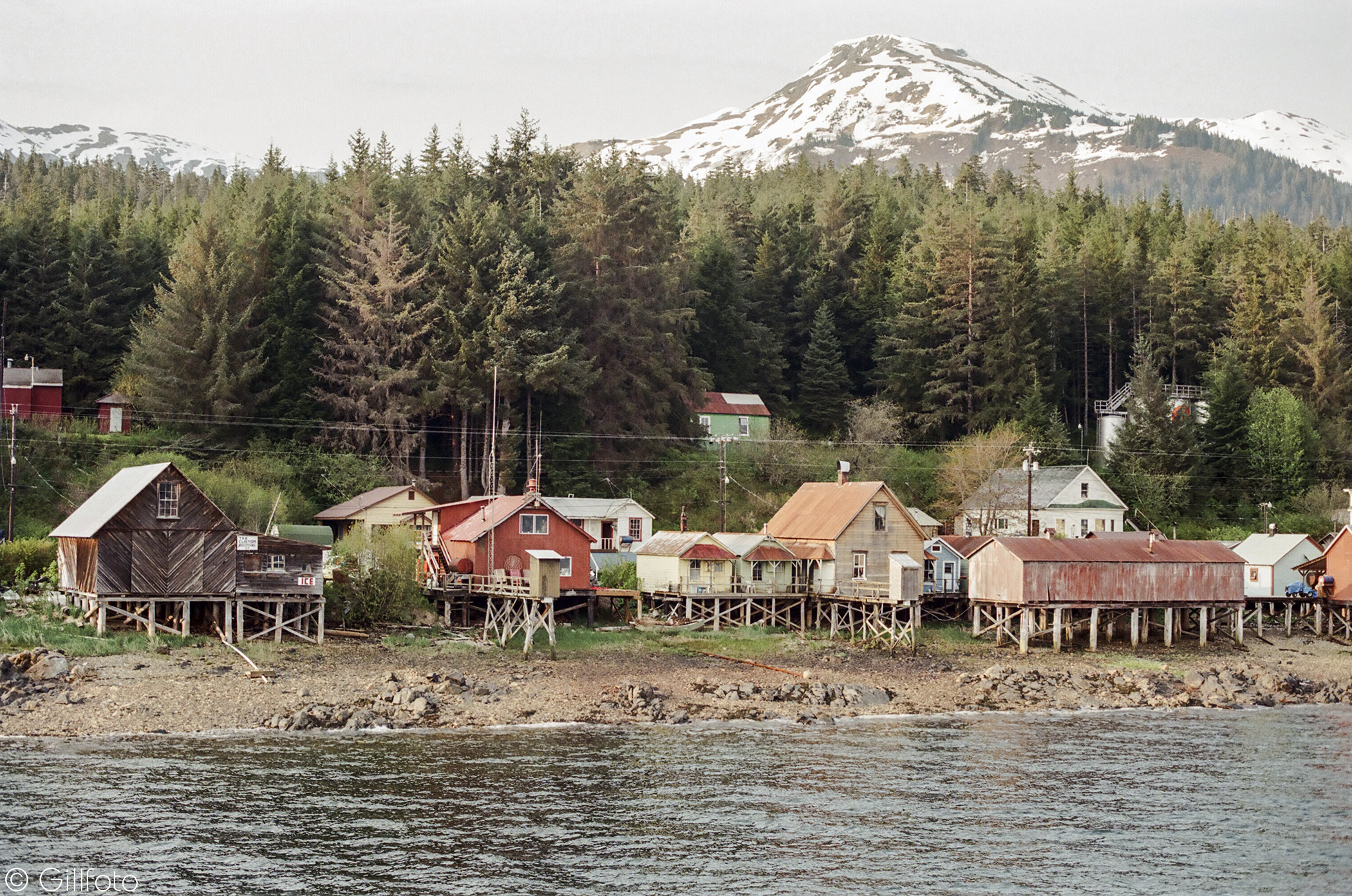
View of Tenakee Springs

According to the United States Census Bureau, the city has a total area of 19.1 square miles (49.5 km^{2}), of which 14.2 square miles (36.7 km^{2}) are land and 4.9 square miles (12.8 km^{2}), or 25.78%, are water.

== Demographics ==
Historical population
Census	Pop.	Note	%±
1910	126		—
1920	174		38.1%
1930	210		20.7%
1940	188		−10.5%
1950	140		−25.5%
1960	109		−22.1%
1970	86		−21.1%
1980	138		60.5%
1990	94		−31.9%
2000	104		10.6%
2010	131		26.0%
2020	116		−11.5%
U.S. Decennial Census

Tenakee Springs first appeared on the 1910 U.S. Census as the unincorporated village of "Tenakee." It reported under that name until 1940. From 1950-onwards, it reported under its present name of Tenakee Springs. It formally incorporated in 1971.

=== 2020 census ===
As of the 2020 census, Tenakee Springs had a population of 116. The median age was 62.2 years. 7.8% of residents were under the age of 18 and 38.8% of residents were 65 years of age or older. For every 100 females there were 100.0 males, and for every 100 females age 18 and over there were 114.0 males age 18 and over.

0.0% of residents lived in urban areas, while 100.0% lived in rural areas.

There were 58 households in Tenakee Springs, of which 13.8% had children under the age of 18 living in them. Of all households, 50.0% were married-couple households, 29.3% were households with a male householder and no spouse or partner present, and 20.7% were households with a female householder and no spouse or partner present. About 39.6% of all households were made up of individuals and 15.5% had someone living alone who was 65 years of age or older.

There were 168 housing units, of which 65.5% were vacant. The homeowner vacancy rate was 7.1% and the rental vacancy rate was 30.0%.

Racial composition as of the 2020 census
Race	Number	Percent
White	100	86.2%
Black or African American	2	1.7%
American Indian and Alaska Native	4	3.4%
Asian	1	0.9%
Native Hawaiian and Other Pacific Islander	0	0.0%
Some other race	2	1.7%
Two or more races	7	6.0%
Hispanic or Latino (of any race)	3	2.6%

=== 2000 census ===
As of the census of 2000, there were 104 people, 59 households, and 28 families residing in the city. The population density was 7.5 inhabitants per square mile (2.9/km^{2}). There were 144 housing units at an average density of 10.4 units per square mile (4.0 units/km^{2}). The racial makeup of the city was 87.50% White, 2.88% Native American, 0.96% Asian, 0.96% Pacific Islander, 1.92% from other races, and 5.77% from two or more races. 2.88% of the population were Hispanic or Latino of any race.

There were 59 households, out of which 16.9% had children under the age of 18 living with them, 39.0% were married couples living together, 5.1% had a female householder with no husband present, and 52.5% were non-families. 47.5% of all households were made up of individuals, and 13.6% had someone living alone who was 65 years of age or older. The average household size was 1.76 and the average family size was 2.46.

In the city, the age distribution of the population shows 13.5% under the age of 18, 5.8% from 18 to 24, 23.1% from 25 to 44, 42.3% from 45 to 64, and 15.4% who were 65 years of age or older. The median age was 47 years. For every 100 females, there were 121.3 males. For every 100 females age 18 and over, there were 109.3 males.

The median income for a household in the city was $33,125, and the median income for a family was $41,250. Males had a median income of $38,125 versus $26,250 for females. The per capita income for the city was $20,482. There were 9.1% of families and 11.8% of the population living below the poverty line, including 10.0% of under eighteens and 33.3% of those over 64.

== Transportation ==
Tenakee Springs is served by the Tenakee Seaplane Base and Alaska Marine Highway.

== Education ==
The Chatham School District operates the Tenakee Springs School, a school building used to support homeschooling families. In periods prior to 2016 it was a full-service school.
