= Valley Pathways High School =

Location
- 1150 North France Rd; Palmer, Alaska 99645; United States
- Coordinates: 61°35′19″N 149°10′02″W

Information
- Type: Public
- School district: Matanuska-Susitna Borough School District
- CEEB code: 020357
- NCES School ID: 020051000425
- Principal: James Wanser
- Teaching staff: 10.00 (on FTE basis)
- Grades: 9–12
- Enrollment: 143 (2024–2025)
- Student to teacher ratio: 14.30
- Website: www.matsuk12.us/vps

Valley Pathways High School is located in Palmer, Alaska, United States. It is an alternative high school, offering small class sizes and close relationships to the teachers. Valley Pathways was created to accommodate the growing number of students attending Burchell High School. At the end of the 2010/2011 school year Valley Pathways had a class size of over 200 students. Although Valley Pathways does not offer an athletic program there are music and extracurricular courses.
