= Lower Yukon School District =

School district in Alaska, U.S

Address
- 100 Airport Road Mountain Village, Alaska, 99632; United States

District information
- Type: Public
- Grades: Pre-K–12
- NCES District ID: 0200003

Students and staff
- Students: 2,027
- Teachers: 128.56
- Staff: 232.46
- Student–teacher ratio: 15.77

Other information
- Website: lysd.org

Lower Yukon School District is a school district headquartered in Mountain Village, Alaska, serving the Kusilvak Census Area. As of the 2017–18 school year, it has 1,998 students across 10 schools. 91% are American Indian or Alaska Native and 5% are multiracial.

== Schools ==
The district operates only K-12 schools due to the small and isolated nature of the villages within the district. Each village has one school. High school students have the option of applying out-of-district to the state's public boarding schools, Nenana Student Living Center and Mt. Edgecumbe High School.

- Alakanuk School (226 students)
- Emmonak School (207 students)
- Hooper Bay School (456 students)
- Kotlik School (179 students)
- Marshall School (119 students)
- Mountain Village School (196 students)
- Nunam Iqua School (64 students)
- Pilot Station School (191 students)
- Russian Mission School (125 students)
- Scammon Bay School (234 students)

High school juniors and seniors may apply to spend nine-week sessions at Kusilvak Career Academy, a residential program that allows students to take career and technical education classes in Anchorage.

=== Former schools ===
Pitkas Point School served eight students in pre-K through eighth grade and shut down after that 2011–12 school year. Students from Pitkas Point are now zoned for Saint Mary's City Schools.
