= New Horizons High School =

Coordinates: 64.043175°N 145.713554°W

Location
- 1680 N Clearwater Ave; Delta Junction, Alaska 99737; United States

Information
- School district: Delta-Greely School District
- CEEB code: 020363
- Principal: Laural Jackson
- Grades: 9–12

New Horizons High School is a small public school in the Delta/Greely School District in Delta Junction, Alaska. It is designed to serve self-motivated students who have sound academic goals and would benefit from the support and guidance of a classroom environment, but who require more flexibility than is possible at a traditional high school. Often, students go to NHHS because they are behind on credits or have circumstances such as health or family issues that make attending Delta High School difficult. NHHS students therefore each have individual graduation plans, and most NHHS courses are paced by the student.
