= Valdez High School =

Location
- 319 Robe River Dr; Valdez, Alaska 99686; United States

Information
- Type: Public high school
- Motto: Home of the Buccaneers
- School board: Valdez City Schools District
- CEEB code: 020150
- Teaching staff: 13.29 (FTE)
- Grades: 9 to 12
- Enrollment: 175 (2024-2025)
- Student to teacher ratio: 13.17
- Colors: Black, white, and Columbian blue
- Mascot: Buccaneer
- Website: www.valdezcityschools.org/vhs

Valdez High School is a high school located in Valdez, Alaska. It is part of the Valdez City Schools District. The school serves students in grades 9 to 12.

Athletics offered include basketball, football, volleyball, wrestling, baseball, cross-country running, swimming, diving, track and field, cheerleading, and cross-country skiing.

== Alumni ==
- Bill Walker- governor of Alaska.
