= Highland Academy Charter School =

Highland Tech Charter School

Location
- 5530 E Northern Lights Blvd; Anchorage, Alaska 99504; United States
- 61°11′38″N 149°46′33″W

Information
- School type: Charter School
- Motto: Leading for Leadership, Leading for Life.
- Established: 2003 (23 years ago)
- School district: Anchorage School District
- CEEB code: 020366
- Principal: Nicole Crosby
- Teaching staff: 8.60 (FTE)
- Grades: 6-12
- Enrollment: 178 (2023-2024)
- Student to teacher ratio: 20.70
- Campus type: Secondary
- Colors: Green and silver
- Mascot: Phoenix
- Website: www.asdk12.org/highlandacademy

Highland Academy Charter School (formerly Highland Tech High School) is a competency-based school in Anchorage, Alaska in the Anchorage School District. It is a charter school whose focus is a learning approach in which all students must demonstrate proficiency in a selection of standards. It was the first standards-based school in the Anchorage School District (ASD) and had its first graduating class on May 31, 2006. Highland Academy is a member of the Reinventing Schools Coalition, which is a division of Marzano Resources. Highland Academy draws its student population from all over the municipality of Anchorage. The curriculum holistically supports a more modern approach to learning, incorporating standards in career development and technology, as well as social, public service, and personal learning. Social-emotional learning is embedded into curriculum in a variety of ways. All students are part of an advisory team where academic coaching, goal setting, team building, and parent connections are focused. Highland Academy was formerly known as Highland Tech High and Highland Tech Charter School.

== ILP Forms and C.O.R.E. ==
Students may choose one or more standards and create an activity or project that addresses these standards. The process is designed to allow flexibility in the learning environment to support anytime, anywhere learning opportunities for students and teaches them critical communication skills as they work with teachers who support their work.

Highland's model for mutual respect is called C.O.R.E. (Culture of Respect for Everyone). The model is designed to engage all stakeholders in an environment of respect. This includes teachers, parents, students, and administrators. To reinforce a culture of respect, Highland uses a conflict resolution tool (the C.O.R.E. form), which encourages both parties to provide their perspective. Highland Academy also celebrates respect on a regular basis through the SuperCORE process.

== Staff ==
Current administration

- Nicole Crosby (principal)
- Katy Bakker (assistant principal)
- Karri Crosson (administrative assistant)

Former principals and assistant principals

- CJ Stiegele (founder)
- Mark Standley
- Rebecca Middles
- Ginger Blackmon
- Laura Hilger
- Michael Shapiro
- Amelia Johnson

== Graduation rates ==
Highland Academy regularly graduates students who are not in their expected graduation year. For example, in 2016 the graduating class consisted of three juniors (all of whom were recipients of the UA Jr Scholars Award) and three fifth-year seniors who benefited from having extra time. These students do not count towards the overall yearly graduation rate and account for misrepresentative data. The majority of students who do not graduate in the expected semester continue on at Highland to complete their graduation requirements.
