= Galena City School District =

School district in Alaska, United States

Coordinates: 64°44′31″N 156°52′08″W

Address
- 299 Antoski Avenue Galena, Alaska, 99741; United States

District information
- Type: Public
- Grades: Pre-K–12
- NCES District ID: 0200130

Students and staff
- Students: 8,168
- Teachers: 102.1
- Staff: 150.7
- Student–teacher ratio: 80.0

Other information
- Website: www.gcsdk12.org

Galena City School District is a school district in Galena, Alaska.

It operates:

- Sidney C. Huntington School (K-8 school)
- Galena Interior Learning Academy (GILA) (9-12, includes a boarding school)
