= Tanana City School District =

School district in Alaska, United States

Address
- 89 Front Street Tanana, Alaska, 99777; United States

District information
- Type: Public
- Grades: K–12
- NCES District ID: 0200715

Students and staff
- Students: 30
- Teachers: 4.0
- Staff: 7.5
- Student–teacher ratio: 7.5

Other information
- Website: web.archive.org/web/20230324185400/https://aktcsd.org/

The Tanana City School District (TCSD) is the school district of Tanana, Alaska. Its sole school, Maudrey J. Sommer School, serves grades K-12.

The school had 104 students in 1998. As of August 2008, the school had five full-time teachers and five aides serving 56 students. By January 2009 the enrollment had declined to 39 students. At the time, many villagers were leaving to find other jobs.

In 2008 the district did not pay $100,000 worth of bills and invoices. Some of the bills had been left over from two years prior. In 2009 John Bania, the superintendent, announced that the school was in $200,000 worth of debt. He stated that he would either stop paying teachers or stop paying bills, unless the State of Alaska gave the district a bailout.

A biomass system is used to power and heat the teacher housing. The school was scheduled to get a biomass heating system started before January 1, 2013.
