= Alaska School Activities Association =

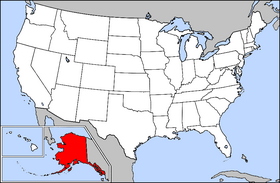
- Abbreviation: ASAA
- Formation: 1957
- Legal status: Association
- Purpose: Athletic / educational
- Headquarters: 4048 Laurel Street #203; Anchorage, Alaska 99508
- Region served: Alaska
- Members: 190+ schools
- Executive director: Billy Strickland
- Affiliations: National Federation of State High School Associations
- Staff: 12
- Website: asaa.org

The Alaska School Activities Association (ASAA) is the regulating body for high school interscholastic activities in the U.S. state of Alaska and is Alaska's member to the National Federation of State High School Associations.

== History ==
The Alaska School Activities Association (ASAA) was founded in 1957 by the territorial board of education, when the need arose for a regulating body in local and regional basketball tournaments. By 1973, separate regions were formed for basketball competition.

By 1987, ASAA became fully independent from state government control or oversight. Currently, ASAA serves as the organizing body for over 190 schools, with a combined enrollment of over 35,000 students. Billy Strickland has been the Executive Director since July, 2014.

The organization is headquartered in the "U-Med District" of Anchorage.

== Classifications ==
Classification (non-football and non-softball)	Number of students	Number of schools at classification
4A	501 and above	23
3A	151-500	27
2A	60-150	35
1A	5-60	106
Classification (football)	Number of students	Number of schools at classification
Division 1	1000 and above	8
Division 2	600-999	8
Division 3	5-599	5

== March Madness - boys and girls basketball tournament ==
ASAA's March Madness state basketball tournament is one of the largest yearly prep sports events in Alaska, mainly because of basketball's unrivaled popularity in rural and urban areas alike. The tournament showcases the eight best teams (selected by region-wide divisional tournaments) from 1A, 2A, 3A, and 4A classifications in standard, separate, two tiered brackets that accommodate 5th place, 3rd place, and championship games.

The tournament, hence the name, takes place usually during the last half of the month of March, and has, at times in the past, taken place during the Anchorage School District’s spring break.

During this event, thousands of people from all over the state of Alaska pour into Anchorage to cheer their respective local teams on, or to simply take in the basketball action. Previously, before the 2006 basketball season, the frenzied tournament action spanned across as many as three different venues in Anchorage over the course of four days with games played from as early as 8 a.m. AKST to late into the evening (sometimes with the final game of the day ending after midnight). However, beginning with the 2006 season and beyond, the tournament format was altered to accommodate week-long, early Monday through late Saturday play with the majority of games at all classifications played at Sullivan Arena. Sullivan Arena, primarily a hockey venue, was reconfigured to contain two full-sized basketball courts for the tournament week. Beginning in 2015, the tournament was moved into the Alaska Airlines Center, which is located on the campus of the University of Alaska, Anchorage.

== High school football ==
The ASAA sanctions high school football at the Division I, Division II and Division III levels.

Each year Alaska holds the first high school game in the nation, held usually around mid-August during summer vacation. Because of this, and the relatively short eight-game season, ASAA state championship football games are played earlier than elsewhere as well, with tournament games taking place in mid-to-late October. The championship games are entitled the First National Bowl.

Currently, 8 teams play at the Division I level in the Cook Inlet Conference, while 8 teams play at the DII classification. There are 5 teams playing in the Division III classification. There is also an unorganized 9-man division with 6 schools actively participating.

The Whalers of Barrow High School are the northernmost high school football team in the United States.

=== First National Bowl ===
The culminating state tournament football games, sponsored by First National Bank Alaska, take place at the Anchorage Football Stadium over the course of two weeks.

Divisions
Division 1	Division 2	Division 3	9-Man
Bartlett Golden Bears	Chugiak Mustangs	Barrow Whalers	Kodiak Bears
Colony Knights	Eagle River Wolves	Homer Mariners	Monroe Catholic Rams
Dimond Lynx	Lathrop Malemutes	Houston Hawks	Nikiski Bulldogs
East Anchorage Thunderbirds	North Pole Patriots	Kenai Central Kardinals	Seward Seahawks
Juneau-Douglas Crimson Bears	Palmer Moose	Redington Huskies	SWDP Archangels
Service Cougars	Soldotna Stars		Valdez Buccaneers
South Anchorage Wolverines	Wasilla Warriors		
West Anchorage Eagles	West Valley Wolfpack		

== Activities ==
ASAA regulates the following interscholastic activities:

- All-State Art Festival
- All-State Honor Music Festival
- Baseball
- Basketball
- Cheerleading
- Cross-country
- Drama, debate, and forensics (serves as the statewide organizing body for the National Forensic League)
- Flag Football
- Football
- Hockey
- Nordic skiing
- Soccer
- Softball
- Solo and Ensemble Music Festival
- Swimming and Diving
- Tennis
- Track and Field
- Volleyball
- World language
- Wrestling

=== AASG ===
ASAA also regulates the statewide student government association, the Alaska Association for Student Government (AASG). This child organization includes about 150 member high schools all across Alaska. Collectively, local AASG programs serve over 25,000 young people in their home schools and statewide. The statewide organization is led by a 16-seat executive board composed of students selected for either one or two-year terms.

== See also ==
- List of high schools in Alaska
- List of school districts in Alaska
- NFHS
