= Calliope Mountain =

Mountain in Alaska, United States

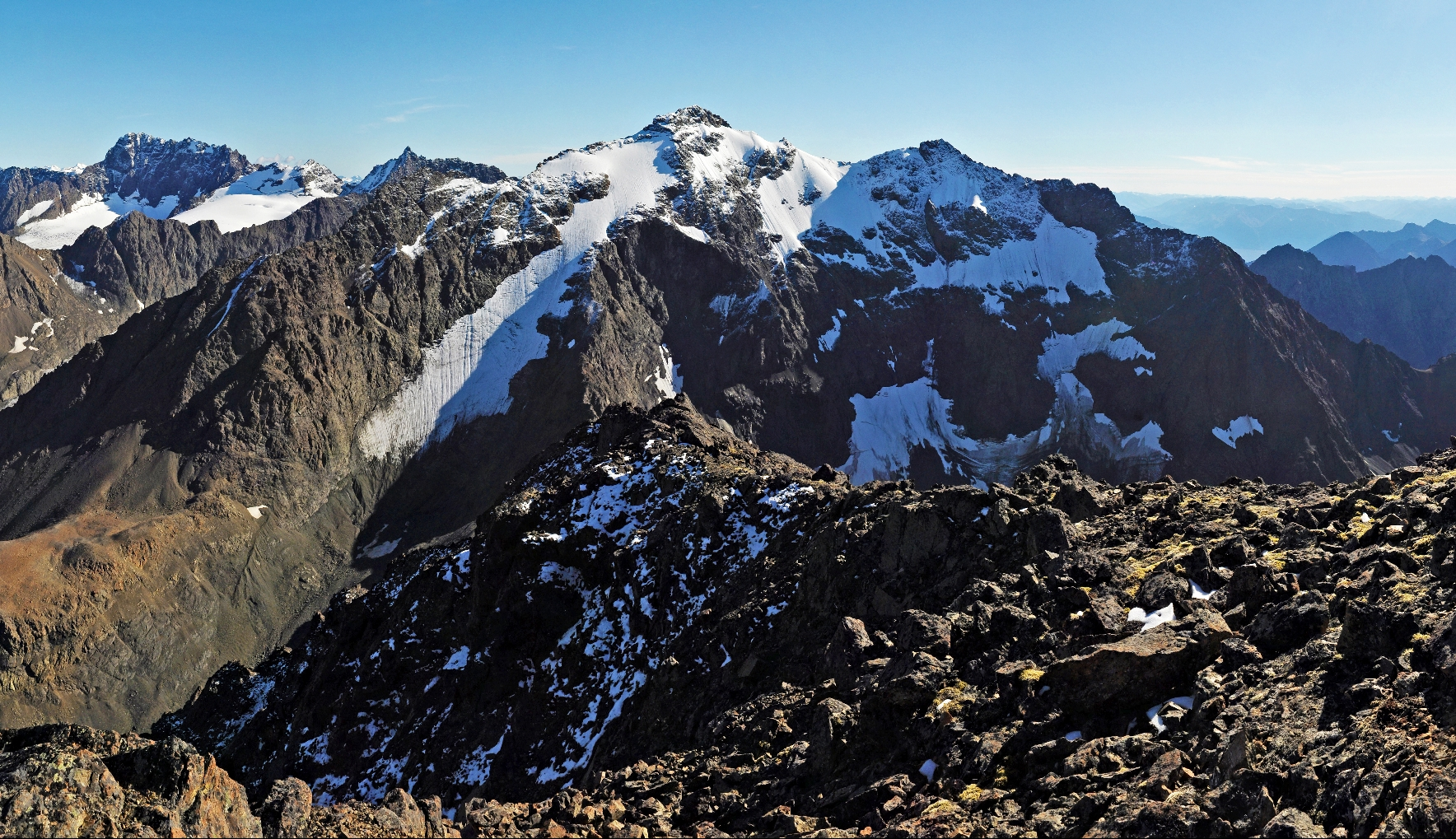
- Northwest aspect, from Cantata Peak

Highest point
- Elevation: 6,821 ft (2,079 m)
- Prominence: 981 ft (299 m)
- Parent peak: Eagle Peak
- Isolation: 2.1 mi (3.4 km)
- Coordinates: 61°08′33″N 149°18′34″W

Geography
- Location within Alaska
- Interactive map of Calliope Mountain
- Location: Chugach State Park; Anchorage Municipality, Alaska; United States
- Parent range: Chugach Mountains
- Topo map: USGS Anchorage A-7

Climbing
- First ascent: 1967
- Easiest route: Scrambling class 4

Calliope Mountain is a 6,821-foot (2,079 m) mountain summit located in the Chugach Mountains, in Anchorage Municipality in the U.S. state of Alaska. Calliope Mountain is situated in Chugach State Park, 20 mi (32 km) east-southeast of downtown Anchorage, and 2.1 mi (3 km) southwest of Eagle Peak, which is its nearest higher neighbor. The first ascent of the peak was made June 24, 1967, by W.E. Hauser and B.P. Hansen, who proposed naming it "Icy Peak", but their fellow members at the Mountaineering Club of Alaska persuaded them to adopt a more distinctive name that would be in keeping with the music theme of the immediate area. Within three miles of the peak there is a Symphony Lake, Concerto Peak, Flute Peak, Triangle Peak, Organ Mountain, Cantata Peak, and Hurdygurdy Mountain. The mountain's calliope name was officially adopted in 1969 by the U.S. Board on Geographic Names.

== Climate ==
Based on the Köppen climate classification, Calliope Mountain is located in a subarctic climate with cold, snowy winters, and mild summers. Temperatures can drop below −20 °C with wind chill factors below −30 °C. This climate supports two small unnamed glaciers on the north slope, and the Flute and Organ Glaciers to the east. The months May through June offer the most favorable weather for climbing or viewing this mountain. Precipitation runoff from the peak drains into tributaries of Eagle River.

== Gallery ==
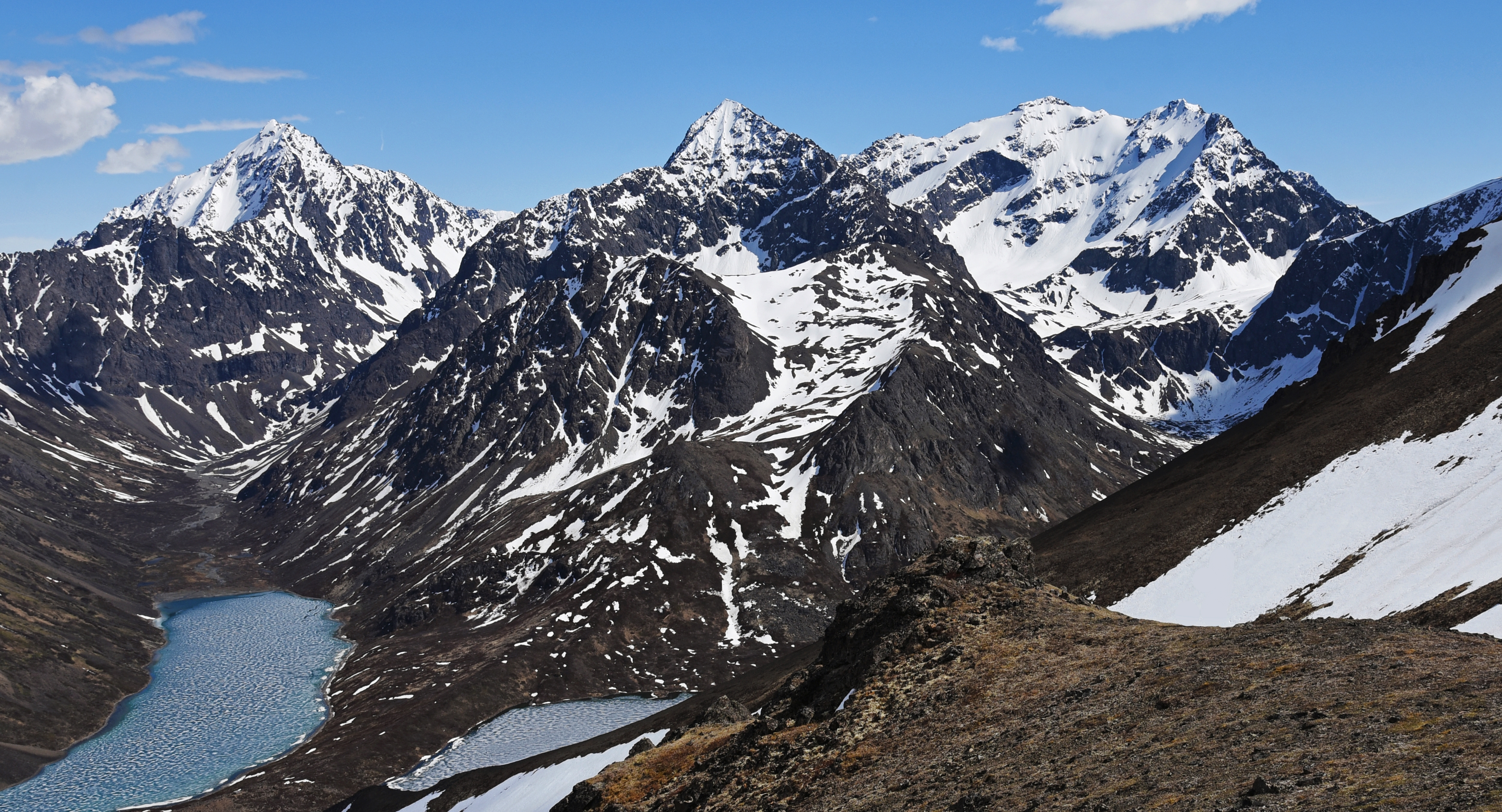
Eagle Peak, Cantata Peak, and Calliope Peak

== See also ==
- List of mountain peaks of Alaska
- Geography of Alaska
