= Brian Niedermeyer =

American football player and coach (born 1988)

Denver Broncos
- Title: Defensive quality control coach

Personal information
- Born: December 28, 1988 (age 37); Eagle River, Alaska, U.S.

Career information
- Position: Tight end
- High school: Chugiak (Chugiak, Alaska)
- College: Glendale (CA) (2007–2008); Butte (2009–2010); Arkansas–Pine Bluff (2011–2013)

Career history

Coaching
- Arkansas–Pine Bluff (2012) Student assistant; Miami (FL) (2013) Defensive analyst; East Texas Baptist (2014) Wide receivers coach; Georgia (2015) Graduate assistant; Alabama (2016) Graduate assistant; Tennessee (2018–2020) Tight ends coach; St. Thomas Aquinas HS (FL) (2021) Assistant coach; IMG Academy (FL) (2022–2023) Defensive coordinator; Tuscaloosa County HS (AL) (2024) Defensive coordinator; Denver Broncos (2025–present) Defensive quality control coach

Operations
- Alabama (2017) Assistant director of recruiting operations

Awards and highlights
- As an assistant coach: CFP national champion (2017)

Brian Niedermeyer (born December 28, 1988) is an American professional football coach and former tight end who is a defensive quality control coach for the Denver Broncos of the National Football League (NFL). He played college football at Arkansas–Pine Bluff.

== Early life and playing career ==
Niedermeyer was born in Eagle River, Alaska and went to Chugiak High School. He earned all-state in football and basketball at Chugiak before going on to play tight end at University of Arkansas at Pine Bluff.

== Coaching career ==
Niedermeyer began his coaching career in 2012 as a student assistant at the University of Arkansas at Pine Bluff, studying defense.

The following year, Niedermeyer took on a volunteer analyst role under linebackers coach Michael Barrow for the Miami Hurricanes football program.

In 2014, Niedermeyer started his first position coach role for East Texas Baptist University as the wide receivers coach. He coached the group to becoming the top passing offense in NCAA Division III that year.

In 2015, Niedermeyer joined the University of Georgia football program as a graduate assistant. There, he worked predominantly with the linebackers group, helping coach and develop Leonard Floyd, Jordan Jenkins, and Roquan Smith.

Niedermeyer then joined the University of Alabama football program, again as a graduate assistant. He worked under then-defensive coordinator Jeremy Pruitt, who would eventually become the head coach of the University of Tennessee. Niedermeyer got promoted to assistant director of recruiting operations in 2017, while also helping coach and develop future professional players Reuben Foster, Tim Williams, and Ryan Anderson.

In December 2017, Pruitt was hired as the head coach of the University of Tennessee Volunteers football program. He hired Niedermeyer as the tight ends coach for the Vols. Niedermeyer quickly went to work recruiting and signing the then nation's No.1 junior college tight end, Dominic Wood-Anderson. Niedermeyer continued his recruiting momentum for the 2018 season by signing multiple top players in the class including Darnell Wright, Quavaris Crouch, and Henry To'oto'o. His efforts earned him the 2019 National Recruiter of the Year by sports media outlets 247Sports.com and ESPN.

In January 2021, Niedermeyer, along with most of the coaching staff at the University of Tennessee, were fired after an internal investigation. Niedermeyer was one of only two assistant coaches who had been with Tennessee football since Pruitt was hired. There were allegations that coaches put money into McDonald's bags and gave them to the recruits when they came on campus.

In 2021, Niedermeyer was named an assistant coach for St. Thomas Aquinas High School.

After one year Niedermeyer was named defensive coordinator for IMG Academy.

In 2024, Niedermeyer took the same position for Tuscaloosa County High School. On December 10, 2024, Niedermeyer was promoted to the head coaching position at Tuscaloosa County High School.

On March 5, 2025, Niedermeyer was hired by the Denver Broncos as a defensive quality control coach; his first coaching position at the professional level.
