= List of middle schools in Alaska =

The following is an incomplete list of middle schools in Alaska:

- Anchorage School District, Anchorage/Eagle River
  - Central Middle School of Science
  - Goldenview Middle School
  - Gruening Middle School
  - Hanshew Middle School
  - Mears Middle School
  - Mirror Lake Middle School
  - Nicholas J. Begich Middle School
  - Orah Dee Clark Middle School
  - Polaris K-12 School
  - Palmer junior middle school Palmer alaska
  - Steller Secondary School
  - Wendler Middle School
- Annette Island School District, Metlakatla
  - Charles R. Leask Sr. Middle School
- Bristol Bay Borough School District, King Salmon/Naknek/South Naknek
  - Bristol Bay Middle/High School
- Copper River School District, Glennallen
  - Glennallen Jr./Sr. High School
- Cordova City School District, Cordova
  - Cordova Jr/Sr High School
- Craig City School District, Craig
  - Craig Middle School
- Dillingham City School District, Dillingham
  - Dillingham Middle/High School
- Fairbanks North Star Borough School District, Eielson AFB/Fairbanks/North Pole
  - Ben Eielson Jr./Sr. High School
  - James C. Ryan Middle School
  - North Pole Middle School
  - Randy Smith Middle School
  - Tanana Middle School
- Galena City School District, Galena
  - Sidney C. Huntington Jr./Sr. High School
- Hoonah City School District, Hoonah
  - Hoonah Jr./Sr. High School
- Juneau School District, Juneau
  - Dzantik'i Heeni Middle School
  - Floyd Dryden Middle School
- Kenai Peninsula Borough School District, Homer/Kenai/Nikiski/Seward/Soldotna
  - Homer Middle School
  - Kenai Middle School
  - Nikiski Middle/Senior High School
  - Seward Middle School
  - Soldotna Middle School
- Ketchikan Gateway Borough School District, Ketchikan
  - Revilla Jr./Sr. High School
  - Schoenbar Middle School
- Kodiak Island Borough School District, Kodiak
  - Kodiak Middle School
- Kuspuk School District, Aniak
  - Aniak Jr./Sr. High School
- Sitka School District, Sitka
  - Blatchley Middle School
