= Comeau =

Comeau may refer to:

== People ==
- Anselm-François Comeau (1793–1867), Nova Scotia farmer, businessman and politician
- Andy Comeau (born 1970), American actor
- Ashley Comeau (born 1984), Canadian actress, writer, and television producer
- Blake Comeau (born 1986), Canadian hockey player
- Carol Comeau (born 1941), American educator
- Chuck Comeau (born 1979), American drummer for Simple Plan
- Ed Comeau, Canadian lacrosse head coach
- Gerald Comeau (1946–2023), Canadian Senator
- Joseph Willie Comeau (1876–1966), Canadian politician
- Josiane Comeau (born 2000 or 2001), Canadian singer
- Joey Comeau (born 1980), Canadian writer
- Laura Comeau (born 1983), Canadian rower
- Marcel Comeau, Canadian ice hockey coach and NHL executive
- Phil Comeau (born 1956), Canadian film and television director
- Rey Comeau (born 1948), Canadian National Hockey League player

== Places ==
- Comeau's Hill, Nova Scotia, a community in Nova Scotia, Canada
- Comeau Building, a building in West Palm Beach, Florida
- Baie-Comeau, a city in Quebec

== Other ==
- Comeau C/C++, a code compiler
