= ERHS =

ERHS may refer to:

== Schools ==
- Eagle River High School
- Eagle Rock High School
- East Rockaway High School
- East Ridge High School (Florida)
- El Rancho High School (Pico Rivera, CA)
- Eleanor Roosevelt High School (California)
- Eleanor Roosevelt High School (Maryland)
- Eleanor Roosevelt High School (New York City)
- Emerald Ridge High School
- Ernest Righetti High School
- École River Heights School
