= Alaska Star =

- Type: Weekly newspaper
- Owner: Binkley Co.
- Publisher: Deedie McKenzie
- Editor: Andrew Jensen
- Headquarters: 11401 Old Glenn Highway Suite 105; Eagle River, AK 99577-7499; United States
- OCLC number: 751394977
- Website: alaskastar.com

The Alaska Star was a weekly newspaper in the Municipality of Anchorage in the U.S. state of Alaska. The Star served communities north of Anchorage proper (known as "the Anchorage Bowl"), including Eagle River, Chugiak and Eklutna. Since 2011, it has been named the Chugiak-Eagle River Star, the paper's original name when it was founded in 1971. In 2018, Morris Communications sold the Star to the Binkley Co., owner of the Anchorage Daily News. The paper closed in 2020.
