= Cantata Peak =

Mountain in Alaska, United States

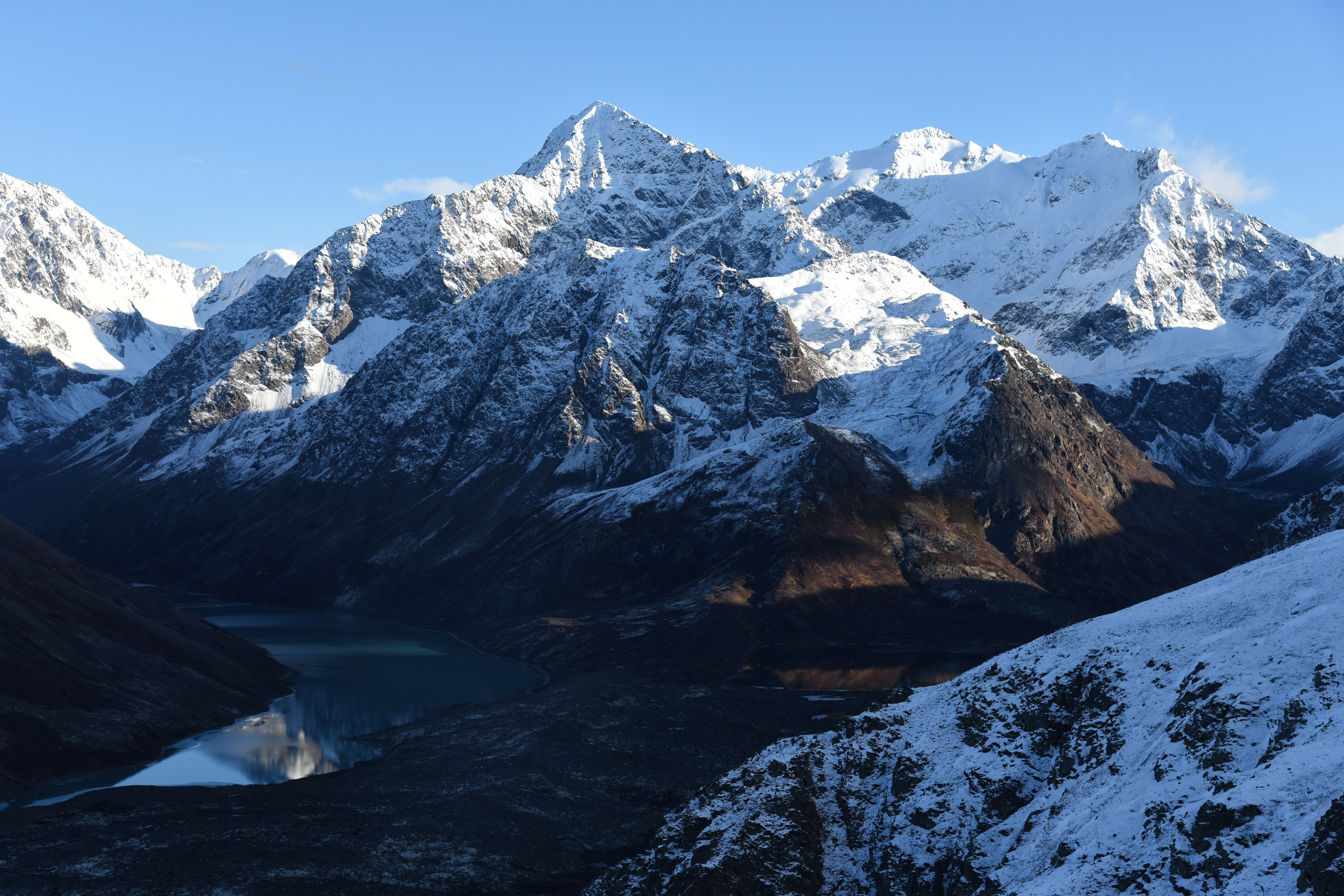
- Cantata Peak seen from northwest

Highest point
- Elevation: 6,391 ft (1,948 m)
- Prominence: 1,076 ft (328 m)
- Parent peak: Calliope Mountain
- Coordinates: 61°09′29″N 149°19′17″W

Geography
- Location within Alaska
- Location: Chugach State Park; Anchorage Municipality, Alaska; United States
- Parent range: Chugach Mountains
- Topo map: USGS Anchorage A-7

Climbing
- First ascent: 1967 by Karen Courtright and Dave Johnston
- Easiest route: Scrambling class 3

Cantata Peak is a 6,391-foot (1,948 m) mountain summit located in the Chugach Mountains, in Anchorage Municipality in the U.S. state of Alaska. Cantata Peak is situated in Chugach State Park, 20 mi (32 km) east of downtown Anchorage, and 1.83 mi (3 km) west-southwest of Eagle Peak. The first ascent of the peak was made August 26, 1967, by Dave Johnston and Karen Courtright. The mountain's cantata name was officially adopted in 1968 by the United States Geological Survey, based on a recommendation by Karen in keeping with the music theme of the immediate area. Within three miles of the peak there is a Symphony Lake, Concerto Peak, Flute Peak, Triangle Peak, Organ Mountain, Calliope Mountain, and Hurdygurdy Mountain.

== Climate ==
Based on the Köppen climate classification, Cantata Peak is located in a subarctic climate with cold, snowy winters, and mild summers. Temperatures can drop below −20 °C with wind chill factors below −30 °C. May and June are the best months for climbing in terms of catching favorable weather. Precipitation runoff from the peak drains into tributaries of Eagle River.

== See also ==
- List of mountain peaks of Alaska
- Geography of Alaska
