= Bill Stoltze =

American politician

Member of the Alaska Senate
- In office January 20, 2015 – January 17, 2017
- Preceded by: redistricted
- Succeeded by: Shelley Hughes

Member of the Alaska House of Representatives
- In office January 21, 2003 – January 20, 2015
- Preceded by: Gretchen Guess
- Succeeded by: redistricted

Personal details
- Born: July 30, 1961 (age 65) Anchorage, Alaska, U.S.
- Party: Republican
- Education: University of Alaska Fairbanks
- Occupation: Former Alaska State Legislature Staff: 1982–2002

Donald William Stoltze (born July 30, 1961) is an American politician. A Republican, he was a member of the Alaska Senate representing District F. He was elected in 2014 after serving since 2003 as a member of the Alaska House of Representatives from the 16th District.

In the House, he served as co-chair of the Finance Committee and was a member of the Legislative Council, the Legislative Budget & Audit Committee, and the Cook Inlet Salmon Task Force. Stoltze was a former legislative aide from 1982 to 2002 before being elected to office. In January 2018, Stoltze was accused by Republican House member, Tammie Wilson, of having bullied her over bills during prior sessions. She said on occasions after she disagreed with him over bills, he yelled and cursed at her, angrily broke a window, and threw things around in his office. Wilson said her complaints were ignored by the Republican leadership and she was told to "just avoid" Stoltze.

In April 2016, a few weeks after a wrongful death suit was refiled by the parents of a woman who had died of withdrawal from drugs on January 10, 2016, in an Anchorage jail, Stoltz said he would not run for reelection to his Senate seat. He cited health problems as the reason. Her parents believed he had supplied her with money she spent on drugs and also said their daughter had said she believed she was being stalked by him. Stoltze had visited the woman during her first evening in jail, according to visitor logs and surveillance video released as a result of the wrongful-death claim. She asked him to pay her bail. He responded: “Well, I hate having my, you know, my name there on CourtView and everything on that stuff, you know what I mean?” Stoltze told her, referring to Alaska's on-line court database. “You’re listed as a poster there when you secure the bond.” He offered to give the woman's mother money for bail if the prisoner could reach her. Stoltze never called her mother regarding bail or to inform her that her daughter was very ill. Her mother said, “I wish he would have called.”

After taking office on December 3, 2018, Alaska Governor Mike Dunleavy hired Stoltze to run his office in the Mat-Su Borough, but Stoltze resigned from the position on December 21, 2018.

== Personal life ==
Stoltze graduated from Chugiak High School in 1979 and received a Bachelor of Arts in political science from the University of Alaska Fairbanks in 1984. He lives in Chugiak.
