= Cantata (disambiguation) =

Cantata is a genre of vocal music. It may also refer to:

- Cantata (film), a 1963 Hungarian film
- Cantata (software), Music Player Daemon client
- Cantata (Stravinsky), a 1950s composition by Igor Stravinsky
- Cantata++, software to test programs written in C and C++
- Cantata 140, a.k.a. The Crack in Space, a 1960s science fiction novel(la) by Philip K. Dick
- Cantata 700, a commercial background music system
- Cantata Peak, a mountain summit in Alaska
- Church cantata, a.k.a. sacred cantata, religious subset of the cantata genre

== See also ==
- Category:Cantatas
