= Quinnipiac Bobcats men's ice hockey =

College ice hockey program

- Current season
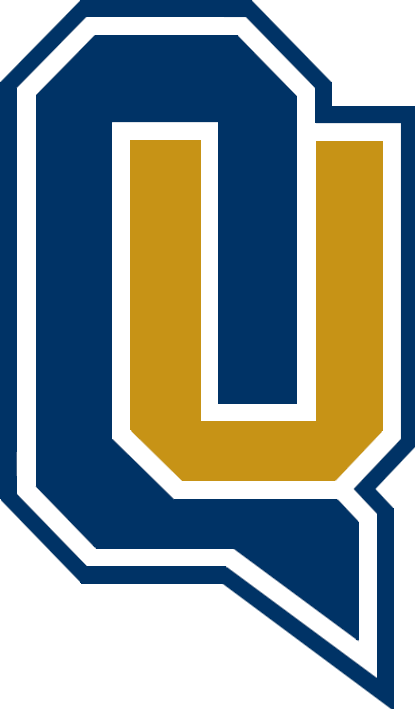
- University: Quinnipiac University
- Conference: ECAC Hockey
- Head coach: Rand Pecknold; 32nd season, 693–369–110 (.638)
- Assistant coaches: Joe Dumais; Castan Sommer; Justin Eddy
- Arena: Frank Perrotti, Jr. Arena at the M&T Bank Arena; Hamden, Connecticut
- Colors: Navy and gold
- Mascot: Boomer the Bobcat

NCAA tournament champions
- 2023

NCAA tournament runner-up
- 2013, 2016

NCAA tournament Frozen Four
- 2013, 2016, 2023

NCAA tournament appearances
- 2002, 2013, 2014, 2015, 2016, 2019, 2021, 2022, 2023, 2024, 2025, 2026

Conference tournament champions
- MAAC: 2002; ECAC: 2016

Conference regular season champions
- MAAC: 1999, 2000; AHA: 2005; ECAC: 2013, 2015, 2016, 2019, 2021, 2022, 2023, 2024, 2025, 2026

Current uniform

The Quinnipiac Bobcats men's ice hockey team is a National Collegiate Athletic Association (NCAA) Division I college ice hockey program that represents Quinnipiac University. The Bobcats are a member of ECAC Hockey. They play at the M&T Bank Arena in Hamden, Connecticut.

== History ==
Quinnipiac College began sponsoring men's ice hockey as a varsity sport for the 1975–76 season. The program began as an independent team before joining ECAC 3 the following year. The program remained with the third-tier conference for over 20 years despite being a Division II school for much of that time. The Braves left ECAC 3 in 1997 and spent a year as a D-II independent before moving up to Division I as part of the university's transition to the top level. Quinnipiac was a founding member of the Metro Atlantic Athletic Conference ice hockey division, joining the conference as an affiliate member. The Braves won the MAAC Regular season Championship in their first season in the league. The trend continued as Quinnipiac won the title the follow two seasons. In 2002 The Braves won the team's first playoff series, winning the MAAC Playoff Championship with a 6–4 win over Mercyhurst. With the win, Quinnipiac received an automatic bid to the 2002 NCAA Division I men's ice hockey tournament, the first NCAA postseason appearance in program history. Quinnipiac faced off against Cornell in the first round of the East Regional, held in Worcester, Massachusetts. Quinnipiac's run into the NCAA tournament ended early in a 1–6 loss to the Big Red. The game was the first NCAA tournament appearance for the Braves. Quinnipiac finished the 2001–02 season 20–13–5, marking the team's fourth consecutive season with at least 20 wins.

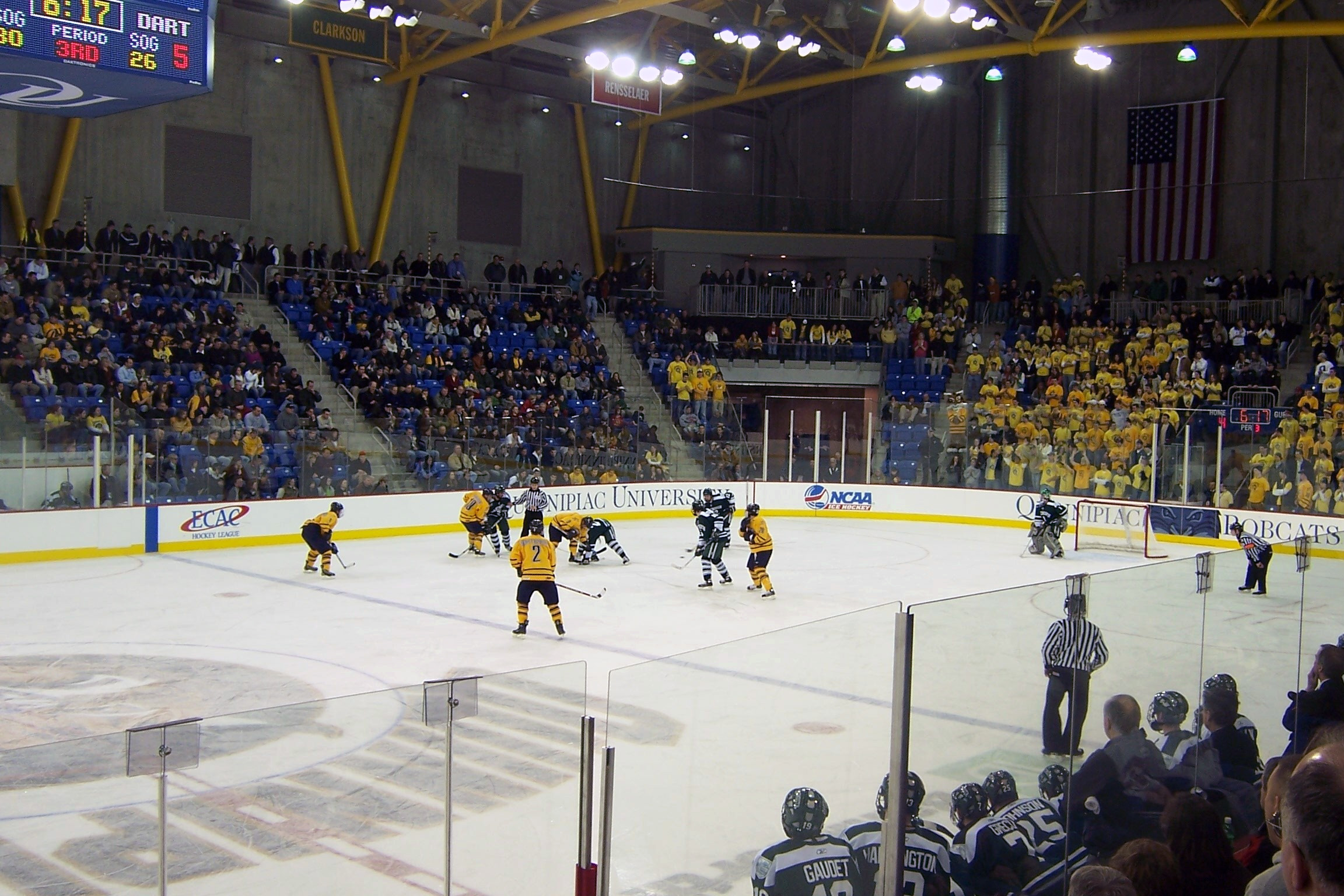
The Quinnipiac Bobcats men's ice hockey team battles Dartmouth College at the then-named TD Banknorth Sports Center, February 2007. Quinnipiac student section is on right.

In 2003 the MAAC Hockey league split off from the main athletic conference to form Atlantic Hockey. After two years in Atlantic Hockey Quinnipiac left to join the ECAC, replacing Vermont who left the league for Hockey East and changed their name to the Bobcats. QU was chosen over a number of applicants in large part to the university's commitment to build a new multipurpose sports arena to replace the civic-owned Northford Ice Pavilion. The Bobcats moved into the new 3,386-seat TD Bank Sports Center (then known as TD Banknorth Sports Center) in 2007.

The 2012–13 season has brought Quinnipiac to national prominence. The program reached a new high becoming the number one team in the country on February 11, 2013 in both the USCHO.com poll and USA Today College Hockey poll. Quinnipiac retained the ranking the following week despite losing their first game as the top ranked team to St. Lawrence University as the 2nd and 3rd ranked teams also fell the same weekend. The Bobcats also won their first ever Cleary Cup presented to the ECAC regular season champion. On March 24, 2013, the Bobcats received the number one overall seed in the 2013 NCAA Division I men's ice hockey tournament. The Bobcats won the East Region with wins over Canisius (4-3) and Union (5-1) to advance to the school's first ever Frozen Four in Pittsburgh, Pa. In the national semifinals, Quinnipiac defeated St. Cloud State (4-1) to advance to the national championship game against archrival Yale. The Bobcats fell 4–0 to Yale to end the 2012-13 as the national runner-up.

In the 2013–14 season the Bobcats once again reached the NCAA tournament yet were defeated in the first round by Providence College 4–0. The team finished the season with a 24-10-6 record.

Quinnipiac once again had a successful 2014–15 season when they won their second ECAC regular season title in 3 years but lost in the first round of the NCAA tournament to North Dakota 4–1. The team finished the season with a 23-12-4 record.

The 2015–16 season saw Qunnipiac set a school record for wins with 32 along with winning their 3rd ECAC regular season title in 4 years and winning the ECAC tournament championship for the first time. Quinnipiac blew through the East Regional with wins over RIT 4-0 and UMass Lowell 4–1 to capture the regional championship and advance to the Frozen Four in the Tampa for the 2nd time in 4 seasons. In the national semifinals the Bobcats withheld a late charge by Boston College to win 3-2 and advance to the second national championship game in program history. Once again Quinnipiac was denied a national championship this time at the hands of North Dakota in a 5–1 defeat. The team finished the season with a record of 32-4-7.

On April 8, 2023, the Bobcats won their first-ever NCAA Division I men's ice hockey tournament championship, defeating the Minnesota Golden Gophers 3–2, as sophomore forward Jacob Quillan scored the title-winning goal just ten seconds into overtime.

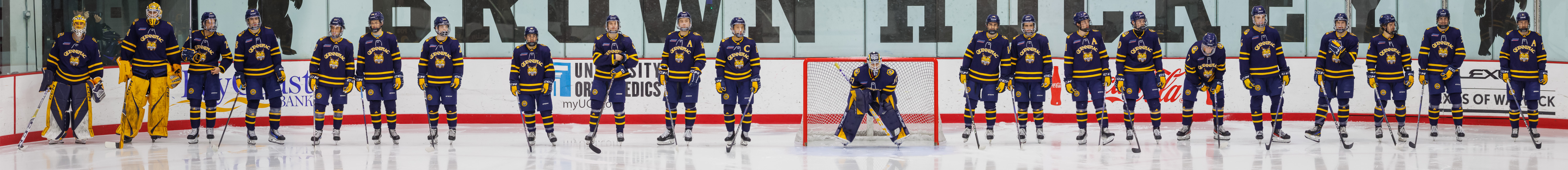
2023-2024 Quinnipiac Bobcats at Brown's Meehan Auditorium

== Rivals ==
Since moving to the ECAC, Quinnipiac's biggest rival has been the Yale Bulldogs. The rivalry is dubbed the War on Whitney Avenue as the two campuses are separated by a mere 8 miles on Whitney Avenue in Hamden, Connecticut, to New Haven, Connecticut. The rivalry has reached its highest point in 2013 as both the Bobcats and the Bulldogs rank in the top 10 nationally and are 1 and 2 in the ECAC standings. The winner of the final game between the two teams receives the Heroes Hat which honors those who risked their lives during the September 11, 2001 terrorist attacks. The two teams met on April 13, 2013 for the fourth time in the 2012–13 season in Pittsburgh, Pennsylvania to play for the national championship. Quinnipiac won the previous three meetings by a combined score of 13–3, but was upset in the national championship game, 4–0.

The Cornell Big Red have also become a rival of Quinnipiac with the teams meeting in five ECAC Hockey Playoff series since the 2007 season having won in 2007 at Lynah Rink and in 2013 and 2016 in Hamden with the latter two coming with Quinnipiac as the ECAC number one seed and seasons in which Quinnipiac reached the Frozen Four. Cornell won series in 2011 and 2018 both at Lynah Rink. The Bobcats and Big Red met in the 2025 ECAC Semifinals in Lake Placid with Cornell coming out on top 3-2 in overtime. Quinnipiac is 3–2 in those series against Cornell with three of the series going the maximum three games. Things on the ice have been heated at times with a lot of physical play and both Rand Pecknold and Cornell head coach Mike Schafer jawing at each other as well.

== Records vs. current ECAC Hockey teams ==
As of the completion of 2025–26 season

School	Team	Away Arena	Overall record	Win %	Last Result
Brown University	Bears	Meehan Auditorium	37–10–7	.750	-
Clarkson University	Golden Knights	Cheel Arena	22–22–7	.500	-
Colgate University	Raiders	Class of 1965 Arena	36–22–3	.615	-
Cornell University	Big Red	Lynah Rink	22–29–6	.439	-
Dartmouth College	Big Green	Thompson Arena	30–12–4	.696	-
Harvard University	Crimson	Bright-Landry Hockey Center	23–19–5	.543	-
Princeton University	Tigers	Hobey Baker Memorial Rink	29–12–1	.702	-
Rensselaer Polytechnic Institute	Engineers	Houston Field House	30–8–9	.734	-
St. Lawrence University	Saints	Appleton Arena	32–19–6	.614	-
Union College	Dutchmen	M&T Bank Center	29–18–5	.606	-
Yale University	Bulldogs	Ingalls Rink	36–9–5	.770	-

== Season-by-season results ==
Source:

== All-time coaching records ==
Coaches

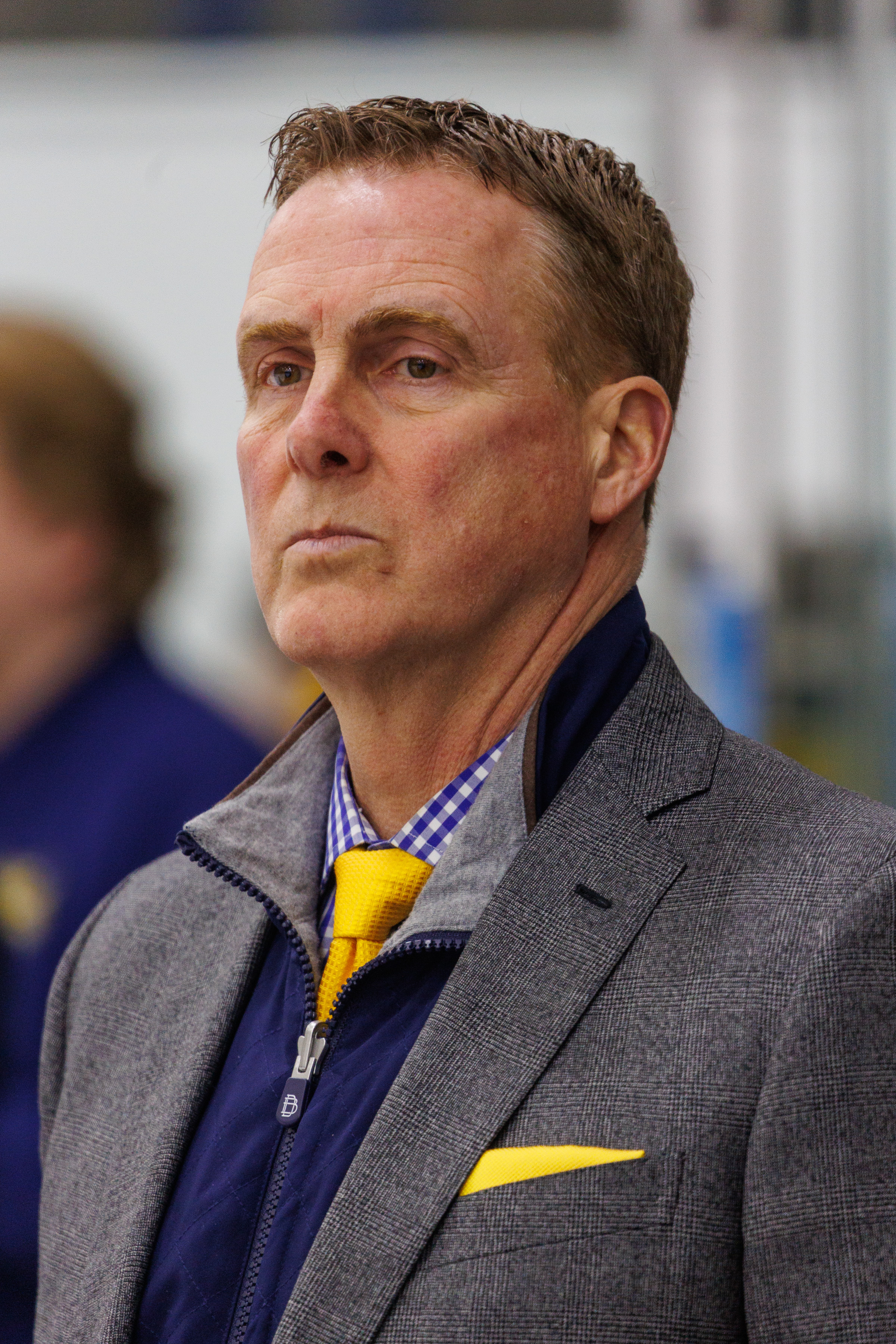
Rand Pecknold
Head Coach

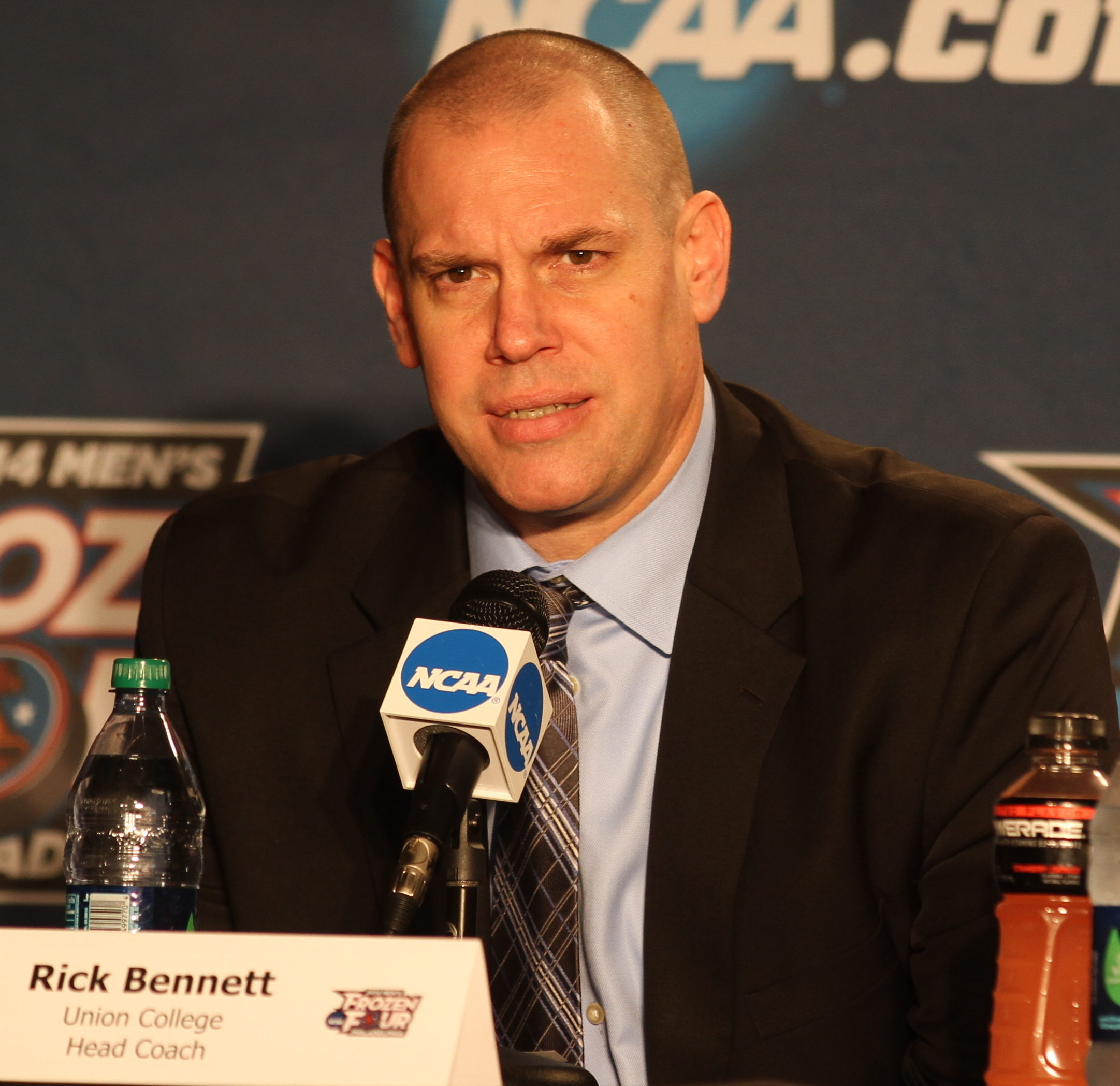
Rick Bennett
Assistant Coach

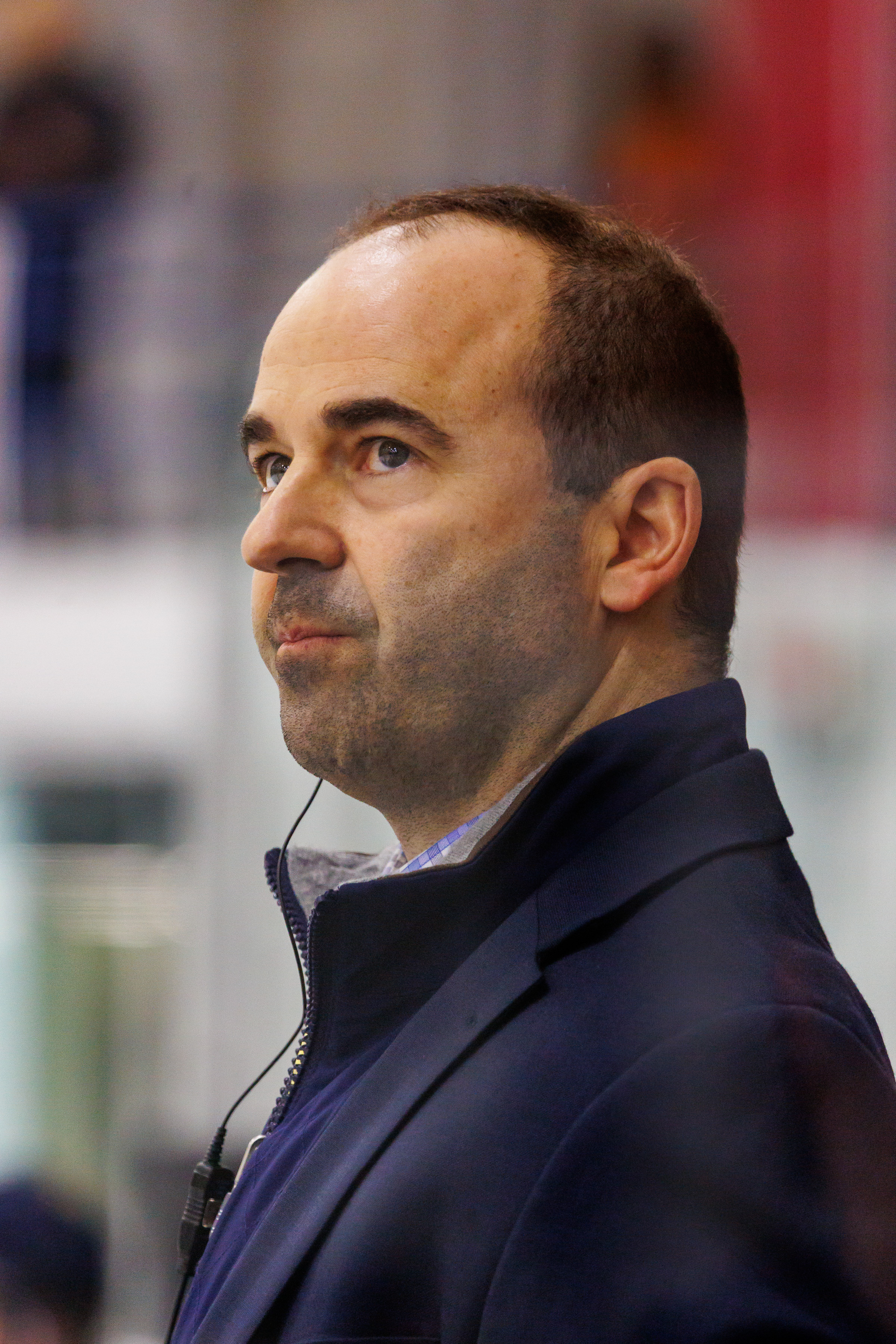
Joe Dumais
Associate Head Coach

As of 2024–2025 season

As of completion of 2024–25 season

Tenure	Coach	Years	Record	Pct.
1975–1979	Jim Kennedy	4	22–48–1	.317
1979–1980	Ralph O'Connor	1	5–13–1	.289
1980–1994	Jim Armstrong	14	139–188–8	.427
1994–Present	Rand Pecknold	32	693–369–110	.638
Totals	4 coaches	50 Seasons	832–608–117	.572

== Statistical leaders ==
=== Career points leaders ===
Player	Years	GP	G	A	Pts	PIM
Chris Cerrella	1997–2001	126	99	106	205	230
Todd Johnson	1985–1989	109	90	112	202	128
Jim Hanscom	1976–1980		83	109	192	
Bill Verneris	1978–1982		92	94	186	
Brian Herbert	1999–2003	136	56	113	169	254
Bryan Leitch	2005–2009	157	53	116	169	124
Odeen Tufto	2017–2021	139	39	129	168	58
Rick Ciardiello	1983–1987		61	97	158	
Reid Cashman	2003–2007	151	23	125	148	246
Ethan De Jong	2018–2023	184	61	83	144	76

=== Career goaltending leaders ===
GP = Games played; Min = Minutes played; W = Wins; L = Losses; T = Ties; GA = Goals against; SO = Shutouts; SV% = Save percentage; GAA = Goals against average

Minimum 30 games

Player	Years	GP	Min	W	L	T	GA	SO	SV%	GAA
Yaniv Perets	2020–2023	74	4291	56	9	5	137	21	.935	1.34
Michael Garteig	2012–2016	124	7261	78	25	16	237	19	.917	1.96
Eric Hartzell	2009–2013	106	6139	58	27	17	201	10	.924	1.96
Andrew Shortridge	2016–2019	78	4235	42	26	4	139	10	.923	1.97
Keith Petruzzelli	2017–2021	94	5280	51	27	8	191	10	.915	2.17

Statistics current through the start of the 2023–24 season.

== Roster ==
As of September August 9, 2025.

No.	Nat.	Player	Class	Pos	Height	Weight	DoB	Hometown	Previous team	NHL rights
2	(Canada)	Drew Hockley	Sophomore	D	6' 3" (1.91 m)	190 lb (86 kg)	2005-03-03	Kentville, Nova Scotia	Victoria Grizzlies (BCHL)	—
3	(United States)	William Gilson	Senior	D	6' 0" (1.83 m)	170 lb (77 kg)	2001-06-28	Old Greenwich, Connecticut	Rensselaer (ECAC)	—
4	(Canada)	Logan McCutcheon	Freshman	D	5' 9" (1.75 m)	161 lb (73 kg)	2004-01-29	Saskatoon, Saskatchewan	Lethbridge Hurricanes (WHL)	—
5	(United States)	Brady Schultz	Freshman	D	5' 11" (1.8 m)	194 lb (88 kg)	2004-07-23	Monroe, Connecticut	Halifax Mooseheads (QMJHL)	—
6	(United States)	Charlie Leddy	Senior	D	6' 2" (1.88 m)	185 lb (84 kg)	2004-01-11	Fairfield, Connecticut	Boston College (HEA)	NJD, 126th overall 2022
7	(United States)	Elliott Groenewold	Sophomore	D	6' 2" (1.88 m)	201 lb (91 kg)	2006-02-04	Bellows Falls, Vermont	Cedar Rapids RoughRiders (USHL)	BOS, 110th overall 2024
8	(United States)	Matthew McGroarty	Junior	F	5' 10" (1.78 m)	172 lb (78 kg)	2003-01-30	Westport, Connecticut	Madison Capitols (USHL)	—
10	(United States)	Tyler Borgula	Sophomore	F	5' 9" (1.75 m)	170 lb (77 kg)	2005-10-06	Livonia, Michigan	Sioux Falls Stampede (USHL)	—
11	(United States)	Aaron Schwartz	Sophomore	F	5' 11" (1.8 m)	174 lb (79 kg)	2004-03-22	Parkland, Florida	Surrey Eagles (USHL)	—
12	(United States)	Markus Vidicek	Freshman	F	5' 10" (1.78 m)	172 lb (78 kg)	2004-03-21	Montréal, Quebec	Moncton Wildcats (QMJHL)	—
14	(United States)	Victor Czerneckianair	Senior	F	5' 11" (1.8 m)	174 lb (79 kg)	2002-02-17	Southington, Connecticut	Tri-City Storm (USHL)	—
16	(United States)	Jeremy Wilmer	Senior	F	5' 8" (1.73 m)	155 lb (70 kg)	2003-08-16	Rockville Centre, New York	Boston University (HEA)	—
17	(Canada)	Ben Riche	Freshman	F	5' 11" (1.8 m)	181 lb (82 kg)	2005-03-15	Bethune, Saskatchewan	Prince George Cougars (WHL)	—
18	(United States)	Anthony Cipollone	Senior	F	5' 6" (1.68 m)	165 lb (75 kg)	2002-05-14	Purchase, New York	Brooks Bandits (AJHL)	—
19	(United States)	Ethan Wyttenbach	Freshman	F	5' 10" (1.78 m)	181 lb (82 kg)	2007-02-10	Roslyn, New York	Sioux Falls Stampede (USHL)	CGY, 144th overall 2025
20	(Canada)	Mason Marcellus	Junior	F	5' 9" (1.75 m)	165 lb (75 kg)	2002-07-19	Greely, Ontario	Lincoln Stars (USHL)	—
22	(Canada)	Braden Blace	Sophomore	D	6' 3" (1.91 m)	190 lb (86 kg)	2003-09-09	Duncan, British Columbia	Alberni Valley Bulldogs (BCHL)	—
23	(United States)	Antonin Verreault	Freshman	F	5' 8" (1.73 m)	170 lb (77 kg)	2004-07-28	Mirabel, Quebec	Rouyn-Noranda Huskies (QMJHL)	—
24	(Canada)	Alex Power	Senior	F	6' 1" (1.85 m)	185 lb (84 kg)	2002-01-04	St. John's, Newfoundland and Labrador	Bonnyville Pontiacs (AJHL)	—
25	(Canada)	Nate Tivey	Freshman	D	6' 5" (1.96 m)	205 lb (93 kg)	2004-03-27	Burlington, Ontario	Saint John Sea Dogs (QMJHL)	—
26	(United States)	Matthew Lansing	Freshman	F	6' 1" (1.85 m)	185 lb (84 kg)	2007-02-24	Tonawanda, New York	Fargo Force (USHL)	VAN, 207th overall 2025
27	(United States)	Andon Cerbone	Junior	F	5' 9" (1.75 m)	163 lb (74 kg)	2004-04-13	Stamford, Connecticut	Youngstown Phantoms (USHL)	—
28	(United States)	Chris Pelosi	Sophomore	F	6' 1" (1.85 m)	181 lb (82 kg)	2005-03-05	Sewell, New Jersey	Sioux Falls Stampede (USHL)	BOS, 92nd overall 2023
29	(United States)	Dylan Silverstein	Sophomore (RS)	G	6' 0" (1.83 m)	179 lb (81 kg)	2004-02-07	Calabasas, California	Sioux City Musketeers (USHL)	—
31	(United States)	Sam Scopa	Freshman	G	6' 0" (1.83 m)	181 lb (82 kg)	2005-01-10	Lexington, Massachusetts	Madison Capitols (USHL)	—
33	(Slovakia)	Matej Marinov	Junior	G	6' 0" (1.83 m)	157 lb (71 kg)	2003-06-16	Nitra, Slovakia	Fargo Force (USHL)	—

== Awards and honors ==
=== NCAA ===
==== Individual awards ====
Spencer Penrose Award

- Rand Pecknold: 2016

Tim Taylor Award

- Sam Anas: 2014
- Ethan Wyttenbach: 2026

NCAA Scoring Champion

- Bryan Leitch: 2009

==== All-Americans ====
AHCA First Team All-Americans

- 2006–07: Reid Cashman, D
- 2012–13: Eric Hartzell, G
- 2015–16: Sam Anas, F
- 2020–21: Odeen Tufto, F
- 2021–22: Zach Metsa, D
- 2022–23: Collin Graf, F
- 2025-26: Ethan Wyttenbach, F

AHCA Second Team All-Americans

- 2005–06: Reid Cashman, D
- 2014–15: Sam Anas, F
- 2018–19: Andrew Shortridge, G
- 2021–22: Yaniv Perets, G
- 2022–23: Yaniv Perets, G; Zach Metsa, D
- 2023–24: Collin Graf, F

=== MAAC ===
==== Individual awards ====
Offensive Player of the Year

- Shawn Mansoff: 2000

Defensive Player of the Year

- Dan Ennis: 1999
- Wade Winkler: 2003

Defensive Rookie of the Year

- Dan Ennis: 1999
- Jamie Holden: 2002

Tournament Most Valuable Player

- Matt Craig: 2002

==== All-Conference Teams ====
First Team All-MAAC

- 1998–99: J. C. Wells, G; Dan Ennis, D; Kris Cumming, D; Chad Poliquin, F
- 1999–00: Anthony DiPalma, D; Shawn Mansoff, F; Chris Cerrella, F
- 2000–01: Chris Cerrella, F
- 2002–03: Wade Winkler, D; Matt Craig, F

Second Team All-MAAC

- 1998–99: Neil Breen, F
- 2001–02: Brian Herbert, F
- 2002–03: Brian Herbert, F

MAAC All-Rookie Team

- 1998–99: Dan Ennis, D; Neil Breen, F
- 1999–00: Matt Erhart, D; Brian Herbert, F
- 2000–01: Justin Eddy, G
- 2001–02: Jamie Holden, G
- 2002–03: Conrad Martin, D; Scott Reynolds, F

=== Atlantic Hockey ===
==== Individual awards ====
Player of the Year

- Reid Cashman: 2005

Regular season Goaltending Award

- Jamie Holden: 2004

Regular season Scoring Trophy

- Reid Cashman: 2005

Coach of the Year

- Rand Pecknold: 2005

==== All-Conference Teams ====
First Team All-Atlantic Hockey

- 2003–04: Jamie Holden, G
- 2004–05: Reid Cashman, D

Second Team All-Atlantic Hockey

- 2003–04: Reid Cashman, D
- 2004–05: Jamie Holden, G; Matt Craig, F

Atlantic Hockey All-Rookie Team

- 2003–04: Reid Cashman, D
- 2004–05: Matt Sorteberg, D; Ben Nelson, F

=== ECAC Hockey ===
==== Individual awards ====
ECAC Hockey Player of the Year

- Eric Hartzell: 2013
- Odeen Tufto: 2021
- Yaniv Perets: 2022
- Collin Graf: 2024

ECAC Hockey Rookie of the Year

- Bryan Leitch: 2006
- Brandon Wong: 2008
- Sam Anas: 2014
- Sam Lipkin: 2023
- Ethan Wyttenbach: 2026

Ken Dryden Award

- Eric Hartzell: 2013
- Andrew Shortridge: 2019
- Keith Petruzelli: 2021
- Yaniv Perets: 2022, 2023

ECAC Hockey Student-Athlete of the Year

- Derek Smith: 2017
- Bo Pieper: 2018

ECAC Hockey Best Defensive Defenseman

- Zach Davies: 2013
- Elliott Groenewold: 2026

ECAC Hockey Best Defensive Forward

- Skyler Brind’Amour: 2023
- Jacob Quillan: 2024
- Jack Ricketts: 2025

Tim Taylor Award

- Rand Pecknold: 2013, 2016, 2021, 2022, 2023

ECAC Hockey Most Outstanding Player in Tournament

- Connor Clifton: 2016

==== All-Conference ====
First Team All-ECAC Hockey

- 2005–06: Reid Cashman, D
- 2006–07: Reid Cashman, D
- 2012–13: Eric Hartzell, G
- 2014–15: Matthew Peca, F
- 2015–16: Sam Anas, F
- 2018–19: Andrew Shortridge, G; Chase Priskie, D
- 2020–21: Keith Petruzelli, G; Zach Metsa, D; Odeen Tufto, F
- 2021–22: Yaniv Perets, G; Zach Metsa, D
- 2022–23: Yaniv Perets, G; Collin Graf, F
- 2023–24: Jayden Lee, D; Collin Graf, F
- 2025–26: Elliott Groenewold, D; Ethan Wyttenbach, F

Second Team All-ECAC Hockey

- 2008–09: Bryan Leitch, F
- 2013–14: Kellen Jones, F; Sam Anas, F
- 2014–15: Sam Anas, F
- 2015–16: Devon Toews, D; Tim Clifton, F; Travis St. Denis, F
- 2017–18: Chase Priskie, D
- 2018–19: Odeen Tufto, F
- 2019–20: Odeen Tufto, F
- 2022–23: Zach Metsa, D; Ethan de Jong, F
- 2023–24: Jacob Quillan, F; Sam Lipkin, F
- 2024–25: Mason Marcellus, F; Jack Ricketts, F
- 2025–26: Antonin Verreault, F

Third Team All-ECAC Hockey

- 2006–07: Brandon Wong, F
- 2011–12: Connor Jones, F
- 2012–13: Zach Davies, D; Jeremy Langlois, F
- 2014–15: Michael Garteig, G; Danny Federico, D
- 2015–16: Michael Garteig, G
- 2016–17: Chase Priskie, D
- 2017–18: Odeen Tufto, F
- 2019–20: Peter DiLiberatore, D
- 2021–22: Wyatt Bongiovanni, F
- 2022–23: Skyler Brind'Amour, F
- 2023–24: Vinny Duplessis, G
- 2025–26: Mason Marcellus, F

ECAC Hockey All-Rookie Team

- 2005–06: Bryan Leitch, F
- 2006–07: Brandon Wong, F
- 2011–12: Matthew Peca, F
- 2013–14: Sam Anas, F
- 2014–15: Landon Smith, F
- 2015–16: Chase Priskie, D
- 2017–18: Odeen Tufto, F
- 2018–19: Peter DiLiberatore, D; Wyatt Bongiovanni, F
- 2020–21: Ty Smilanic, F
- 2022–23: Sam Lipkin, F
- 2023–24: Mason Marcellus, F
- 2025–26: Ethan Wyttenbach, F

== Quinnipiac Bobcats Hall of Fame ==
The following is a list of people associated with the Quinnipiac men's ice hockey program who were elected into the Quinnipiac Bobcats Hall of Fame (induction date in parentheses).

- Michael Barrett (1990)
- Richard Buckholz (2010)
- Chris Cerrella (2010)
- Russell Certo (1998)
- Richard Ciardiello (2003)
- Jim Hanscom (1994)
- Todd Johnson (2000)
- Ed Muzyka (2009)
- Rand Pecknold (2012)
- Bob Serenson (1993)
- 2001-02 Team (2012)
- Bill Verneris (1986)

== Olympians ==
This is a list of Quinnipiac alumni were a part of an Olympic team.

Name	Position	Quinnipiac Tenure	Team	Year	Finish
Devon Toews	Defenseman	2013–2016	(Canada) CAN	2026	Silver

== Bobcats in the NHL ==
As of July 1, 2025.

= NHL All-Star team	= NHL All-Star	= NHL All-Star and NHL All-Star team

Player	Position	Team(s)	Years	Games	Stanley Cups
Skyler Brind'Amour	Center	CAR	2024–Present	2	0
Connor Clifton	Defenseman	BOS, BUF, PIT	2018–Present	432	0
Connor Jones	Forward	NYI	2016–2017	4	0
Collin Graf	Right Wing	SJS	2023–Present	117	0
Zach Metsa	Defenseman	BUF	2025–Present	42	0
Matthew Peca	Center	TBL, MTL, OTT, STL	2016–2022	83	0
Yaniv Perets	Goaltender	CAR	2023–Present	2	0
Chase Priskie	Defenseman	FLA	2021–2022	4	0
Jacob Quillan	Center	TOR	2024–Present	21	0
Brogan Rafferty	Defenseman	VAN	2018–2021	3	0
Devon Toews	Defenseman	NYI, COL	2018–Present	538	1
Bryce Van Brabant	Left Wing	CGY	2013–2014	6	0

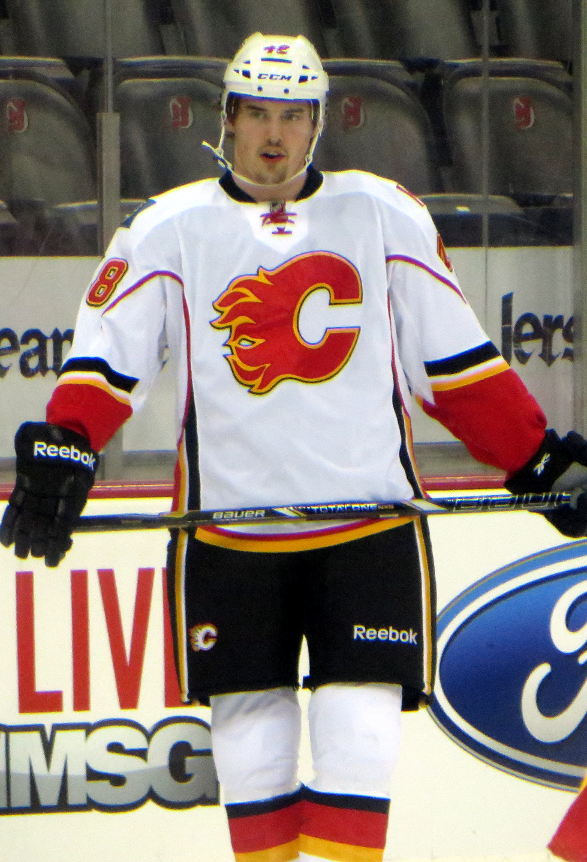
Bryce Van Brabant

== See also ==
- Quinnipiac Bobcats women's ice hockey
