= Alaska State School for the Deaf and Hard of Hearing =

School for the deaf in Anchorage, Alaska, US

Coordinates: 61.19437°N 149.7754°W

Alaska School for the Deaf and Hard of Hearing

Location
- 5530 E. Northern Lights Blvd; Anchorage, Alaska 99504; United States

Information
- Type: School for the Deaf
- Established: 1975 (51 years ago)
- CEEB code: 020407
- Principal: Ann Curry
- Grades: Pre-K to 12
- Enrollment: 35 to 50
- Language: American Sign Language, English
- Colors: Purple and white
- Mascot: Otter
- Website: aksdhh.asdk12.org

The Alaska State School for the Deaf and Hard of Hearing (AKSD, previously abbreviated as ASSDHH) is a public school located in Anchorage, Alaska, United States.

Its affiliated schools are Russian Jack Elementary School, Orah Dee Clark Middle School, and Bettye Davis East Anchorage High School.

== History ==
In 1972, the Alaska Department of Education, in collaboration with the Anchorage School District, established and funded the Alaska State Program for the Deaf (ASPD). In 1975, elementary school classes for ASSDHH began. In 1987, the school's name was changed to Alaska State School for the Deaf. Middle school and high school locations were added in 1992. An infant learning program also operated by ASSDHH between 1980 and 2002. In 1995, the school was given its current name, Alaska State School for the Deaf and Hard of Hearing, recognizing its inclusion of students beyond deafness.

For a period the school used ASSDHH as its acronym, but in 2016 it began using AKSD instead.

== Description ==
ASSDHH has an enrollment of 35 to 50 students, ranging from pre-kindergarten to high school ages. Its facilities have been in multiple locations in the Anchorage School District, and are now educating its students at Russian Jack Elementary School, Clark Middle School, and East High School.

Students not from the Anchorage area stay with host families participating in the Hope Community Resources-Rural Deaf Student Support Program. The school previously cooperated with the non-profit organization ARC of Anchorage which operated the Student Living Center.
