= Eagle River High School =

Location
- 8701 Yosemite Drive; Eagle River, Alaska 99577; United States
- 61°17′53″N 149°34′42″W

Information
- School type: Public high school
- Motto: Community, Excellence, Respect
- Established: 2005 (21 years ago)
- School district: Anchorage School District
- CEEB code: 020368
- Principal: Timothy Helvey
- Teaching staff: 38.40 (FTE)
- Grades: 9–12
- Enrollment: 794 (2023–2024)
- Student to teacher ratio: 20.68
- Colors: Navy and silver
- Mascot: Wolf
- Newspaper: The Howl
- Building size: 182,000 sq ft (16,900 m^{2})
- Website: www.asdk12.org/eagleriverhigh
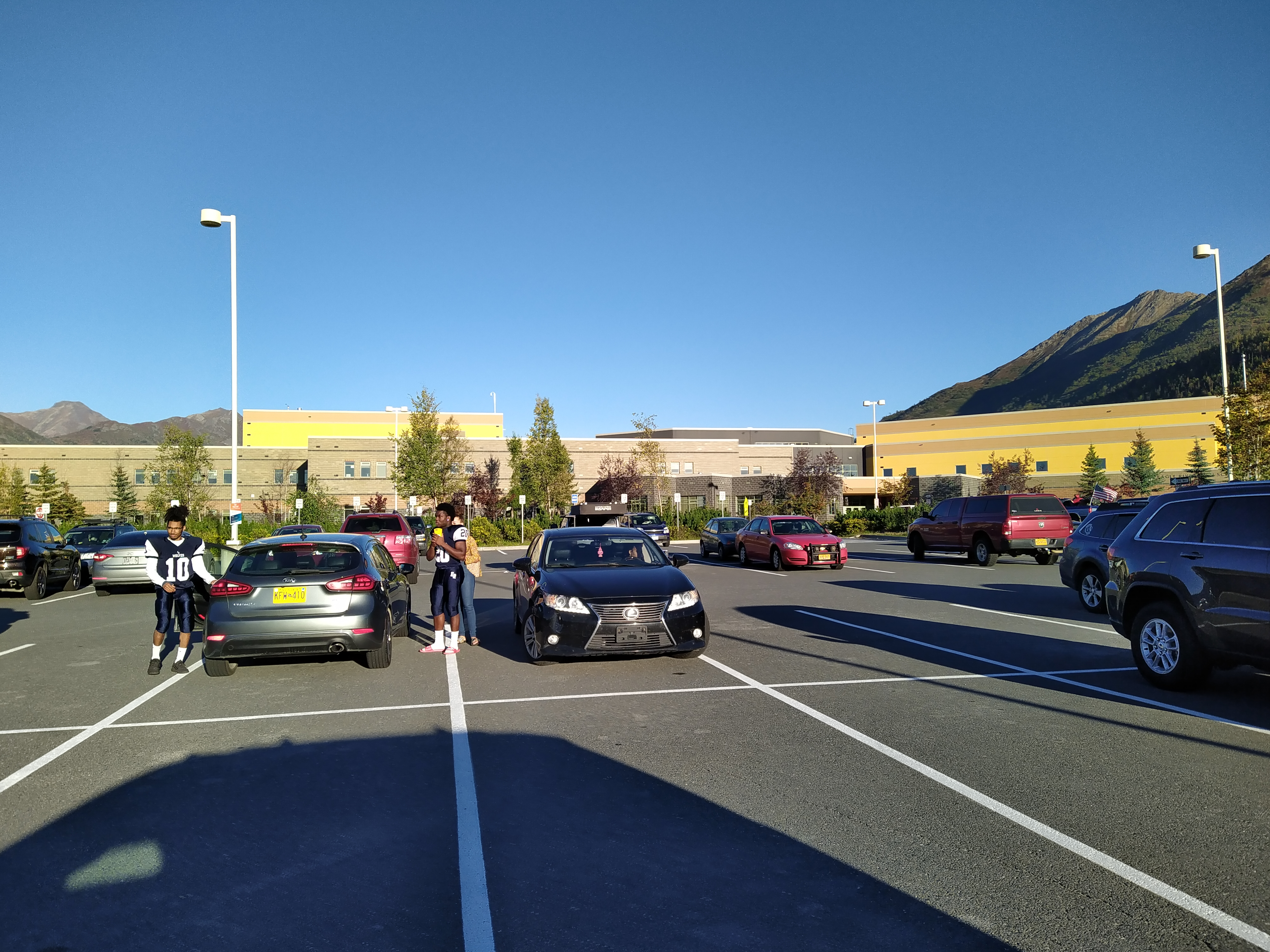

Eagle River High School (ERHS) is a public high school in Eagle River, a suburb of the city of Anchorage in the U.S. state of Alaska. Opened in 2005, it serves students living in Eagle River and on Joint Base Elmendorf-Richardson. Enrollment in the 2016-17 year is 894. The current principal is Timothy Helvey.

== General information ==
Eagle River High is part of the Anchorage School District. The school board allowed the school's colors and mascot to be selected by the students before the school opened, with the results being the Wolves in navy blue and silver. In 2006, students were also permitted to select its mission statement, which is a simple, three-word statement of "Community, Excellence, Respect".

== History ==
The groundbreaking ceremony was held on July 31, 2003, with construction on the school completed in August 2005. The main purpose of this school was to relieve the overfilled schools around the Anchorage School District, primarily Chugiak High School and Bartlett High School. When designed, the school was strategically placed to take advantage of the local community of Eagle River and the nearby mountains. ERHS was initially designed to host 800 students, though the school is built for further growth, as the gym, library and the cafeteria are designed to hold 1,600 students. In addition, a large field on the north side of the school has been left open for construction of a secondary academic wing, effectively doubling the school's capacity. In 2013, a new statewide rating system for academics ranked ERHS the highest school in the Anchorage School District, and second in the state.

== Campus building ==
Eagle River High School is located on a 50-acre (200,000 m^{2}) site on the south side of Eagle River off of Yosemite Drive. Over 7000 workers and contractors from USKH Inc. and Davis Construction and Engineers began assembly of the 182,000 sq/ft building on July 31, 2003, beginning with the groundbreaking ceremony. Construction of the building took about 2 years, ending in August, with the ribbon cutting ceremony on August 17, 2005. With 46 instruction rooms, and 38-foot (12 m) ceilings in the commons area, the school partially fulfills the public need. The floor plan has the same basic design as the 1,600-student Dimond High School but is about half the size, using one wing of classrooms instead of two.

The cost of the building was 54 million dollars, with 2% of that being paid for by the state of Alaska through the school debt reimbursement program. The school services students from the Eagle River area as well as Fort Richardson and the Chugiak area. Most of the school's original population came from what were Chugiak High School and Bartlett High School attendance zones.

== Academics ==
Eagle River High School's classes range from advanced placement (AP) to special needs courses.

Some of the advanced placement (AP) classes that the school offers include:

- Calculus
- Statistics
- Computer Science
- Physics
- Chemistry
- Biology
- Literature
- Language
- US Government
- US History
- World History
- European History
- Economics
- Psychology

The school's first school year, 2005–2006, showed favorable results from the SBA and HSGQE tests, placing Eagle River High School around 10% higher than the Anchorage School District in reading, writing and math.

== Athletics ==
Eagle River is part of Region IV, which competes with all of the other Anchorage-area schools. Eagle River participates in the 4A class. Interscholastic sports are sanctioned by the Alaska School Activities Association.

These sports include:

- Football
- Flag football
- Riflery
- Hockey
- Softball
- Girls' Soccer
- Boys' Soccer
- Basketball
- Bowling
- Tennis
- Cross Country Running
- Cross Country Skiing
- Track and Field
- Wrestling
- Volleyball
- Cheer Leading
- Swimming/Diving
- Gymnastics

=== Notable State Championships ===
During the school's first season in 2005–06, the girls' softball team won the Alaska Large Schools State Championship.

Competitive co-ed cheer won ASAA State 2012 under the coaching of Melissa Brady from the Alaska Large Schools State Championship.

== Alumni ==
- Andrew Shortridge (born 1995), American professional ice hockey goaltender
- Jordyn Bruce (born 1998), American heptathlete and decathlete
