= Andrew Shortridge =

American ice hockey player

- Born: April 26, 1995 (age 31) Anchorage, Alaska, U.S.
- Height: 6 ft 4 in (193 cm)
- Weight: 185 lb (84 kg; 13 st 3 lb)
- Position: Goaltender
- Catches: Left
- team Former teams: Free Agent; San Jose Barracuda; Stockton Heat
- NHL draft: Undrafted
- Playing career: 2019–present

Andrew Shortridge (born April 26, 1995) is an American professional ice hockey goaltender. He is currently an unrestricted free agent. He has played with the San Jose Barracuda and the Stockton Heat in the American Hockey League (AHL). He was an All-American for Quinnipiac.

== Playing career ==
Shortridge distinguished himself as a goaltending prospect at Eagle River High School as well as a local AAA organization. Before he graduated, Shortridge travelled south and began playing junior hockey in the Tier 1 Elite Hockey League. After aging out of the league, he continued his junior career for two seasons in two separate leagues. In 2016, Shortridge began attending Quinnipiac University and split the starting role with Air Force transfer Chris Truehl. Over the course of the season, Shortridge proved himself to be the better option in net and became the Bobcat's primary goaltender. After a slight decline as a sophomore, Shortridge was one of the top goaltenders in the nation as a junior; he led all qualifying goaltenders in both goals against average and save percentage and was named an All-American. He led Quinnipiac to a first-place finish in ECAC Hockey and though the team lost in the conference quarterfinals, the Bobcats' record was strong enough to earn them a bid into the NCAA Tournament.

After Quinnipiac was eliminated by eventual champion Minnesota Duluth, Shortridge signed a professional contract with the San Jose Sharks and was assigned to their AHL affiliate for the remainder of the year. For his first full season as a professional, Shortridge began in the AHL. After a less-than-stellar performance, however, he was demoted to the ECHL. While his numbers improved with the Allen Americans, Shortridge moved over to the Calgary Flames organization the following season. Despite his playing time being limited due to the COVID-19 pandemic, Shortridge played well enough to receive some playing time in the AHL.

== Career statistics ==
			Regular season									Playoffs
Season	Team	League	GP	W	L	OT	MIN	GA	SO	GAA	SV%	GP	W	L	MIN	GA	SO	GAA	SV%
2008–09	Anchorage North Stars 14U AA	14U AA	7	6	1	0	—	—	5	0.85	.938	2	1	1	—	—	0	3.00	.864
2009–10	Eagle River High	HS-AK	—	—	—	—	—	—	—	—	—	—	—	—	—	—	—	—	—
2010–11	Eagle River High	HS-AK	13	—	—	—	—	—	—	3.74	.893	—	—	—	—	—	—	—	—
2010–11	Alaska Wolves 16U AAA	16U AAA	6	6	0	0	—	—	0	1.33	.873	2	2	0	120	1	1	0.50	.963
2011–12	Eagle River High	HS-AK	6	—	—	—	—	—	—	2.01	.921	—	—	—	—	—	—	—	—
2011–12	Alaska Wolves 18U AAA	18U AAA	2	2	0	0	—	—	0	1.00	.943	—	—	—	—	—	—	—	—
2011–12	St. Louis Amateur Blues 18U AAA	T1EHL	12	—	—	—	—	—	—	1.97	.903	—	—	—	—	—	—	—	—
2012–13	Phoenix Jr. Coyotes 18U AAA	T1EHL	23	—	—	—	—	—	—	3.24	.886	—	—	—	—	—	—	—	—
2013–14	Phoenix Jr. Coyotes 18U AAA	T1EHL	18	—	—	—	—	—	—	2.60	.903	—	—	—	—	—	—	—	—
2014–15	Aberdeen Wings	NAHL	33	15	15	1	1918	82	3	2.57	.913	2	—	—	—	—	—	4.03	.889
2015–16	Vernon Vipers	BCHL	44	19	25	0	2593	136	2	3.15	.915	5	1	4	—	—	—	4.23	.897
2016–17	Quinnipiac	ECAC	26	13	7	0	1268	44	1	2.08	.920	—	—	—	—	—	—	—	—
2017–18	Quinnipiac	ECAC	25	11	12	2	1422	56	5	2.36	.906	—	—	—	—	—	—	—	—
2018–19	Quinnipiac	ECAC	27	18	7	2	1545	39	4	1.51	.940	—	—	—	—	—	—	—	—
2018–19	San Jose Barracuda	AHL	1	0	1	0	59	3	0	3.08	.917	—	—	—	—	—	—	—	—
2019–20	San Jose Barracuda	AHL	14	3	7	0	678	42	0	3.71	.862	—	—	—	—	—	—	—	—
2019–20	Allen Americans	ECHL	10	4	4	1	576	27	2	2.81	.915	—	—	—	—	—	—	—	—
2020–21	Kansas City Mavericks	ECHL	14	7	5	1	782	38	1	2.92	.905	—	—	—	—	—	—	—	—
2020–21	Stockton Heat	AHL	3	1	0	1	152	4	0	1.58	.952	—	—	—	—	—	—	—	—
2021–22	Kansas City Mavericks	ECHL	15	7	7	0	841	41	1	2.92	.902	—	—	—	—	—	—	—	—
2021–22	Stockton Heat	AHL	1	0	1	0	60	4	0	4.00	.846	—	—	—	—	—	—	—	—
AHL totals			19	4	9	1	949	53	0	3.35	.882	—	—	—	—	—	—	—	—

== Awards and honors ==
Award	Year
College
All-ECAC Hockey First Team	2018–19
AHCA East Second Team All-American	2018–19

Awards and achievements
Preceded by Matthew Galajda	Ken Dryden Award; 2018–19	Succeeded by Frank Marotte
