= Birchwood Airport =

- IATA: none; ICAO: PABV; FAA LID: BCV

Summary
- Airport type: Public
- Owner: State of Alaska DOT&PF
- Serves: Birchwood, Alaska
- Elevation AMSL: 83 ft (25 m)
- Coordinates: 61°24′58″N 149°30′30″W

Map
- Location of airport in Alaska

Runways
Direction	Length		Surface
Direction	ft	m	Surface
2L/20R	4,010	1,222	Asphalt
2R/20L	1,800	549	Asphalt/gravel

Statistics (2015)
- Aircraft operations: 70,188 (2013)
- Based aircraft: 303
- Source: Federal Aviation Administration

Birchwood Airport (ICAO: PABV, FAA LID: BCV) is a state-owned public-use airport located two nautical miles (4 km) northwest of the central business district of Birchwood (also known as Chugiak), in the Anchorage Municipality of the U.S. state of Alaska.

As per Federal Aviation Administration records, the airport had 450 passenger boardings (enplanements) in calendar year 2010, an increase of 20% from the 375 enplanements in 2009. This airport is included in the FAA's National Plan of Integrated Airport Systems for 2011–2015, which categorized it as a general aviation airport.

== Facilities and aircraft ==
Birchwood Airport covers an area of 196 acres (79 ha) at an elevation of 83 feet (25 m) above mean sea level. It has two runways: 1L/19R is 4,008 by 100 feet (1,222 x 30 m) with an asphalt surface; 1R/19L is 1,802 by 50 feet (549 x 15 m) with an asphalt and gravel surface. There are 292 aircraft based at this airport: 94% single-engine, 2% multi-engine, 1% helicopter, 1% glider, and 2% ultralight.

== See also ==
- List of airports in Alaska
