= Anchorage School District =

School district in Alaska

Address
- 5530 East Northern Lights Boulevard Anchorage, Alaska, 99504; United States

District information
- Type: Public
- Grades: Pre-K–12
- Superintendent: Jharrett Bryantt
- Schools: 94
- NCES District ID: 0200180

Students and staff
- Students: 42,573
- Teachers: 2,208.17
- Staff: 3,003.39
- Student–teacher ratio: 19.28

Other information
- Website: www.asdk12.org

The Anchorage School District (ASD) manages all public schools within the Municipality of Anchorage in the U.S. state of Alaska. It is the 107th largest school district in the United States, serving over 45,000 students in more than 100 schools.

== Operations ==
The district includes all of Anchorage municipality.

District superintendent Carol Comeau, appointed in December 2000, retired June 30, 2012. She was succeeded by Jim Browder. After eight months, Jim Browder resigned and was replaced by Ed Graff; later in 2015 Ed Graff was replaced by Deena Bishop (formerly Deena Paramo), previously the Superintendent of Matsu Valley School District. Bishop resigned at the end of the 2022 school term and was replaced by Jharrett Bryantt.

== Demographics ==
In the 2018-2019 school year, the Anchorage School District enrolled approximately 46,695 students. In terms of race and ethnicity, the Anchorage School District is considered a minority-majority district, meaning the minority groups make up the majority of the district's population. Non-white students make up roughly 58 percent of the school district's student body.

Composition:

41%	White
5%	Black
11%	Hispanic
17%	Asian/Pacific Islander
9%	American Indian/Alaska Native
15.78%	Multi-ethnic

The district served approximately 8,600 students with special needs who were eligible for special education services in 2008-09. Also that year, the district's English Language Learner program for students with limited English Proficiency served 5,808 students and the Gifted program assisted 3,563 students.

== Instruction ==
In 2008-09, the district's graduation rate was 70.48 percent. It has increased nearly 11 percentage points since the 2004-05 school year. The dropout rate for ASD students is 3.43 percent, a figure that has been cut nearly in half since the 2004-05 school year.

In 2009-10, ASD had 48 teachers certified by the National Board for Professional Teaching Standards. National board certification is voluntary and involves a rigorous performance-based assessment that takes one to three years for a successful candidate to achieve. The certification complements, but does not replace a state's teacher certificate. It is valid for 10 years and establishes the teacher as “highly qualified” and a “master” teacher in the eyes of the district and state.

In 2009-10, 99 percent of new teachers were highly qualified. The remaining 1 percent were unable to prove their HQT status and were terminated. As of May 1, 2010, the state HQT reports 95.4 percent of ASD teachers had an HQT designation in the content area they were teaching. To put this into perspective almost six years after the State adopted regulations mandating that urban District's limit instruction in core classes to HQ teachers, ASD is still out of compliance, while HQ requirements can be via Praxis examinations.

The district also has approximately 225 certificated employees such as counselors, psychologists, speech pathologists, OT/PT, nurses and more.

ASD's last curriculum audit was conducted in 2002.

22.5 credits are required to graduate high school in the Anchorage School District. All high schools in the Anchorage School District offer AP (Advanced Placement) classes, but only West Anchorage High School offers IB (International Baccalaureate) classes.

== Test scores ==
The district releases test scores each fall in a comprehensive report called Profile of Performance. See Expect the Best is a condensed version of that 2,000-page document: it is put forward as an annual report to the community.

In 2008-09 test scores remained relatively flat. Language arts scores declined from 81.4 to 80.4 percent and math scores declined from 73.7 to 71.4 percent since last year. These scores follow three years of steady growth.

In order to make AYP (adequate yearly progress) each school must meet up to 31 specific targets that have been established by the state in which the district is located. Proficiency on state adopted measurements, test participation, attendance, and graduation rates are used to determine AYP for each school each year. 2008-09 school-wide results for the district's 96 schools are as follows:

- 96 percent met the test participating requirement.
- 85 percent met the language arts requirement.
- 89 percent met the math requirement.
- 97 percent met the attendance/graduation requirement.

Thirty-nine ASD schools met every requirement for which they were accountable. Fifteen missed AYP by just one target; 42 schools missed by two or more targets. Complete coverage, including historical statistics, of federal AYP requirements, are available on the district's website.

In 2009, only some 27% of students in Alaska were proficient in Reading on the NAEP test. For some reason, though Anchorage's population exceeded 250,000 NAEP did not include Anchorage in its review of Urban Districts.

== Food service ==
On December 16, 2019, news was announced to all students at the schools serving Subway sandwiches for lunch that the district decided to go with more healthy and convenient options for school lunches, removing Subway sandwiches from the menu. It went into effect the second semester of the 2019-2020 school year..

== Schools ==
=== High schools ===
- Bartlett High School
- Bettye Davis East Anchorage High School
- Chugiak High School
- Dimond High School
- Eagle River High School
- Service High School
- South High School
- West High School

=== Middle schools ===
- Central Middle School of Science
- Begich Middle School
- Clark Middle School
- Goldenview Middle School
- Gruening Middle School
- Hanshew Middle School
- Mears Middle School
- Mirror Lake Middle School
- Romig Middle School
- Wendler Middle School

=== Combined secondary schools ===
- Steller Secondary School

=== Kindergarten - Grade 12 schools ===
- Polaris K-12 School

=== Elementary schools ===
- Airport Heights Elementary
- Alpenglow Elementary
- Aurora Elementary
- Baxter Elementary
- Bayshore Elementary
- Bear Valley Elementary
- Birchwood ABC Elementary
- Bowman Elementary
- Chester Valley Elementary
- Chinook Elementary
- Chugach Optional Elementary
- Chugiak Elementary
- College Gate Elementary
- Creekside Park Elementary
- Denali Montessori
- Eagle River Elementary
- Fairview Elementary
- Gladys Wood Elementary
- Government Hill Elementary
- Homestead Elementary
- Huffman Elementary
- Inlet View Elementary
- Kasuun Elementary
- Kincaid Elementary
- Klatt Elementary
- Mountain View Elementary
- Muldoon Elementary
- North Star Elementary
- Northern Lights ABC School
- Northwood ABC Elementary
- O'Malley Elementary
- Ocean View Elementary
- Orion Elementary
- Ptarmigan Elementary
- Rabbit Creek Elementary
- Ravenwood Elementary
- Rogers Park Elementary
- Russian Jack Elementary
- Sand Lake Elementary
- Scenic Park Elementary
- Spring Hill Elementary
- Susitna Elementary
- Taku Elementary
- Trailside Elementary
- Tudor Elementary
- Turnagain Elementary
- Tyson Elementary
- Ursa Minor Elementary
- Williwaw Elementary
- Willow Crest Elementary
- Wonder Park Elementary

=== Charter schools ===
- Alaska Native Cultural Charter School
- Aquarian Charter School
- Anchorage STrEaM Academy
- Eagle Academy Charter School
- Family Partnership Charter School
- Frontier Charter School
- Highland Tech Academy School
- Rilke Schule German School of Arts & Sciences
- Winterberry Charter School

=== Other specialized schools and programs ===
- ACE/ACT
- Alaska State School for the Deaf and Hard of Hearing
- AVAIL
- Booth Secondary
- Benny Benson Secondary School (also known as SAVE II)
- Crossroads 7-12
- Continuation Program
- Girdwood K-8 School
- Martin Luther King Jr. Technical High School
- McLaughlin Youth Center
- Northern Lights ABC K-8
- Whaley School

== See also ==
- List of high schools in Alaska
- List of middle schools in Alaska
- List of school districts in Alaska
