= Polaris K–12 School =

Polaris K-12 School

Location
- 6200 Ashwood Street; Anchorage, Alaska 99507; United States
- 61°09′53″N 149°51′14″W

Information
- Type: Public magnet school
- School district: Anchorage School District
- CEEB code: 020312
- Principal: Tia Clay
- Teaching staff: 28
- Grades: K–12
- Enrollment: 475 (2015-16)
- Colors: Evergreen and grey
- Mascot: Wolf
- Website: www.asdk12.org/polarisk12

Polaris K–12 School is a lottery-entry alternative school serving grades Kindergarten through 12th grade in Anchorage, Alaska. It serves the Anchorage School District.

== Student Government ==
The Polaris student government Is not a typical student government model consisting of a president, a vice president, etc., but is run by an operational board, or op. board, consisting of four Senior Operational Board Members (Juniors/Seniors), two High School Student Advisory Board Positions (High Schoolers), four Junior Operational Board Positions (9th-10th Graders), two Middle School Mentees (6th-8th Graders), and Middle School Student Advisory Board Positions (6th-8th Graders).

== Programs ==
In addition to typical programs found in schools serving its grade levels, Polaris's other programs include:

- Intensives - 2-week courses which allow students to study topics not offered in a typical school curriculum. These are offered at the beginning of the school year, after winter break, and at the end of the school year.
- The Habitat - an outdoor learning environment.

== Tent City Project ==
On February 27, 2015, the school celebrated Anchorage's 100th anniversary with a "tent city". The project was initiated by two students who wondered what life in Anchorage was like in 1915.

== Alaska State Dog ==
Polaris School students were instrumental in having the Alaskan Malamute designated as Alaska's official state dog. Over a three-year period, students did research and testified before the state legislature.
