= Eagle Peak (Alaska) =

Mountain in Alaska, United States

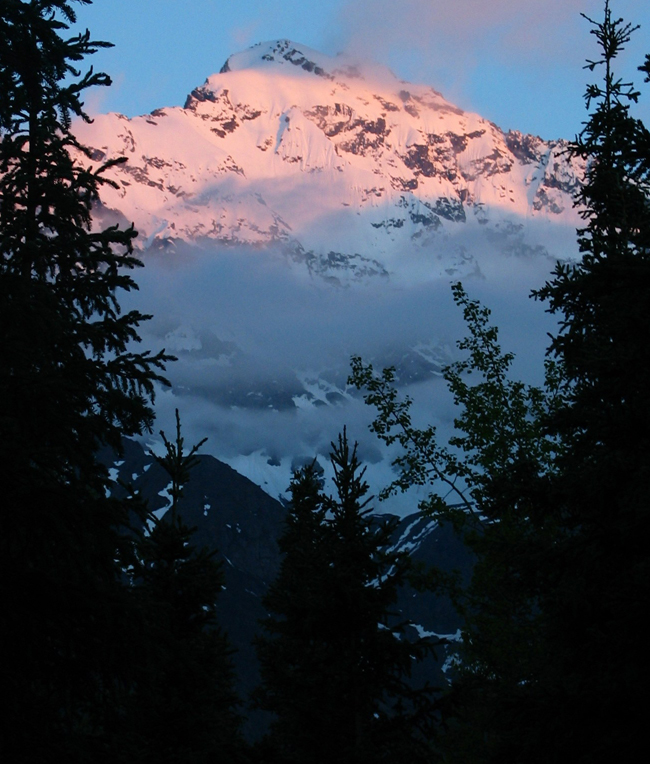
- The Northern face of Eagle Peak remains covered in snow throughout early summer

Highest point
- Elevation: 6,955 ft (2,120 m)
- Coordinates: 61°10′01″N 149°16′01″W

Geography
- Location within Alaska
- Interactive map of Eagle Peak
- Location: Anchorage Municipality, Alaska, U.S.
- Parent range: Chugach Mountains

Climbing
- First ascent: 1966; B. Babcock, B. Hauser
- Easiest route: The southern face and southeast ridges are the most popular, and probably safest, routes.

Eagle Peak is a 6,955-foot (2,120 m) mountain in the U.S. state of Alaska, located in Chugach State Park in Anchorage Municipality. The peak is named after the Eagle River. On clear days, the peak is visible from Anchorage.

== Location ==
The peak is situated at the head of South Fork Eagle River Valley, east of downtown Anchorage, and stands out as the highest summit along a long ridgeline that includes Flute Peak (6610 ft.) and Hurdygurdy Mountain (5965 ft.) Towering above Eagle Lake, Flute Glacier, and Eagle River Valley, Eagle Peak is one of several imposing peaks in the immediate area over 6000 feet.

== Topography ==
Starting from a base elevation on the Eastern side of approximately 700 ft., Eagle Peak climbs to its 6955 ft. summit in little more than a mile and a half. Aerially it resembles a three-sided pyramid, with ridges connecting from the Northwest and South. All sides feature extensive cliff banding, with a prominent series of cliffs on the Northern face that climb nearly 3000 vertical feet.

== Terrain ==
Beginning at approximately 1000 ft., Eagle Peak becomes a predominantly alpine zone, characterized by extremely scant vegetation, a variety of lichens, snow pack (including year-round snowfields), and a large amount of bare, and often loose, rock.

== Wildlife ==
Like many Alaskan mountains, Eagle Peak may be frequented by ptarmigan, Dahl sheep, mountain goats, and other alpine animals. Despite the lack of vegetation, a variety of insects thrive at high elevations throughout Alaska. Overhead, one may spot a hawk or eagle.

== Gallery ==
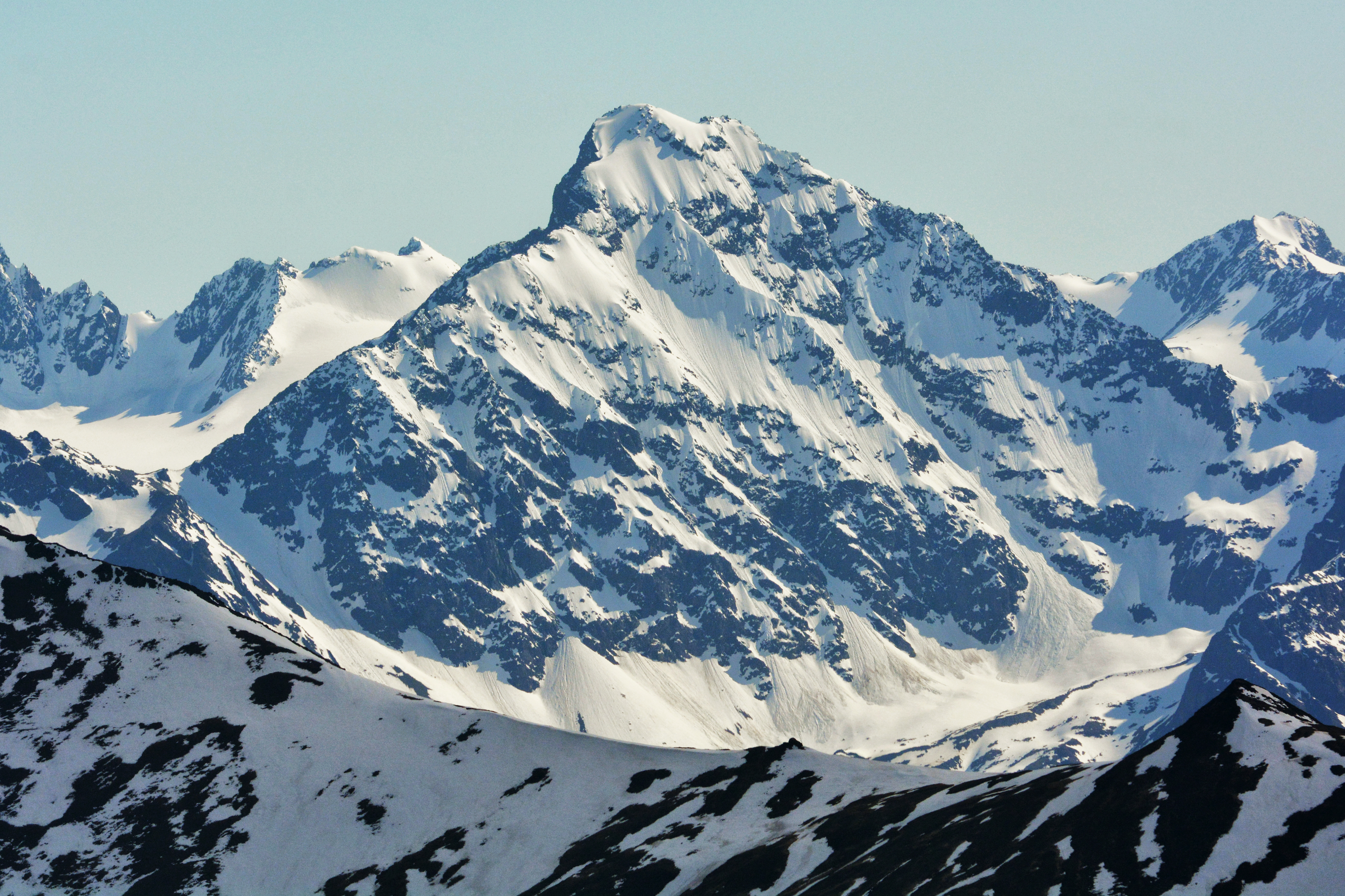
Eagle Peak
