= Chugiak High School =

Location
- 16525 South Birchwood Road; Chugiak, Alaska 99567; United States; 61°22′09″N 149°32′10″W

Information
- Type: Public secondary
- Established: 1964
- School district: Anchorage School District
- CEEB code: 020031
- Principal: Megan Hatswell
- Teaching staff: 40.05 (FTE)
- Grades: 9–12
- Enrollment: 928 (2024–2025)
- Student to teacher ratio: 23.17
- Colors: Carolina Blue, Black, and White
- Athletics: Wrestling, track, gymnastics, volleyball, football, hockey, skiing, bowling
- Mascot: Mustang
- Accreditation: Northwest Association of Accredited Schools
- Website: www.asdk12.org/Chugiakhigh

Chugiak High School is a public high school located in Chugiak, Anchorage, Alaska, and a part of the Anchorage School District. Chugiak's mascot is the Mustang and the school colors are blue, black, and white. In 2005, Chugiak's student population was split as half their students went to the new Eagle River High School. As of 2020, it has a student enrollment of 905 and 47 teachers.

== Demographics ==
The student body at Chugiak is fairly homogeneous. Ethnic/racial composition for school year 2015-16:

Race	Percent (%)	Amount
White	70	756
Black	2	22
Alaska Native / American Indian	6	65
Asian / Pacific Islander	4	43
Hispanic	8	86
Multi-Racial	10	108

== Academics ==
Chugiak offers several Advanced Placement courses, including:

- AP English Language and Composition
- AP English Literature and Composition
- AP Comparative Government and Politics
- AP United States Government and Politics
- AP United States History
- AP World History
- AP Calculus AB and BC
- AP Statistics
- AP Biology
- AP Physics 1 and 2
- AP Spanish Language and Culture
- AP German Language and Culture
- AP Seminar

The school has an 86.98% graduation rate, higher than the district average of 69.40%. Chugiak has continually scored higher than the district average in terms of reading, writing, and mathematics proficiency on the High School Graduation Qualifying Exam (HSGQE). In the 2008–2009 school year, 10th graders at Chugiak showed 97.99% proficiency on the HSGQE Reading Test, 90.46% proficiency on the HSGQE Writing Test, and 90.73% proficiency on the HSGQE Mathematics Test (as compared to respective district averages of 91.54%, 80.15%, and 82.44%).

== Athletics ==
=== Football ===
In September 2007, Chugiak's football team was ranked #1 in its division in the state. In the 2009 season, the Chugiak football team took second place for large schools in Alaska. The softball team took second place at the state competition that year as well.

=== Soccer ===
Under coach Ed Blahous, the boys' varsity team took numerous state titles beginning in 1983.

== Notable alumni ==
- Sam Hoger, appeared on the first season of The Ultimate Fighter, retired professional MMA fighter
- Randy Phillips (class of 1969), member of the Alaska House of Representatives and the Alaska Senate from Eagle River 1977-2003
- Bill Stoltze (class of 1979), member of the Alaska House of Representatives from Chugiak since 2003
- Brian Swanson (class of 1994), player with the Alaska Aces; previously played with NHL teams the Edmonton Oilers and the Atlanta Thrashers
- Scott Parker (ca. 1996), former NHL player with the Colorado Avalanche and the San Jose Sharks
- Pam Dreyer (class of 1999), Bronze medalist in 2006 Winter Olympics, Women's Hockey, goalie
- Sara King (class of 2001), science fiction writer
- Kelsey Griffin (class of 2005), player with the Connecticut Sun of the WNBA
- Britney Young (class of 2006), actress on the Netflix series GLOW
- Brian Niedermeyer (class of 2007), college football coach
- Alev Kelter (class of 2009), rugby player for the US National team
