= Carol Comeau =

American educator (born 1941)

- Born: Carol Smith; September 4, 1941 (age 83); Berkeley, California, U.S.
- Occupation: Educator

Carol Comeau (née Smith; born September 4, 1941) is an American educator. She was inaugurated to the Alaska Women's Hall of Fame in 2009.

== Personal life and education ==
Carol Comeau was born in Berkeley, California and raised in Iowa. Her father died when she was seven. When she was young, she wanted to be an investigative reporter. She attended the University of Oregon to earn her bachelor's degree in journalism, however, she started studying elementary education her sophomore year. In 1960, she met Dennis Comeau. She and Dennis married in 1962. His father owned a grocery store in Anchorage, Alaska. In 1963, Carol and Dennis spent the summer in Anchorage working for his father, before they returned to Oregon so Dennis could finish his degree. Carol Comeau worked in Springfield, Oregon. In 1965, they moved to Alaska.

In 1972, the couple moved back to Spokane, Washington. Dennis worked for Chevron. They returned to Alaska in 1974. Together, they had three children, Christopher, Michael, and Karen. Comeau returned to work full-time after ten years. Comeau earned her Master's degree in public administration and education from the University of Alaska Anchorage. She and Dennis have five grandchildren together, Adam, Amanda, Samantha, Reid, and Elizabeth.

== Work ==
Comeau started teaching again in 1975. She helped lead a strike, which lasted seven days, in 1979. In 1984, she became president of the Anchorage Education Association. In 1993, she became a superintendent for the Anchorage School District. She became head superintendent for the school district in 2000. She helped get Islamic and Jewish holidays added to the school calendar and included sexual orientation as part of the anti-harassment policy for the Anchorage School District. As of 2011, Comeau was one of the lowest paid city school superintendents in the United States. She retired on June 30, 2012.

== Legacy ==
Comeau was named Alaska Superintendent of the Year in 2004. In 2007, she was awarded an honorary doctorate at the University of Alaska Anchorage. In 2012, she was named an alumnus of Distinction and given the Alumni of Achievement Award by the University of Alaska Anchorage. An endowment at the Alaska Community Foundation is named after Comeau, which is focused on education.
