= Eagle River, Anchorage, Alaska =

Community in Alaska, USA

Coordinates: 61°19′17″N 149°34′04″W

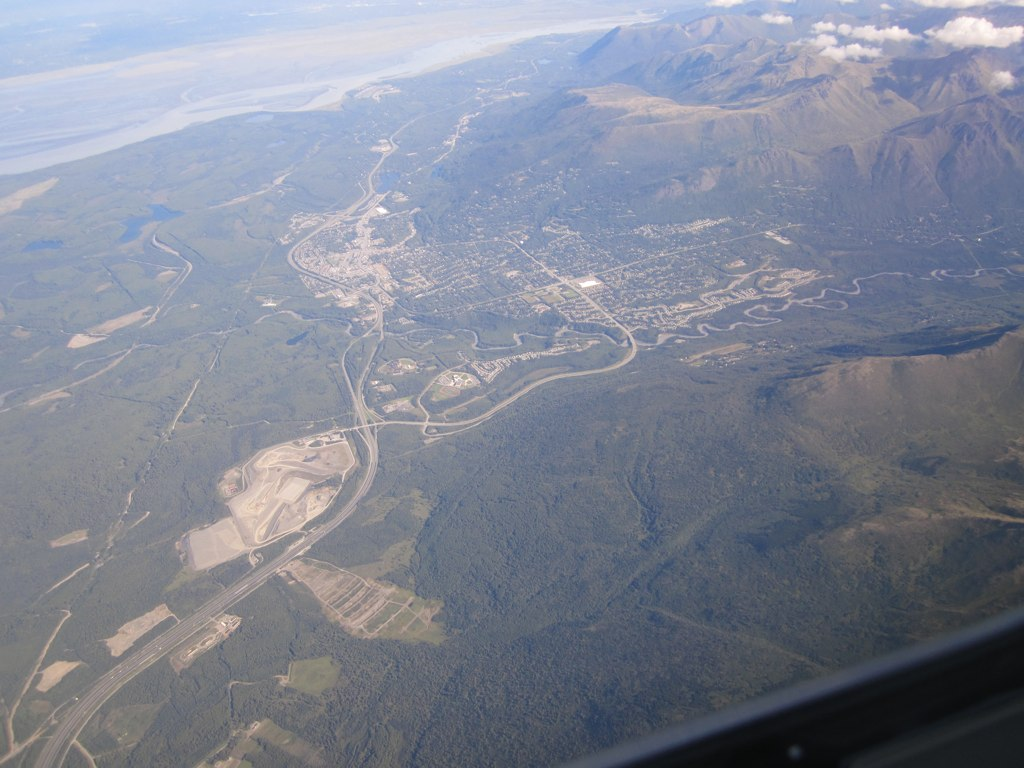
Aerial view, looking northeasterly, of Eagle River and the surrounding area. View includes portions of Chugach State Park, the Glenn Highway, Joint Base Elmendorf-Richardson and Knik Arm. The river of Eagle River itself can be seen following a winding path to the south of the settlement.

Eagle River is a community within the Municipality of Anchorage situated on the Eagle River, for which it is named, between Joint Base Elmendorf-Richardson (JBER) and Chugach State Park in the Chugach Mountains. Its ZIP code is 99577. Settled by homesteaders, Eagle River was annexed to the Municipality of Anchorage in the 1970s—a relationship that is, at times, complicated. Eagle River functions as an Anchorage suburb – many Eagle River residents work, shop, and participate in community life in the Anchorage Bowl. The community is itself also a significant business hub between Wasilla and Anchorage, offering shopping, restaurants, recreation and employment. Much of the community is made up of residents from nearby Joint Base Elmendorf-Richardson. Secession efforts have from time to time gained traction by residents who would like Eagle River legally regarded as a separate community. Eagle River also has a close relationship with its neighboring community to the north, Chugiak, with which it shares some history. If Eagle River were not part of the Municipality of Anchorage, it would be one of the five largest cities in Alaska.

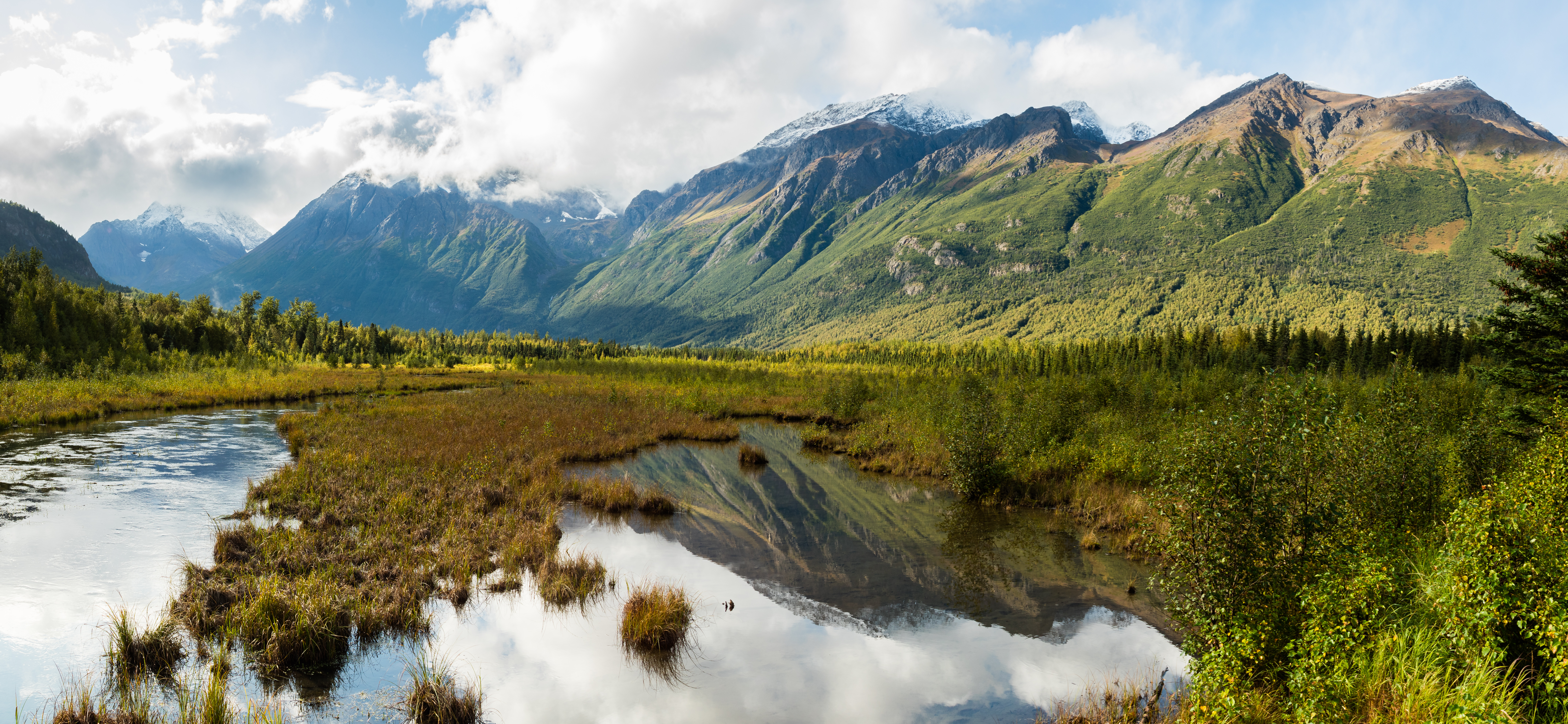
View of the mountainous scenery found in abundance in the upper Eagle River valley.

== History ==
The Eagle River (and Chugiak) area was settled by homesteaders and prospered on agricultural activities. The name Eagle River was first reported in 1939 by the U.S. Geological Survey, and the Eagle River post office was established in 1961.

In 1964, the state legislature first divided the state into seven boroughs. Over the next decade, many area residents objected to the Chugiak-Eagle River area being lumped in as part of a Greater Anchorage-Area Borough. The Chugiak-Eagle River Borough was established in 1974, only to be dissolved shortly thereafter when the arrangement was ruled unconstitutional by the Alaska Supreme Court.

Despite some local opposition, both Chugiak and Eagle River were annexed to the Municipality of Anchorage when the City of Anchorage and the Greater Anchorage Area Borough were unified in 1975. Efforts to secede from the Municipality surfaced around 2000, and then became less prominent for a while as the community saw an influx of residents with social and economic ties to Anchorage and nearby Joint Base Elmendorf–Richardson. However, secession talks began again in 2019 from a small group of community members.

== Geography ==
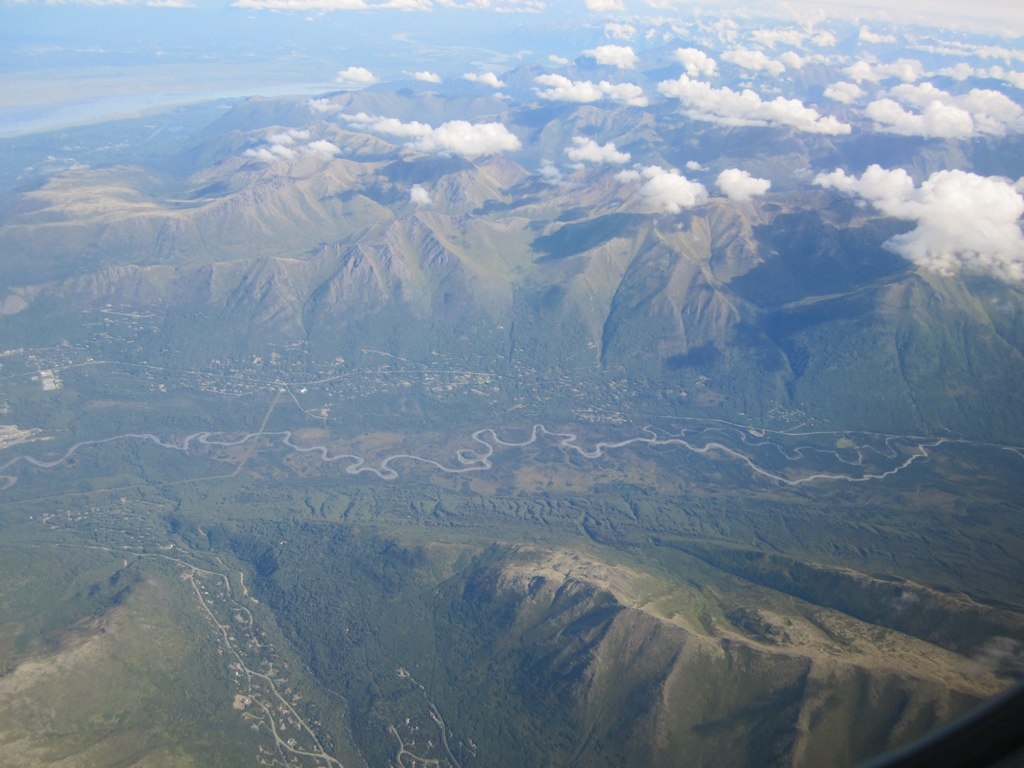
Upper Eagle River valley, with Hiland Road neighborhoods in the left foreground and the Chugach Mountains in the background.

Mount Baldy, a 3,218-foot peak in Chugach State Park is a popular hiking and hang-gliding area.

The Eagle River runs through the southern end of the community.

Neighborhoods along the Glenn Highway and Old Glenn Highway corridor are level or sloping, rising towards the Chugach Mountains east of the Old Glenn Highway. The remainder of the community lies along the canyon of the Eagle River; some neighborhoods built in the late 20th century and early 21st century near the Briggs Bridge are built very close to the bottom of the canyon. Neighborhoods along the northern portions of Eagle River, plus Hiland Road and Eagle River Road east of the curve where the road leaves the section line and descends into the canyon, mainly consist of houses built across the mountainsides. Wallace Mountain, on the far northeast corner of the community's road system, is home to several radio station transmitters and towers at the 1,900 feet (580 m) level.

=== Climate ===
Eagle River's average temperatures in January range from 6 °F (−14 °C) to 20 °F (−7 °C); in summer, temperatures range from 50 °F (10 °C) to 70 °F (21 °C). Annual precipitation is 15.9 inches (40 cm), with 69 inches (180 cm) of snowfall. The bulk of the snowfall is usually from mid-October through December, with fewer snowstorms from January through April. On average, the area experiences 2 to 3 "chinooks" - a warm, dry wind that melts much of the snow and creates a minor thaw - during the winter months. Springtime is generally referred to as "break up" in the area and further north, referring to the breaking up of the ice on rivers and lakes. Local lore holds that seedlings should not be planted outdoors until after Memorial Day in May, and even then temperatures should be watched for light frost until June.

Climate data for Eagle River, Alaska
Month	Jan	Feb	Mar	Apr	May	Jun	Jul	Aug	Sep	Oct	Nov	Dec	Year
Record high °F (°C)	50 (10)	52 (11)	55 (13)	70 (21)	77 (25)	84 (29)	83 (28)	84 (29)	70 (21)	65 (18)	55 (13)	53 (12)	84 (29)
Mean daily maximum °F (°C)	22 (−6)	26 (−3)	34 (1)	44 (7)	54 (12)	62 (17)	65 (18)	63 (17)	55 (13)	40 (4)	27 (−3)	23 (−5)	43 (6)
Mean daily minimum °F (°C)	9 (−13)	11 (−12)	16 (−9)	27 (−3)	37 (3)	45 (7)	49 (9)	47 (8)	39 (4)	26 (−3)	14 (−10)	11 (−12)	28 (−3)
Record low °F (°C)	−23 (−31)	−29 (−34)	−17 (−27)	−5 (−21)	20 (−7)	33 (1)	40 (4)	32 (0)	16 (−9)	−3 (−19)	−18 (−28)	−18 (−28)	−29 (−34)
Average precipitation inches (mm)	0.60 (15)	0.74 (19)	0.71 (18)	0.33 (8.4)	0.64 (16)	1.00 (25)	2.02 (51)	2.37 (60)	2.45 (62)	1.75 (44)	1.11 (28)	1.34 (34)	15.06 (380.4)

Climate data for Eagle River Gakona Circle, Alaska, 1991–2020 normals: 567ft (173m)
Month	Jan	Feb	Mar	Apr	May	Jun	Jul	Aug	Sep	Oct	Nov	Dec	Year
Mean daily maximum °F (°C)	20.3 (−6.5)	26.9 (−2.8)	33.4 (0.8)	46.2 (7.9)	58.0 (14.4)	64.4 (18.0)	66.7 (19.3)	63.2 (17.3)	53.5 (11.9)	39.9 (4.4)	25.5 (−3.6)	22.0 (−5.6)	43.3 (6.3)
Daily mean °F (°C)	14.7 (−9.6)	20.1 (−6.6)	24.9 (−3.9)	37.5 (3.1)	48.0 (8.9)	55.1 (12.8)	58.5 (14.7)	55.6 (13.1)	46.9 (8.3)	34.1 (1.2)	20.6 (−6.3)	16.8 (−8.4)	36.1 (2.3)
Mean daily minimum °F (°C)	9.2 (−12.7)	13.4 (−10.3)	16.4 (−8.7)	28.8 (−1.8)	38.0 (3.3)	45.8 (7.7)	50.3 (10.2)	48.0 (8.9)	40.4 (4.7)	28.4 (−2.0)	15.7 (−9.1)	11.6 (−11.3)	28.8 (−1.8)
Average precipitation inches (mm)	0.97 (25)	1.13 (29)	0.85 (22)	0.55 (14)	0.90 (23)	1.14 (29)	2.09 (53)	2.82 (72)	2.67 (68)	1.74 (44)	1.58 (40)	1.23 (31)	17.67 (450)
Average snowfall inches (cm)	12.50 (31.8)	11.70 (29.7)	8.90 (22.6)	4.50 (11.4)	0.40 (1.0)	0.00 (0.00)	0.00 (0.00)	0.00 (0.00)	0.40 (1.0)	3.50 (8.9)	12.30 (31.2)	16.30 (41.4)	70.5 (179)
Source: NOAA

Climate data for Eagle River Nature Centre, Alaska, 1991–2020 normals, 2007-2020 snowfall: 520ft (158m)
Month	Jan	Feb	Mar	Apr	May	Jun	Jul	Aug	Sep	Oct	Nov	Dec	Year
Mean daily maximum °F (°C)	20.9 (−6.2)	28.0 (−2.2)	35.3 (1.8)	47.1 (8.4)	58.0 (14.4)	65.4 (18.6)	67.4 (19.7)	64.5 (18.1)	56.0 (13.3)	42.1 (5.6)	26.4 (−3.1)	23.3 (−4.8)	44.5 (7.0)
Daily mean °F (°C)	13.7 (−10.2)	19.8 (−6.8)	25.0 (−3.9)	36.8 (2.7)	46.9 (8.3)	54.6 (12.6)	57.7 (14.3)	54.7 (12.6)	46.6 (8.1)	33.9 (1.1)	19.7 (−6.8)	16.1 (−8.8)	35.5 (1.9)
Mean daily minimum °F (°C)	6.4 (−14.2)	11.6 (−11.3)	14.7 (−9.6)	26.5 (−3.1)	35.7 (2.1)	43.7 (6.5)	47.9 (8.8)	44.9 (7.2)	37.2 (2.9)	25.7 (−3.5)	12.9 (−10.6)	8.9 (−12.8)	26.3 (−3.1)
Average precipitation inches (mm)	2.26 (57)	1.64 (42)	1.56 (40)	0.76 (19)	0.94 (24)	1.31 (33)	1.68 (43)	2.62 (67)	3.64 (92)	2.46 (62)	1.72 (44)	1.96 (50)	22.55 (573)
Average snowfall inches (cm)	12.1 (31)	16.0 (41)	9.7 (25)	6.4 (16)	0.5 (1.3)	0.0 (0.0)	0.0 (0.0)	0.0 (0.0)	0.6 (1.5)	3.6 (9.1)	11.6 (29)	18.0 (46)	78.5 (199.9)
Source 1: NOAA
Source 2: XMACIS2 (snowfall)

== Demographics ==
Historical population
Census	Pop.	Note	%±
1960	130		—
1970	2,437		1,774.6%
U.S. Decennial Census

Eagle River first appeared on the 1960 U.S. Census as an unincorporated village, and again in 1970. It was annexed into Anchorage in 1975.

The 2000 census found a population of 22,236 in Eagle River and an additional 8,000 in the settlements northeast of Eagle River: Chugiak, Birchwood, Peters Creek, Thunderbird Falls and Eklutna. About 30,000 people live in the Eagle River and Chugiak areas, on both sides of the Glenn Highway. Many personnel from Joint Base Elmendorf-Richardson (and formerly from their predecessors, Fort Richardson and Elmendorf Air Force Base) live in Eagle River, and many of the area's civilian residents additionally commute to jobs in the Anchorage Bowl.

== Economy ==
Eagle River is the shopping hub between Anchorage and the smaller Mat-Su cities, Palmer and Wasilla. The last decade has seen two major improvements in local services: shopping and the availability of medical and dental services. The number of local restaurants available almost doubled over the same 10-year span. The local movie theater reopened in 2006 with six screens, then closed down in December 2011. As of 2006, leading industries in the community were the service industry, followed by trade (retail) and government (mainly working at public schools for the Anchorage School District).

Some local homes and businesses were heavily damaged during the 2018 Anchorage earthquake and had to be repaired and renovated or abandoned. Gruening Middle School and Eagle River Elementary School had to close down for the remainder of the school year due to damage.

== Arts and culture ==
Annual community events include a Fourth of July celebration held at Lion's Park, and the Bear Paw Festival, which is in July and is celebrated with multiple events throughout Eagle River.

The Bear Paw Festival kicks off on Thursday evening with the Miss Bear Paw pageant held at the Steve Primis Auditorium at Chugiak High School. This scholarship pageant sponsored by the Chugiak-Eagle River Chamber of Commerce also presents awards for Bear Paw Princess, Official Escort, Best Costume with an Alaskan Theme and Miss Congeniality. The Sleeping Lady Mountain Lions Club provides a Community Service Award scholarship. Saturday morning there is a 5k foot race, followed by a parade. A Renaissance anachronistic group does performances on Saturdays and Sundays.

== Education ==
Eagle River has numerous public, parochial and charter school programs available for K-12 grades. The public school district is the Anchorage School District (ASD). ASD schools serving Eagle River are: Eagle River Elementary, Ravenwood Elementary, Alpenglow Elementary, Homestead Elementary, Firelake Elementary, Chugiak Elementary, and Birchwood Elementary, Gruening Middle School, Mirror Lake Middle School, Eagle River High School, and Chugiak High School (which is located northeast of town). (The town is zoned such that roughly half of local public high school students go to Eagle River High School; the other half attends Chugiak High School. However, due to damage from the 2018 Anchorage earthquake, Eagle River Elementary and Gruening Middle School, officials closed both schools for repairs through at least the 2019-2020 school year, with displaced students accommodated by other ASD schools. Both schools are currently open for the 2021–22 school year. Homeschooling is also a popular form of education in the area, both through home-based charter schools and independently.

The University of Alaska Anchorage provides classes in the area and formerly had a campus at the Eagle Center building, adjacent to the middle Glenn Highway interchange. In 2019, the university chose not to renew its lease, but continues to provide classes at local public school locations. There is also a local bible college.

== Sports ==
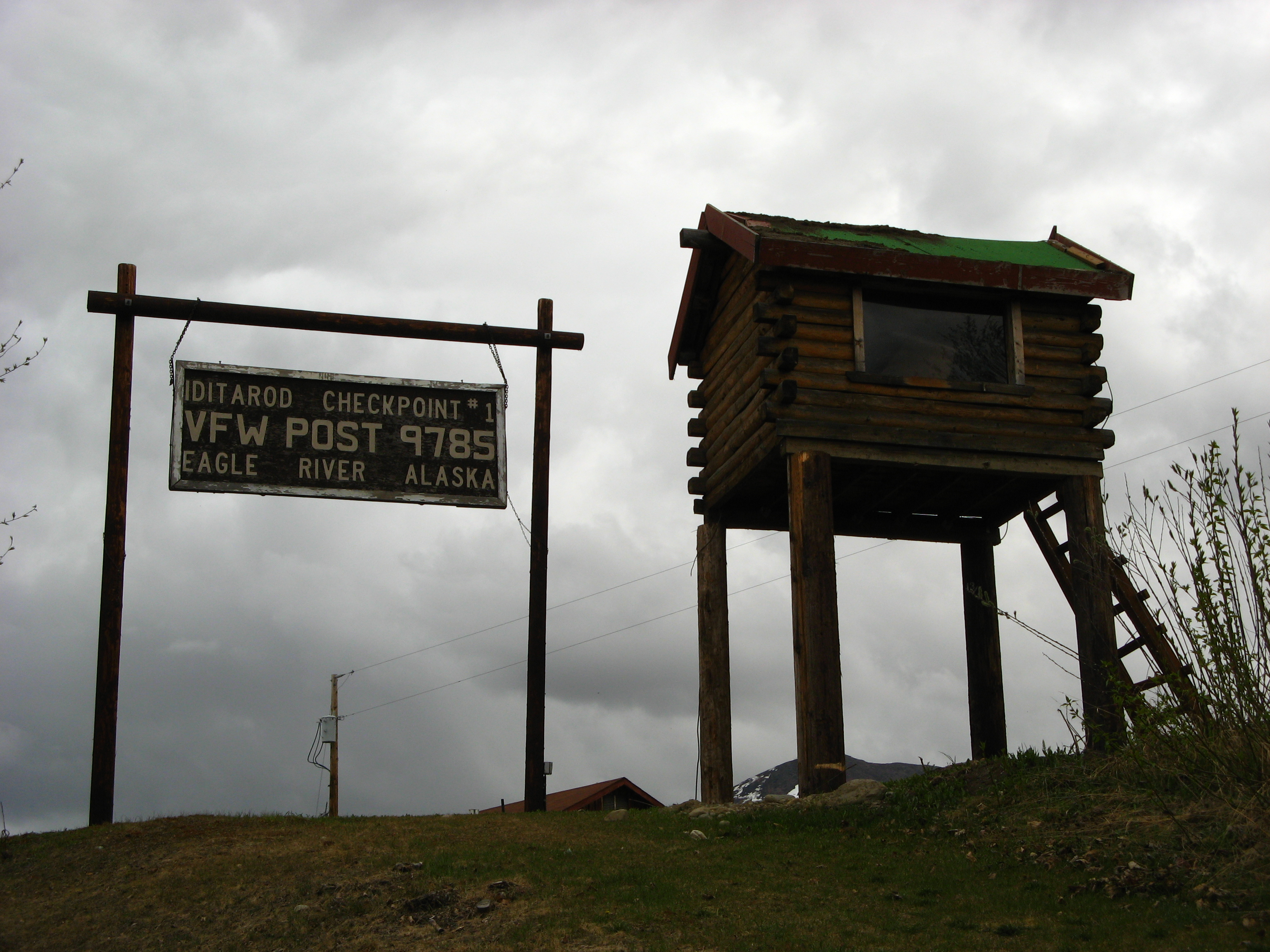
VFW Post 9785, located near the middle Glenn Highway interchange, serves as the first checkpoint for the Iditarod Trail Sled Dog Race.

There is a lot of local interest in sports: hockey, both indoor and outdoor soccer, baseball, softball, basketball, football, swimming/diving, hiking, and cross-country running and skiing. A bike trail runs alongside the Glenn Highway from Anchorage past Eagle River and to Chugiak. Sidewalks are available and kept clear most of the winter in the downtown area for walking and jogging along the Old Glenn Highway and Business Boulevard. Cross-country skiing trails are available along Birchwood Road near Chugiak High School and recently trails have been put in around Eagle River High School. Hockey, figure skating, leisure skating, and indoor soccer are available at the Harry J. McDonald Memorial Center, which hosted seven games at the 1989 World Junior Ice Hockey Championships. Outdoor soccer is available at the Russell Oberg Soccer Complex. Chugiak Youth Sports Association (CYSA) is a local non-profit organization that offers recreational team sport opportunities to the youth of Chugiak and Eagle River including soccer, basketball, volleyball and flag football. Eagle River Soccer Club (ERSC) provides pre-competitive soccer (U9 and U10) and recreational youth and adult leagues. Chugiak Soccer Club (CSC) provides competitive soccer for U11-U19 soccer players.

Popular local activities include rafting, hiking, skiing and exploring the mountains. One of the more popular local hikes is up Mount Baldy, which overlooks the town. There is little fishing in the river, but anglers do gather at Fire and Mirror Lakes.

The 1996 Arctic Winter Games were held in Chugiak and Eagle River.

== Media ==
The Chugiak-Eagle River Star is a weekly newspaper that serves Eagle River, Chugiak, Eklutna, Peters Creek and Birchwood. The newspaper was founded in 1971 by Lee B. Jordan, who for decades remained active in the community as an authority on local history. He died in 2018.

The Star is part of the Binkley Company family of newspapers and shares reporting resources with its nearby sister publication, the Anchorage Daily News.

From 1958 through 1973, The Knik Arm Courier covered the area. The Chugiak-Eagle River Historical Society maintains an online archives, saying, "The Knik Arm Courier, established by James and Marie McDowell in 1958, was published through 1973 and is a reliable source of information from that period in Chugiak-Eagle River’s history."
