= Eagle River (Cook Inlet) =

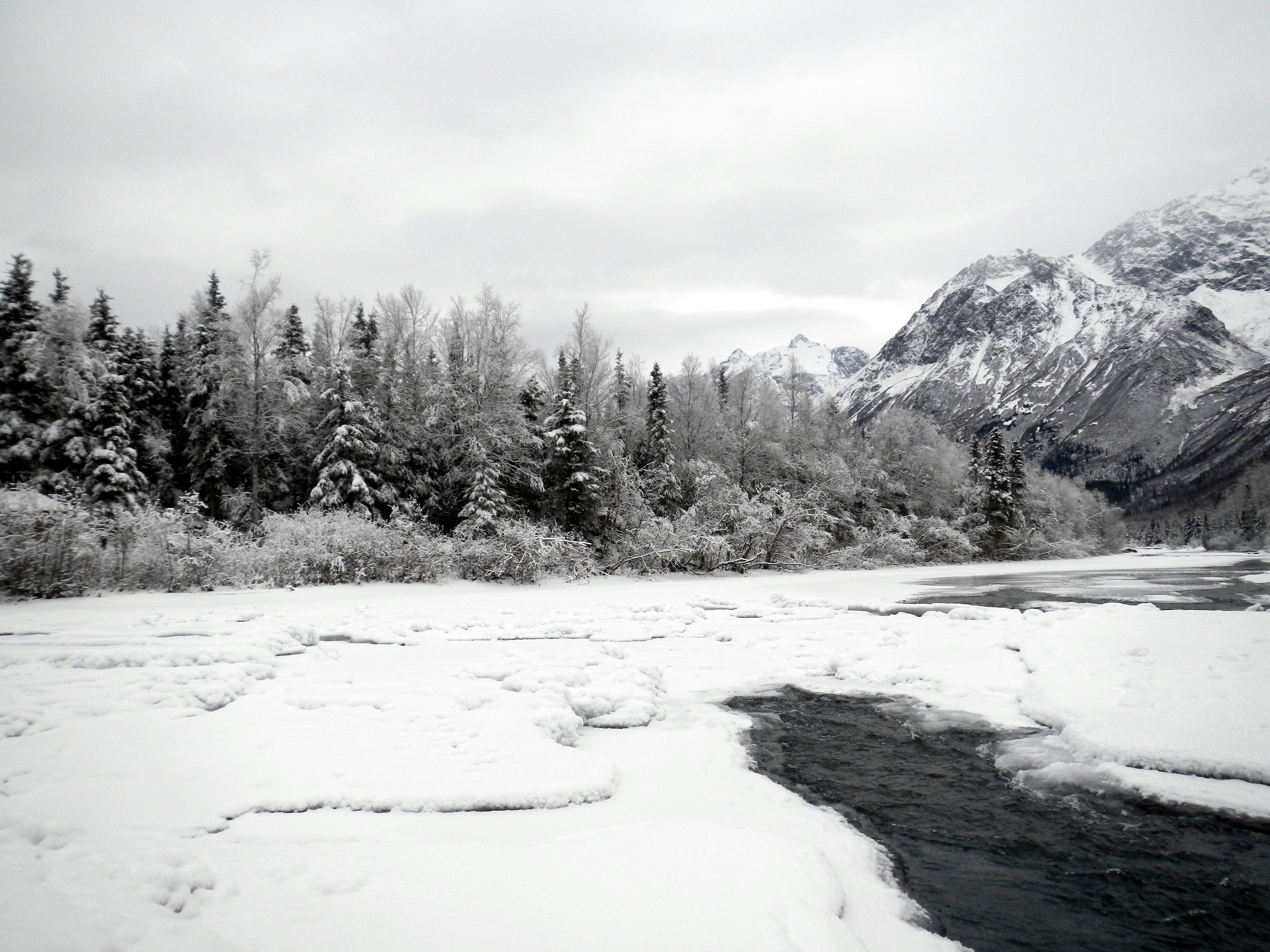
- Eagle River in winter.(Chugach State Park)

- Location of where Eagle River (Alaska) feeds into the Cook Inlet.

Location
- Country: United States
- State: Alaska
- Municipality: Municipality of Anchorage

Physical characteristics
- Source: Eagle Glacier
  - location: Chugach Mountains, Alaska
  - coordinates: 61°07′43″N 149°03′57″W
  - elevation: 958 ft (292 m)
- Mouth: Eagle Bay, Knik Arm, Cook Inlet
  - location: 9 miles (14 km) northeast of downtown Anchorage, Within Joint Base Elmendorf-Richardson
  - coordinates: 61°19′43″N 149°44′19″W
  - elevation: 0 ft (0 m)
- Length: 40 mi (64 km)
- Basin size: 192 sq mi (500 km^{2})
- Discharge
  - location: Eagle River
  - average: 527 cu ft/s (14.9 m^{3}/s)

The Eagle River is a stream, 40 miles (64 km) long, in Anchorage, Alaska. Heading at Eagle Glacier in Chugach State Park, it flows northwest into Eagle Bay on the Knik Arm of Cook Inlet, 9 miles (14 km) northeast of downtown Anchorage.

== Course ==
Beginning at Eagle Glacier in Chugach State Park, the river soon intersects the Iditarod National Historic Trail, which follows the Eagle River Valley from near Crow Pass in Chugach National Forest to the community of Eagle River. Downstream of the trail crossing, the river flows by, but at considerable distance from, the Eagle River Nature Center, the visitor center for the park. The nature center lies along the North Fork Eagle River, which runs roughly parallel to the main stem for several miles. Eagle River Road, like the North Fork, lies to the right of the main stem, facing downstream. Eagle River Road links the visitor center to the Eagle River community 12 miles (19 km) away.

After receiving the North Fork from the right, the Eagle River receives the South Fork Eagle River from the left before passing under Eagle River Loop Road. On its lower reaches, the river flows by the Eagle River community, which is on the right, and Eagle River Campground, on the left, before leaving the state park. It then passes under Glenn Highway and flows through Joint Base Elmendorf-Richardson, a military reservation, to Eagle Bay on Cook Inlet.

== Boating ==
Parts of the Eagle River are floatable in a variety of watercraft. These sections are rated from Class I (easy) to Class III (difficult) on the International Scale of River Difficulty. Reaching a put-in place on the main stem west of the visitor center involves an arduous portage. A more accessible put-in place lies along the North Fork and Eagle River Road not far above the confluence with the main stem. Dangers include Class II (medium) and Class III rapids near Eagle River Campground, overhanging or submerged vegetation, and logjams.

== Eagle River Nature Center ==
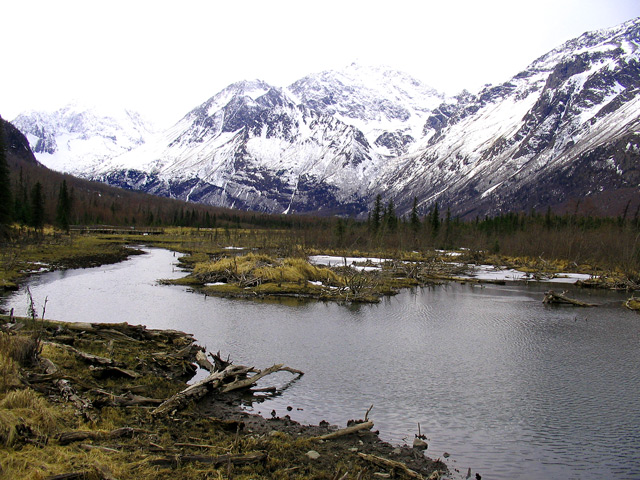
View of the Chugach Mountains near the Eagle River Nature Center.

The Eagle River Nature Center, which sits at an entrance to Chugach State Park, is 12 miles (19 km) up Eagle River Road. The center (in conjunction with "friends of") run numerous educational programs aimed at bringing people closer to nature through education and outdoor excursions.

The historic Crow Pass Trail, which runs 26 miles (42 km) from the Eagle River Nature Center and ends near the town of Girdwood, remains a favorite backpacking trip.

=== Climate ===
Climate data for Eagle River Nature Centre, Alaska, 1991–2020 normals: 520ft (158m)
Month	Jan	Feb	Mar	Apr	May	Jun	Jul	Aug	Sep	Oct	Nov	Dec	Year
Mean daily maximum °F (°C)	20.9 (−6.2)	28.0 (−2.2)	35.3 (1.8)	47.1 (8.4)	58.0 (14.4)	65.4 (18.6)	67.4 (19.7)	64.5 (18.1)	56.0 (13.3)	42.1 (5.6)	26.4 (−3.1)	23.3 (−4.8)	44.5 (7.0)
Daily mean °F (°C)	13.7 (−10.2)	19.8 (−6.8)	25.0 (−3.9)	36.8 (2.7)	46.9 (8.3)	54.6 (12.6)	57.7 (14.3)	54.7 (12.6)	46.6 (8.1)	33.9 (1.1)	19.7 (−6.8)	16.1 (−8.8)	35.5 (1.9)
Mean daily minimum °F (°C)	6.4 (−14.2)	11.6 (−11.3)	14.7 (−9.6)	26.5 (−3.1)	35.7 (2.1)	43.7 (6.5)	47.9 (8.8)	44.9 (7.2)	37.2 (2.9)	25.7 (−3.5)	12.9 (−10.6)	8.9 (−12.8)	26.3 (−3.1)
Average precipitation inches (mm)	2.26 (57)	1.64 (42)	1.56 (40)	0.76 (19)	0.94 (24)	1.31 (33)	1.68 (43)	2.62 (67)	3.64 (92)	2.46 (62)	1.72 (44)	1.96 (50)	22.55 (573)
Source: NOAA

== See also ==
- List of rivers of Alaska
