= Chugiak, Anchorage =

Unincorporated community in Alaska, United States

Coordinates: 61°23′20″N 149°28′55″W

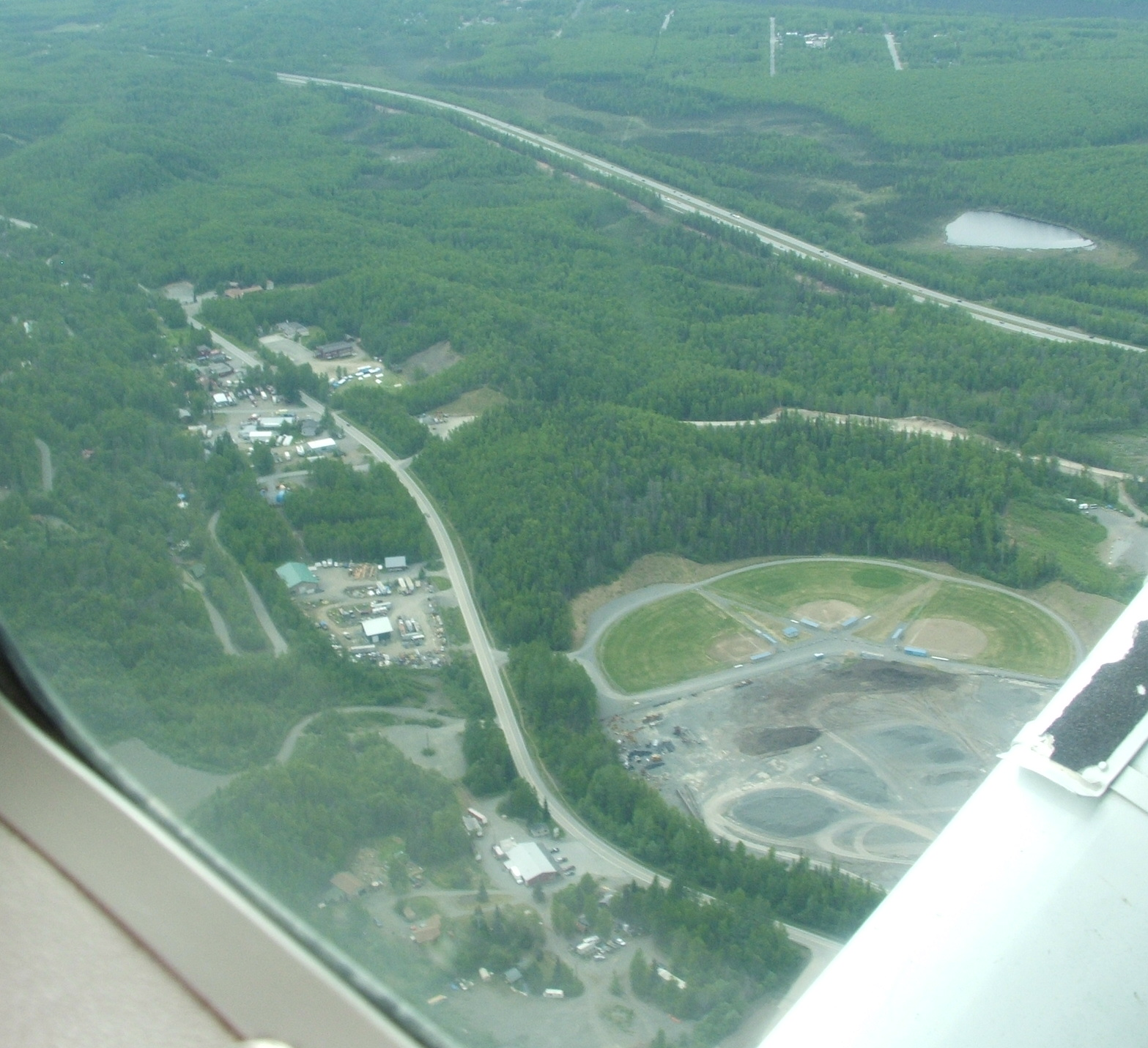
Aerial view of Chugiak in June 2006. The main commercial strip along the Old Glenn Highway and Loretta French Park comprise the foreground of the view.

Chugiak (/ˈtʃuːɡiːæk/) is an unincorporated community in Anchorage, Alaska, situated approximately 20 miles (32 km) northeast of downtown Anchorage.

== Geography ==
Chugiak is located between Eagle River to the south and Eklutna to the north, and between Knik Arm to the west and Chugach State Park to the east, where the Chugach Mountains lie.

== History ==
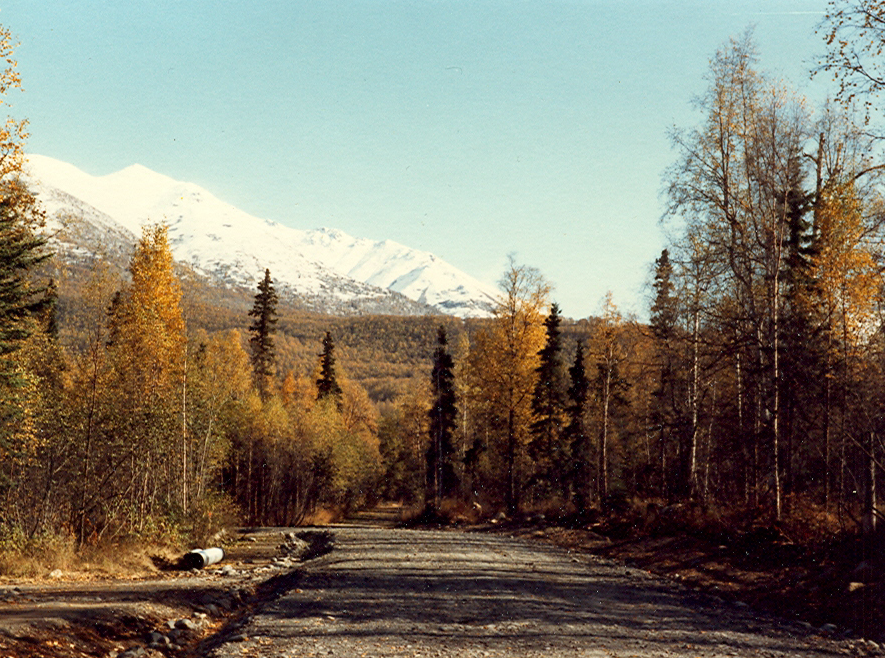
Needels Loop, near the intersection of the Old Glenn Highway and North Birchwood Loop Road, in 1982. The street has since been paved.

The settlement along the Palmer Highway in an area that had been home to Denai’ina Athabascans for thousands of years was named "Chugiak" on February 17, 1947, by pioneering white residents. "Chugiak" is said to have come from a Dena'ina Athabascan word meaning "place of many places". Chugiak was first heavily settled in the 1950s, primarily by the homesteading by former military personnel who had served in Alaska during World War II. It is currently one of the main sites of suburban expansion near Anchorage.

== Demographics ==
Historical population
Census	Pop.	Note	%±
1960	51		—
1970	489		858.8%
U.S. Decennial Census

Chugiak first appeared on the 1960 U.S. Census as an unincorporated village. It reported again in 1970. In 1975, it merged with the city of Anchorage.

== Present day ==
There are about 10,000 residents, most of whom work in Anchorage or the Matanuska-Susitna Valley, and are spread out mainly along the Glenn Highway. The urban cluster of Anchorage Northeast (including Chugiak and surroundings) has an estimated population of 31,000 (2010), covering an area of 15 square miles (39 km^{2}).

Chugiak is also the home of the "Birchwood Shooting & Recreational Park", (adjacent to the Birchwood Airport), the largest rifle, pistol, and shotgun range facility in the State of Alaska. The annual Alaska State Trap and Skeet competitions are held there.

Chugiak has its own post office, with United States postal zip code 99567, which also serves the adjacent small unincorporated communities of Birchwood, Peters Creek, and Eklutna.

== Notable people ==
- Nick Begich III, U.S. representative
- Kate Earl, singer-songwriter

== See also ==
- Chugiak High School
