= Schools at War =

American WWII student program

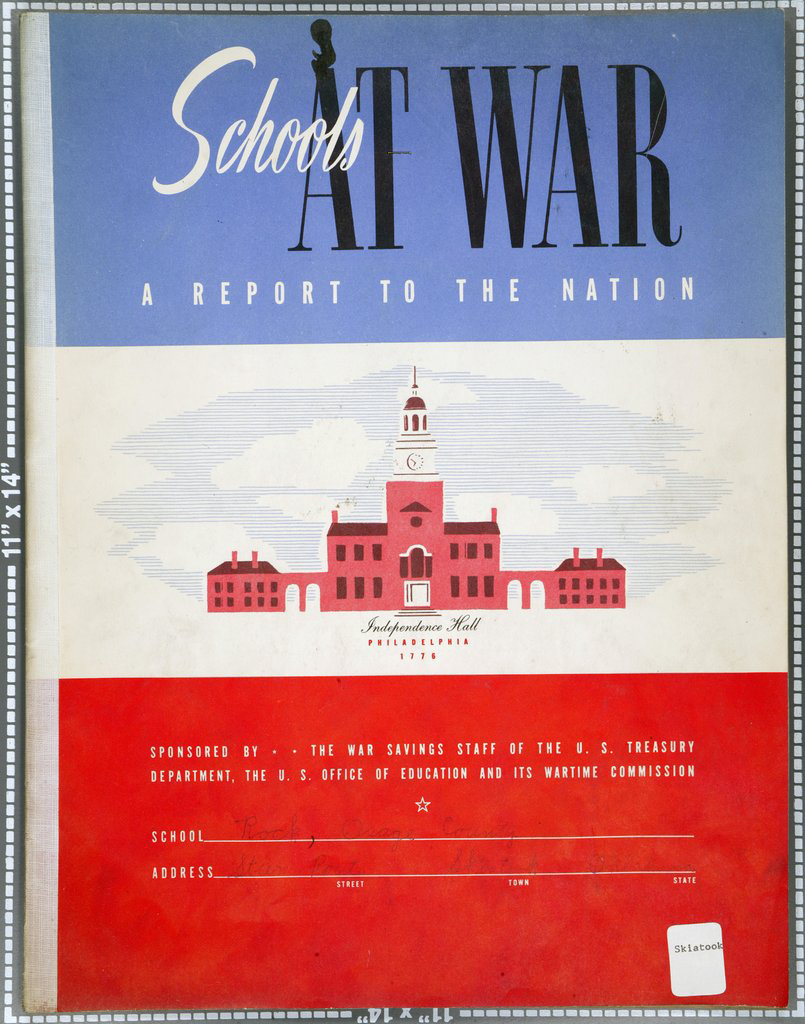
- U.S. WWII Schools at War Scrapbook
- Duration: 1942–1945
- Location: Washington, D.C.
- Type: Government program
- Theme: "Save, Serve, and Conserve"
- Motive: World War II fundraising and other support
- Organized by: U.S. Treasury Department; U.S. Office of Education
- Participants: 200,000 schools, 30 million school children
- Outcome: Raised over US$2 billion
- Jeeps sponsored: At least 90,000
- Airplanes sponsored: Several thousand

The American Schools at War program was a program during World War II run by the U.S. Treasury Department, in which schoolchildren set goals to sell stamps and bonds to help the war effort. The program was also administered by the U.S. Office of Education, the Federal government agency that interfaced with the nation's school systems and its thirty-two million students. The Office, however, allowed the Treasury to work with the schools directly as the main objective of the program was raising money.

Planning for the program began before the December 1941 United States declaration of war on Japan. It started in earnest with the 1942–1943 school year. Students were taught that they could support the war effort in several ways. Their most important contribution was financial. Students bought war stamps and bonds with their spare change or earnings. However, more significantly, they were a sales force of millions selling to their families, neighbors, and communities. By the end of the war, they had raised over $2 billion (equivalent to $36.6 billion in 2025).

Schools at War supplied literature to teachers and posters that encouraged all aspects of the program. Individual schools were incentivized with a special flag to reach 90 percent student participation. School sponsorship of a particular item, such as a jeep or airplane, motivated sales. Tens of thousands of jeeps and hundreds of planes were "bought" under the program.

== Formation ==
The program was initially patterned on prior school savings programs. The Thrift stamp program of World War I facilitated, with 25-cent stamps, small-scale savings by children towards the eventual purchase of a larger five-dollar War Savings Certificate. The post-war period also saw the growth of the school savings bank movement, in which children were encouraged to save money by opening and regularly depositing into savings bank accounts through the school. The idea of a school saving program for World War II began before the U.S. entered the war. In July 1941, John W. Studebaker, the U.S. Commissioner of Education, outlined the cooperation between the Office of Education and the Treasury. The Treasury also cooperated on the Schools at War program with private organizations like the National Education Association, the American Council on Education, and the National Catholic Welfare Conference. The program was further refined in the spring of 1942 with the development of various publications about saving and conserving under wartime conditions. Early pamphlets included:

- Stamps: How They Help Uncle Sam
- What You Should Know About U.S. Savings Stamps and Bonds

== Purpose ==
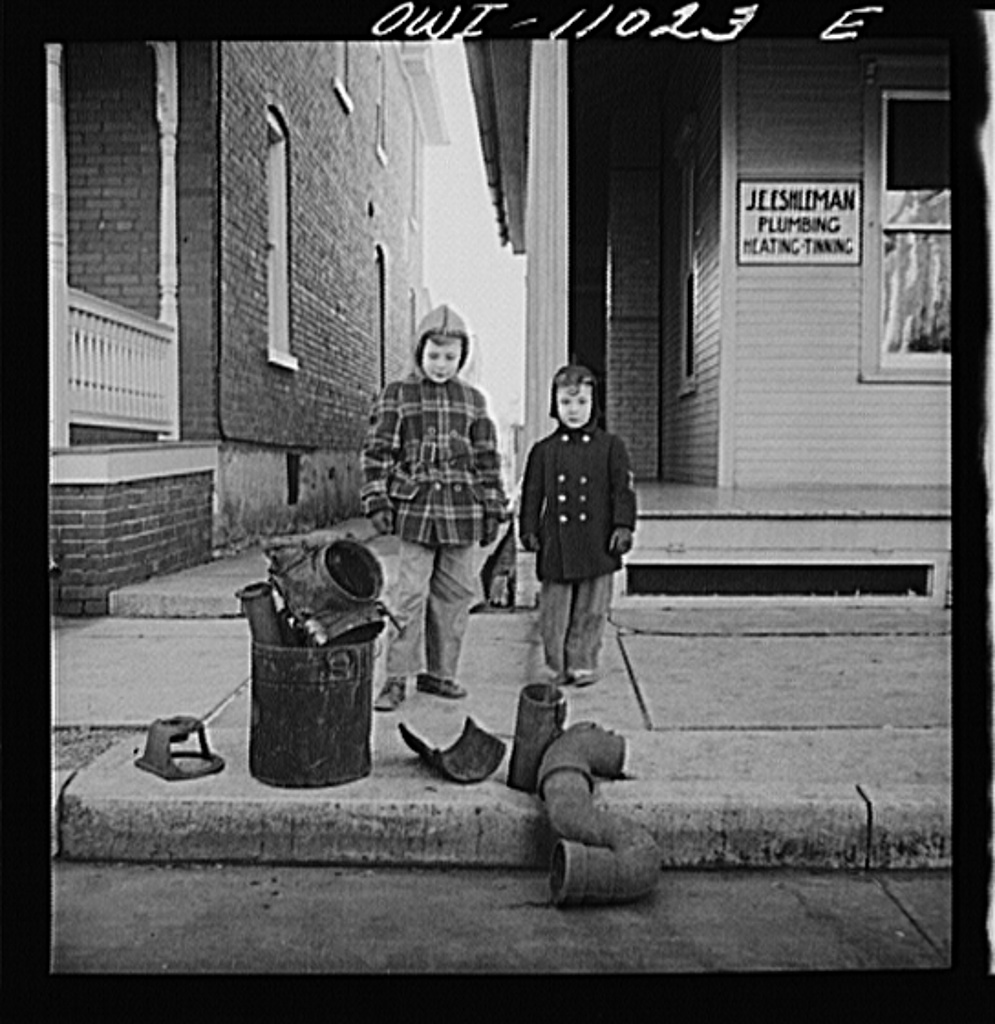
Children with scrap metal in Lititz, Pennsylvania, November 1942

The Schools at War program was led by the director of the education division of the War Savings Staff of the Treasury Department, Homer W. Anderson, and was intended to unify and coordinate the effort of 30 million school children in support of the war effort. Children were expected to provide direct financial aid, as well as indirect support by receiving instruction in "good citizenship" and the "preservation of democracy". Teaching thrift, conservation, and war finance was considered "educationally sound" and therefore not in conflict with the schools' primary function.

The program used the slogan "Save, Serve, and Conserve". "Save" meant students were asked to save money to buy war saving stamps and bonds to pay for war material. "Serve" meant directly training in or performing war-related tasks such as providing first-aid, radio/telegraph communication, firefighting, enemy plane spotting, childcare, etc. "Conserve" referred to the wartime collection of materials such as scrap metal and rubber, aluminum, paper, string, cloth, kitchen fat, as well as reducing waste by repairing and reusing items like shoes and clothes.

According to a pamphlet published by the Treasury and Education Office, the program was meant to encourage schools to participate in the war effort, publicize their contributions through local, state, and national exhibitions, and recognize schools with program awards. A 1942 article published by the War Savings Staff of the Treasury Department said that the United States was fighting a "total war" in which every "man, woman, and child" was "in the fight". The Schools at War program was intended to "intensify and unify" the efforts of schools and students to make their activities "appear more vital" and see "the importance of his own contribution".

== Operation ==
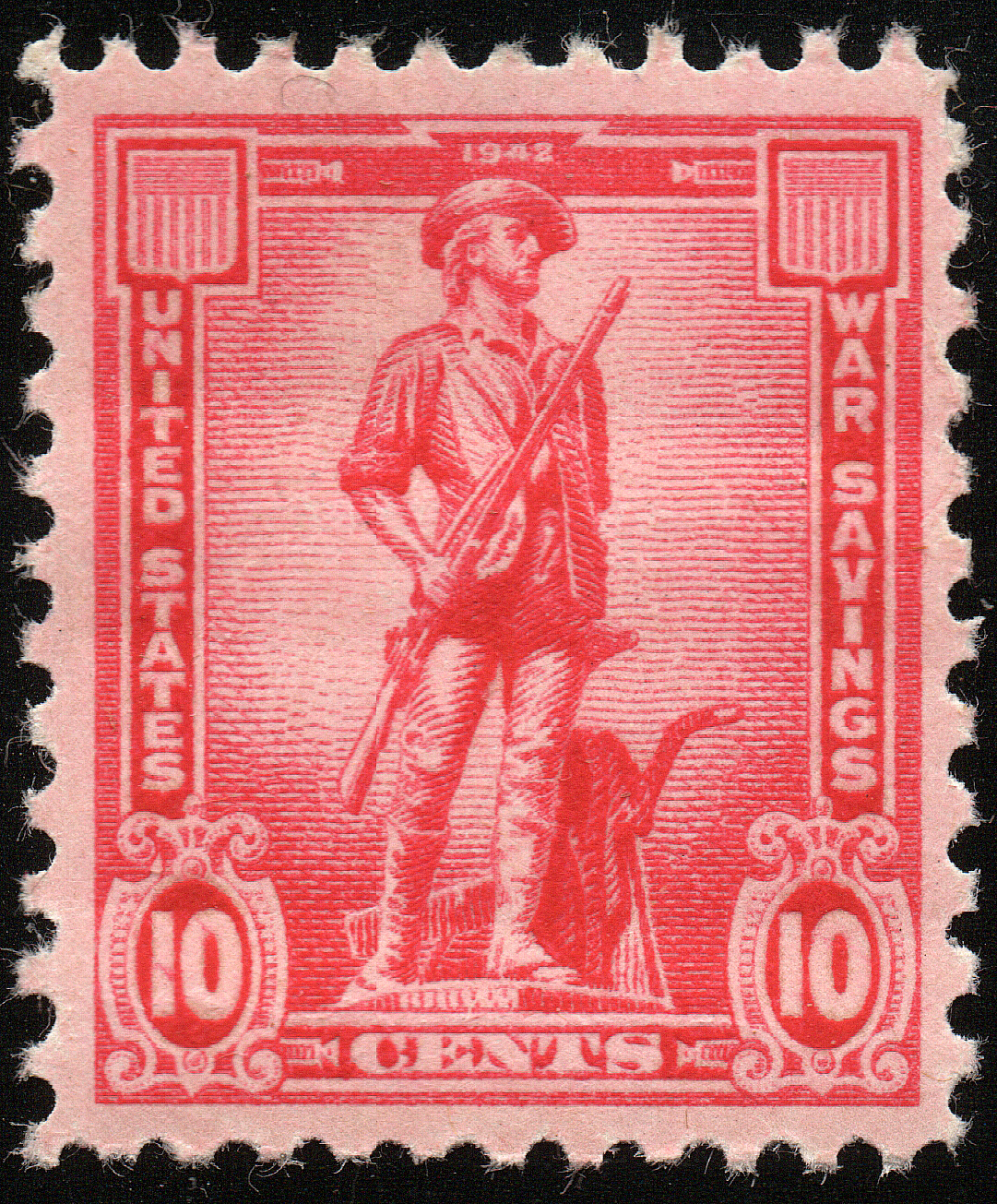
1942 War Savings Stamp

Approximately ten months after the United States entered World War II upon the attack on Pearl Harbor, the program was inaugurated on September 25, 1942, with a parade in Washington, D.C., in which over 4,000 children marched to the U.S. Treasury Building to be greeted by first lady Eleanor Roosevelt, assistant Treasury Secretary Henry Morgenthau Jr, and John W. Studebaker, the U.S. Commissioner of Education. The program was in full operation in fall 1942, led by Homer W. Anderson, who had been the Superintendent of Public Instruction for St. Louis, Missouri. He was succeeded after a year by Daniel Melcher for the remainder of the war.

A school was formally enlisted in the program by returning a postcard. Activity was tracked in a "scrapbook", which could include a "written, pictorial, and statistical report" of the school's war-related activities and participation in the War Savings Program, and could be exhibited to the public. The scrapbooks were to be completed by January 7 to provide a prior year report to augment the president's annual State of the Union report. State exhibits of the scrapbooks were held on or about Washington's Birthday. The Treasury selected some scrapbooks, including that of Escanaba Senior High School in Delta County, Michigan, to be sent to schools in England to show students there how American students were supporting the war effort.

Every participating school would receive a "Certificate of Service" if its program sufficiently "stimulate[d] the regular voluntary purchase of War Stamps and Bonds by students and teachers". Every state was presented a "Liberty Brick" as further recognition of their schools' war services. The bricks were originally used in the construction of Independence Hall in Philadelphia that were replaced during a renovation, and were intended to be permanently displayed in the state capitals.

The smallest denomination war bond cost $18.75, redeemable after ten years for $25. Stamps were issued in denominations of 10, 25, and 50 cents which were purchased at face value and earned no interest. They were intended to be used as a savings mechanism to purchase a war bond eventually; savings books were provided which, when filled, held $18.75 in stamps, which then could be exchanged for a bond. The ten-cent stamps were issued primarily to encourage the participation of children.

== Publications ==
The program published a quarterly journal titled Schools At War distributed to nearly every schoolteacher in the country. The journal functioned to provide methods to encourage stamp sales, publicize goals and progress. Other publications included teaching aids:

- The Teacher of Mathematics and the War Savings Program
- The Teacher of English and the War Savings Program
- Paying for the War: A Resource Unit for Social Studies Teachers
- War Savings Programs for Schools at War (largely plays)
- Art in the Service of Schools at War

Lesson plans were developed in all grades to stress thrift and conservation. Students were instructed to buy war stamps, collect scrap, help with recycling drives and with victory gardens, and encourage their parents and neighbors to do the same. The program supplied plays that schools could perform and music that school choirs could sing to encourage stamp and bond purchases. Patriotic songs in an official Schools at War songbook were written by changing the lyrics of common tunes.

In the "Art" bulletin, art teachers were told to "assign war-related projects regularly" and to "put the results to work where many will see them". Art classes were still to be instructional, but the projects were to have secondary benefits in aiding war activities of the school and their communities. Projects included inspirational posters, progress charts, murals, exhibits, maps, displays, and more.

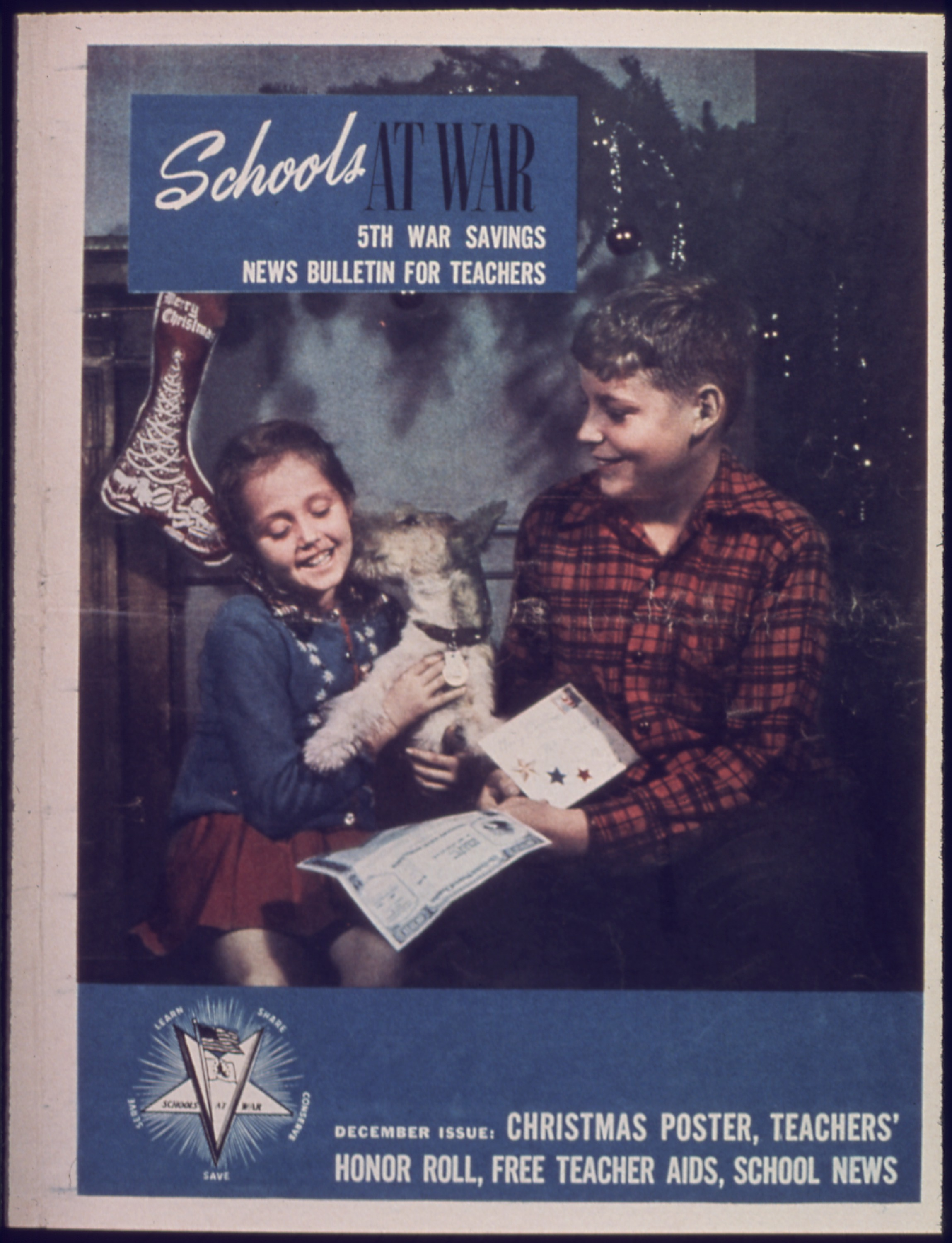
5th Schools At War, December 1943

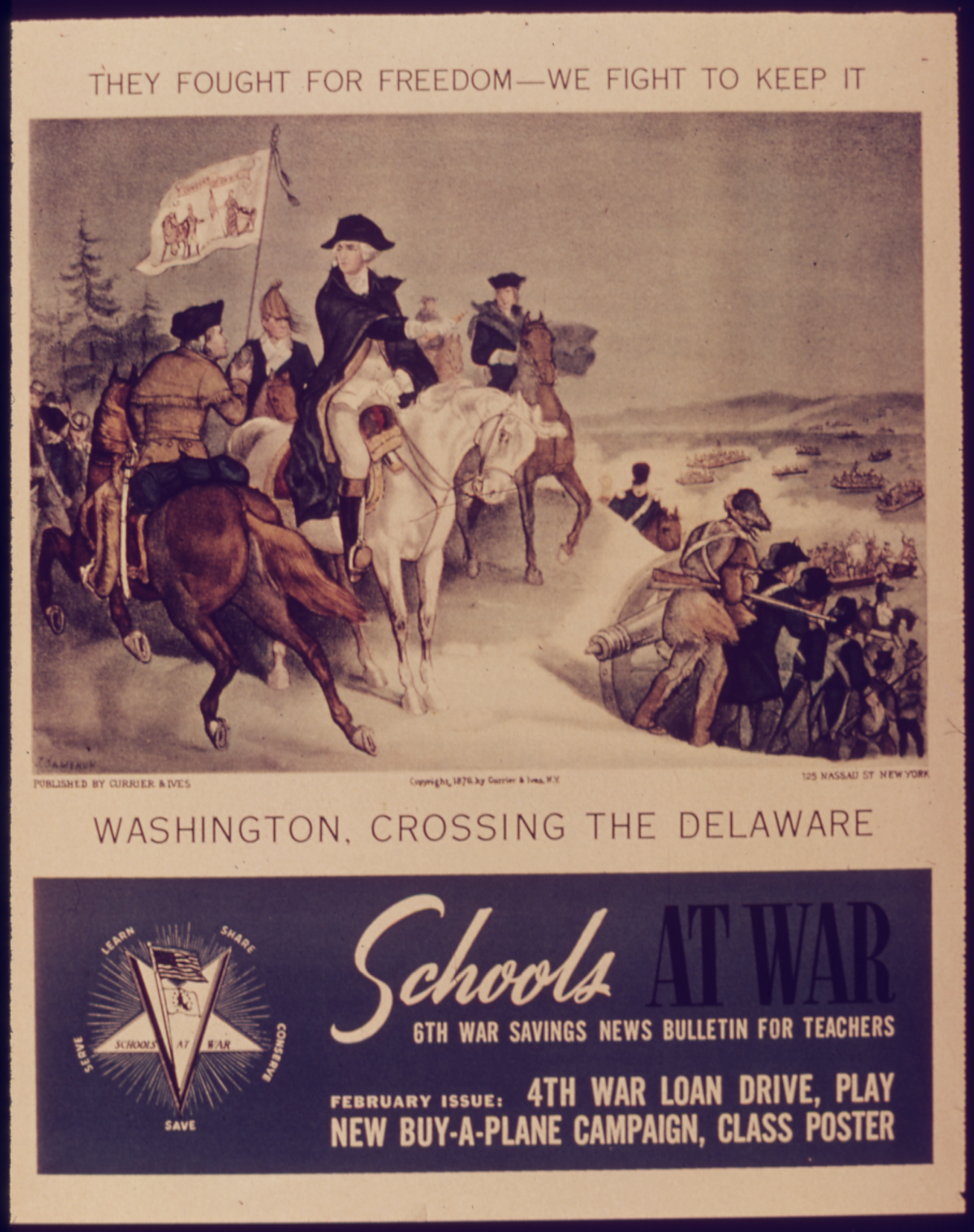
6th Schools At War February 1944

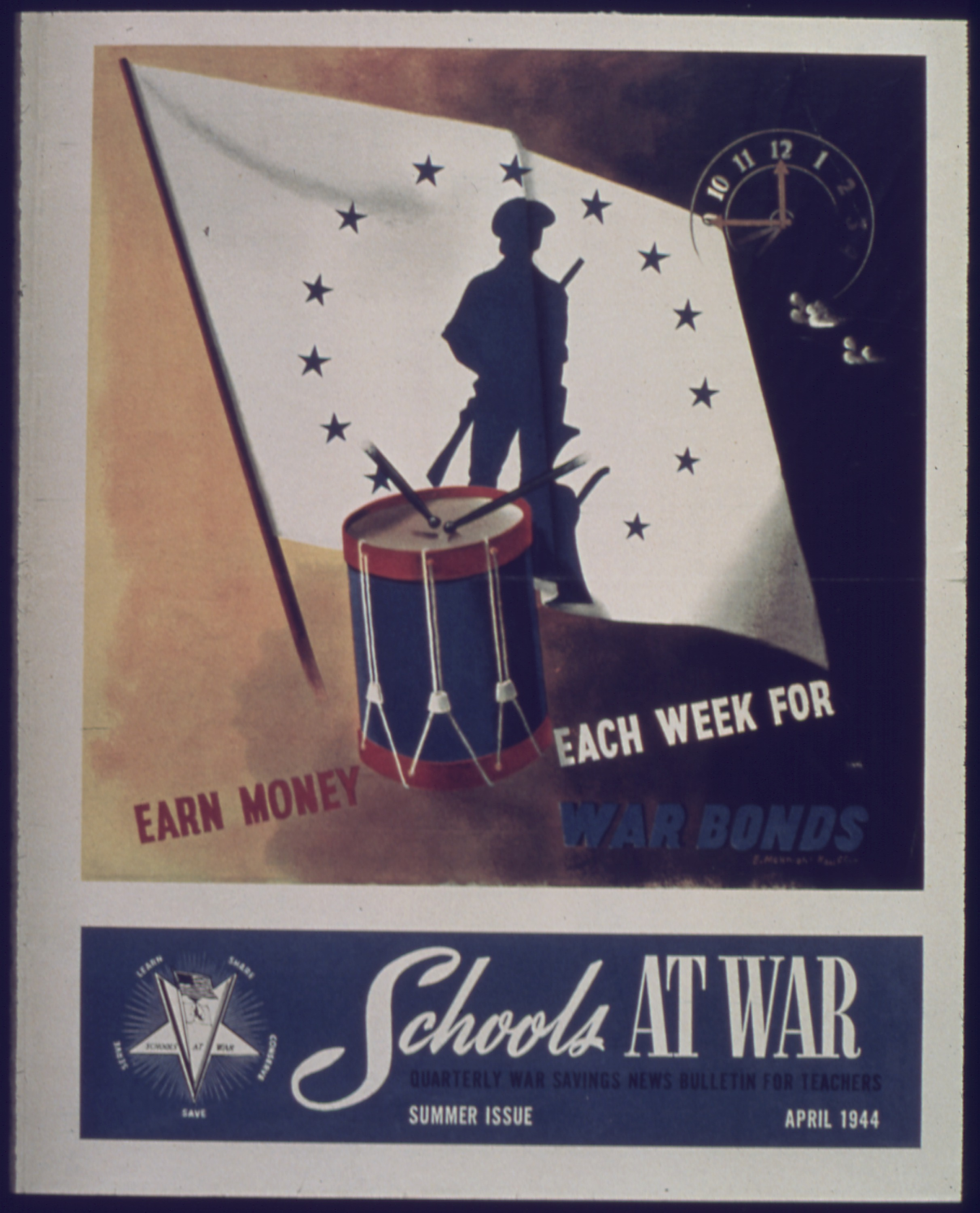
7th Schools At War, April 1944

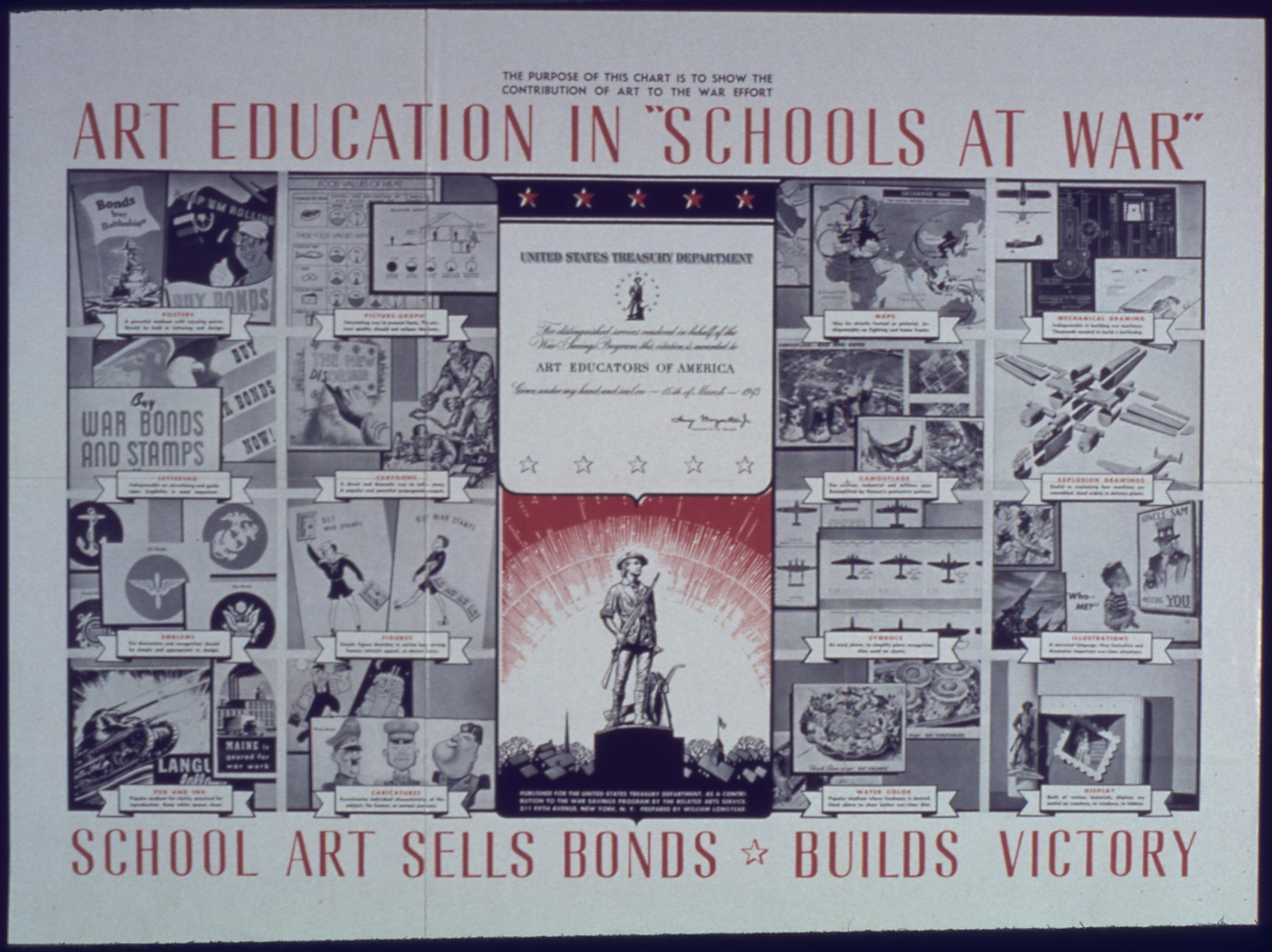
Art education poster

== "Minuteman" flag ==
As another incentive, any school with at least ninety percent of its students buying a war stamp every month was entitled to fly a special "Minuteman flag". This flag, announced in January 1943, showed a silhouette of a Minuteman and thirteen blue stars on a field of white, the reverse of the flag the Treasury awarded to businesses with ninety percent of employees purchasing war bonds. A school could fly both flags if both its students and staff met the contribution goals. The idea for this flag originated in the Los Angeles School District, who proposed it to the Treasury. It was accepted and rolled out nationwide. After a school principal certified a school had met the requirement, the school was permitted to fly the flag, available in either 4 ft × 6 ft (1.2 m × 1.8 m) or 3 ft × 5 ft (0.91 m × 1.52 m) (The flag was to be about three quarters the size of the American flag flown by the school). The first raising of the flag at a school was often at an assembly with patriotic music and a summary of the school's accomplishments. Only a few thousand schools earned the right to fly the flag. Principals were expected to take down the flag if participation fell below ninety percent. (Note: Alternatively, schools may have had to return the flag to the Treasury.) If meeting the 90 percent purchase goal for an entire semester, the school was allowed to add an additional star. Near the end of the program, a special insignia reading "Schools-at-War, 1941–1946" was designed for schools that had maintained their status.

Every one of the 37 schools in Lamar County, Alabama, including all white and all Negro schools, qualified for the flag in spring 1945; Lamar was the only county in the state to achieve that. The schools of Indianapolis, Indiana, were the first major American city in which all of its schools qualified for the flag. A ceremony was held at the Indiana World War Memorial, filmed to be shown in movie newsreels, in which students from the ninety schools displayed the flags in a giant "V" pattern.

== Campaigns or promotions ==
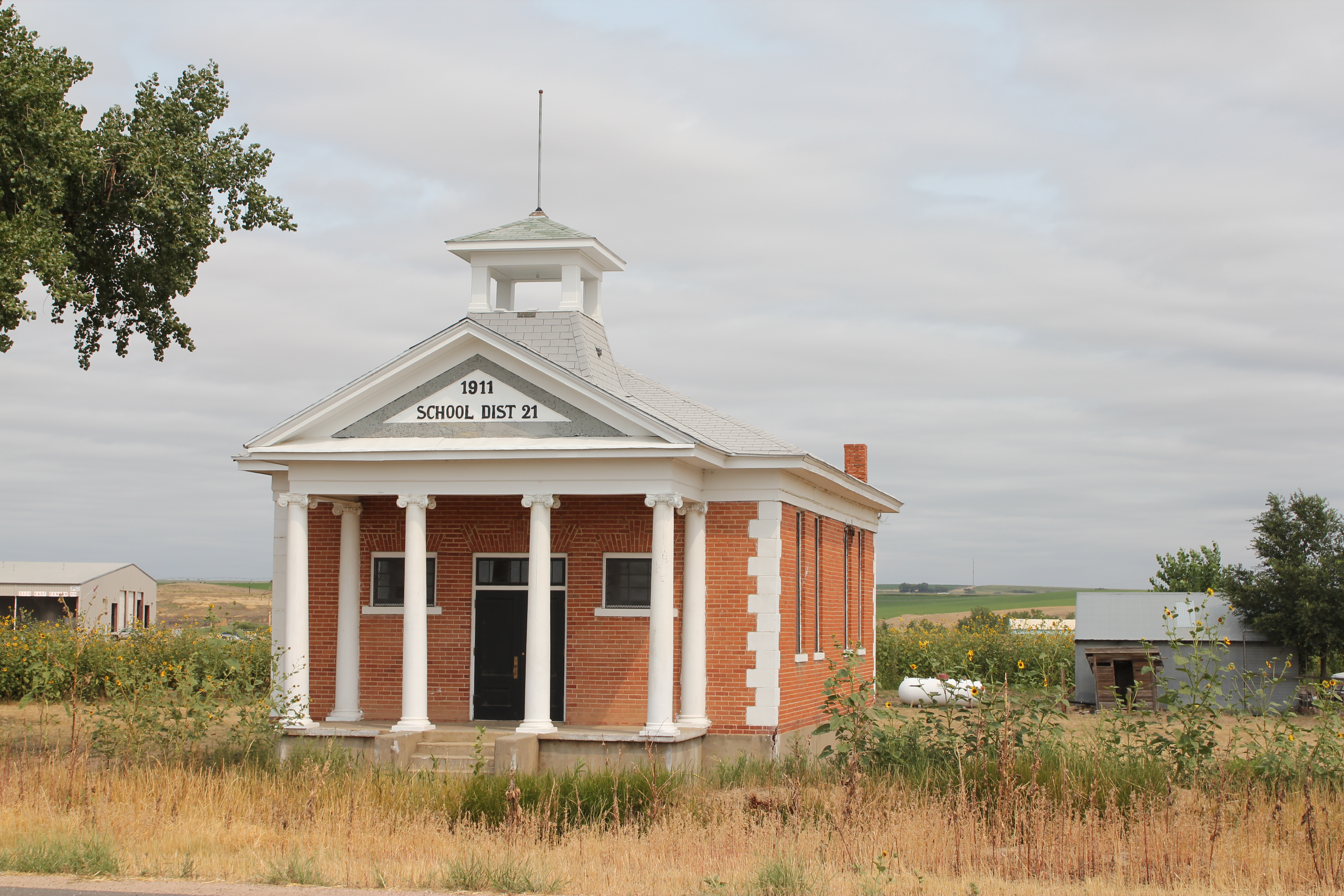
Students of the Daniels School in Colorado set a goal to raise $900 for a jeep by stamps and bonds sales, opened a Junior Red Cross unit, and "completed a scrapbook, which they submitted to the Treasury Department, for publicizing ideas helpful to furthering the war effort."

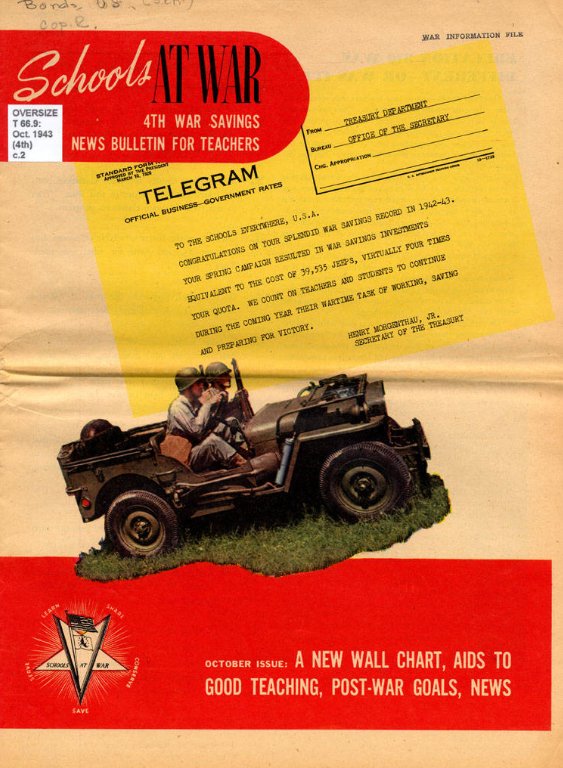
4th Schools at War news bulletin front cover, October 1943, showing results of first Jeep Campaign

To encourage the purchase of stamps by students, schools set goals for specific military equipment. The most notable was a "Jeep" promotion of 1943. With a goal of 10,000 jeeps, over 39,535 jeeps were sponsored by the close of the 1943 school year in early summer (one third of the entire amount delivered to the military), as were around 100 airplanes. The 39,535th jeep was accepted by the Army General Brehon B. Somervell, who headed the Army Service Forces, at a special ceremony on the steps of The Pentagon in June 1943. Students from two local schools represented the nation's students.

In the fall semester of the 1943–1944 school year, the Treasury set a goal for another 20,000 jeeps. As schoolchildren found the jeep particularly appealing, the fall campaign was expanded to include "Flying Jeeps", a Piper Cub L-4, at a cost of $3,000 and an amphibious version for $2,000. A standard jeep cost $1,165. The program had a goal of 20,000 jeeps of all kinds by December 7, 1943. The actual number financed in this period was 50,000.

Posters were made available explaining the cost of the various "jeeps". Patriotic songs accompanied the promotion, such as:

Buy Jeeps, buy Jeeps
Send thousands of Jeeps o'er the sea, the sea
Buy Jeeps, buy Jeeps
And bring back my loved one to me.

Although school children were especially motivated by the jeep, campaigns were nevertheless extended to airplanes, including Fairchild bomber crew trainers and the Flying Fortress, and nearer the end of the war, hospital and rehabilitation equipment. In 1944, schoolchildren sponsored 2,900 planes and 11,690 parachutes.

Decals or labels with the school name could be placed on the equipment to indicate that a particular school had paid for it to increase student interest in sponsoring equipment. The metal label panel on a jeep cost an additional $6.75, which many schools declined, receiving only a citation of the sponsorship. In some cases, jeeps were sent to the school on promotional tours before going to war, although this only happened with special arrangements. Many schools later received letters of appreciation from the soldiers who had used the equipment. A typical jeep dashboard plaque read:

This jeep is one of a fleet presented to the United States Army by the students and faculty of Stockton High School, Stockton, Calif. Notice: Please report periodically the fate of this jeep and return the plaque at the end of the war.

Stockton High School in Stockton, California, had sponsored so many jeeps (275), they reportedly received "thousands" of letters from thankful soldiers "describing their exploits and adventures while riding in Stockton High jeeps". Over two hundred of these letters are preserved at the Haggin Museum in Stockton.

Other equipment for which a school could receive a sponsorship citation included:

- Motor scooter, $185
- Field ambulance, $1,780
- Water tank truck, $2,605
- Light tank, $45,000
- Mobile laundry, $49,500
- Medium tank, $90,000
- Heavy tank, $145,000

For larger sums, a school (or school district) could sponsor a plane to be named for the school:

- Pursuit plane, $75,000
- C-3 ambulance plane, $110,000
- Medium bomber, $175,000
- Heavy bomber, $300,000

The school would receive a photograph of the plane showing the name painted on the nose from the U.S. Signal Corps.

== Program posters ==
Posters were made in support of Schools at War, including many sponsored by Abbott Laboratories. The Chicago pharmaceutical company was a major supplier for the U.S military before and during the war. The company engaged in a philanthropic program to create artwork for the war effort. It used dozens of artists to create hundreds of illustrations. The drawings were published in the company's medical journal What's New and used by the War and Treasury Departments. Artists were paid the salary of active-duty military officers. The U.S. Government Printing Office widely distributed posters of the prints.

The first poster distributed to schools was "contributed" by the Woolworth Co. Fighting Uncle Sam, by artist N. C. Wyeth was shipped to all junior and senior high schools in the fall of 1942. Each school received a 30-by-40-inch (76 cm × 102 cm) poster and 10 in × 13 in (25 cm × 33 cm) copies for every classroom.

Posters produced under the combat art program for Schools at War include:

- "Bonds Build Ships! Buy More Bonds" George Picken, 1945
- "Buy War Bonds", art by Symeon Shimin, c. 1942–1945
- "Carry Your Share – Buy War Bonds", art by Joseph Hirsch, 1943
- "For All the Brave – Buy War Bonds", c. 1939–1946
- "If You Can't Go Across – Come Across! Buy War Bonds", art by Ernest Fiene, 1943
- "Invest in Invasion – Buy War Bonds", art by Harold Lehman, 1943
- "Speed the Day with War Bonds", art by Joseph Hirsch, c. 1939–1946
- "To Keep our Land Secure – Buy War Bonds", art by Leon Kroll, 1945
- "Don't Let That Shadow Touch Them – Buy War Bonds", by Lawrence Beall Smith, 1942

Some posters provided details of the stamps values, such as:

- 11 25-cent stamps would pay for one steel helmet
- 1 10-cent stamp would provide enough oxygen for one bomber pilot
- 2 25-cent stamps would provide the fuel for a destroyer to travel one mile
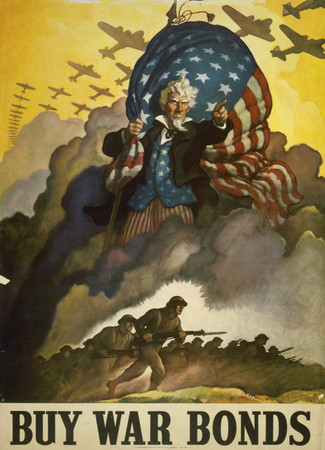
Fighting Uncle Sam, 1942—The first poster, distributed by the program to all junior and senior high schools in the country

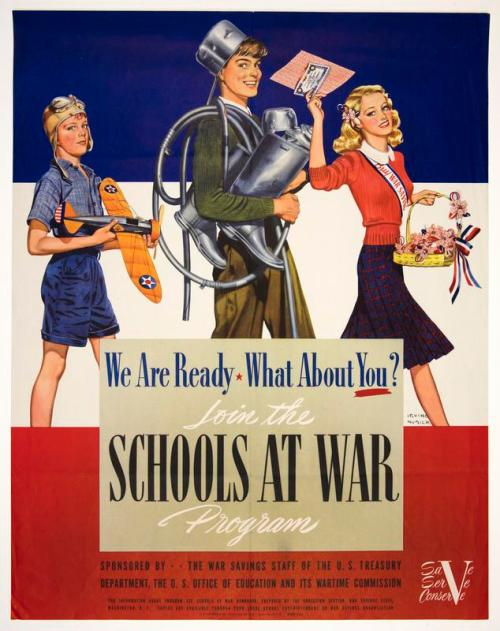
1942 poster encouraging schools to join the program

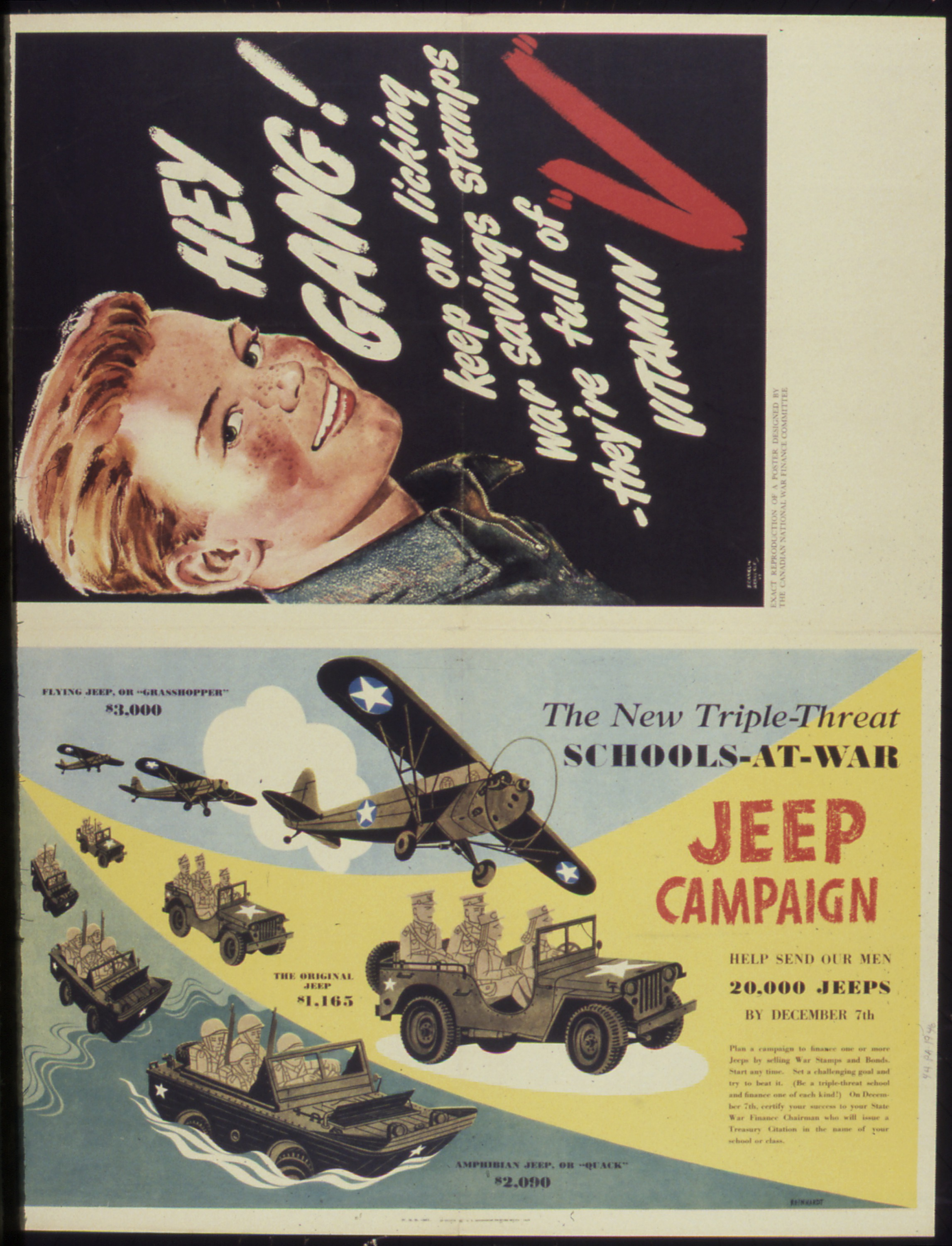
Poster publicizing the fall 1943 "Jeep Campaign"

== Youth organizations, private schools, colleges ==
Although the program predominantly reached its participants through their schools, children continued the program during the summer and after school in other participating youth organizations, including the Boy Scouts, Girl Scouts, Camp Fire Girls, 4-H Clubs, Future Farmers of America.

In addition to public schools, Catholic schools, the largest class of private schools in the U.S., from all 106 archdioceses in the United States, were included in the program.

The Treasury unsuccessfully targeted the program at institutions of higher education as well. Large universities generally did not prioritize participation in the war savings program because of the finite room in collegiate curricula. Small colleges were more likely to participate in the program. Academia was found to be preoccupied with "the intellectual rather than the practical aspects of citizenship" with college professors "less responsive" to the war financing program and college students with "no funds to invest".

== Results ==
From 1942 to 1945, The Treasury Department estimated that 30 million children took part in over 200,000 schools and purchased or sold over $2 billion (equivalent to $36.6 billion in 2025) worth of bonds and stamps. This amounted to an average of $1 per pupil per month.

In September 1945, the program was renamed "Schools for Peace", and two months later, "Schools at Work for Lasting Victory" in November 1945. Money was still needed to fund occupations, humanitarian aid, and the return of the servicemen to the States. The participation rate needed to fly the Minuteman flag was lowered, and stars were added for each year, with a gold star for five years.

=== Examples ===
In Worcester, Massachusetts, over the entire period of March 1942 through 1945, 34,000 students raised $1,632,416 for the purchase of war bonds and stamps.

In Tonganoxie, Kansas, the town's small high school with 130 students sought to raise $175,000 for a B-25 Mitchell medium bomber to be named "Chief Tonga". Starting in September 1943, they hoped to raise the money by December 7. The principal noted that 135 past school graduates were serving in the military. With each student's share amounting to $1,346, most purchases needed to come from soliciting the community. The local paper offer unlimited free space for publicizing the drive. After several months, the students were $2,000 short on the morning of the final day and managed to sell another $5,000 in bonds on their lunch period to meet the goal.

Stockton High School in Stockton, California, participated with exceptional enthusiasm in the jeep campaign, contributing money and selling enough stamps and bonds in the greater Stockton area to sponsor 275 jeeps, at the cost of $225,000 from 1943 to 1945. Most of the jeeps were sent to the Pacific Theater with some going to Europe including Stockton High jeep number 151. While the final disposition of most of the jeeps is unknown, the story of that particular jeep has been documented. It was captured by the Germans in Italy and recaptured a year later by Canadian paratroopers in Holland, who, noting the Stockton tag, returned it to the American military. It was shipped to the Red River Army Depot near Texarkana, Texas for disposal as war surplus and auctioned to a Texas farmer who used it for ten years. Left in a field, it was "discovered" by a "Dallas carbuff", Don Maclellan, in 1963, who kept it until the late 1970s. Despite offers of $5,500 and more, he suspected the jeep had sentimental value in Stockton. A former Stockton High principal publicized the jeep's story in the Stockton Record and two brothers who were both Stockton High war-years graduates and WWII veterans bought No. 151 for $5,500. The jeep was transported back to Stockton at no charge by the Red Ball Motor Freight company, a trucking firm founded by former soldiers of the U.S. Army's famous Red Ball Express truck convoy system. The jeep was donated to the city of Stockton and later went to the Haggin Museum, a local history museum in Stockton, where after several decades, it was restored in 2006.

St. Mary of the Mount High School, a Catholic school in Pittsburgh, Pennsylvania, set a goal to raise the $75,000 cost of a fighter plane to be named after the school. After four weeks, they had raised $82,000, and the students changed the goal to a $175,000 medium bomber. They ended up selling $300,000 in war bonds in six weeks. One fifth-grader sold $15,050 and 35 students were responsible for $165,000.

A school in Barton County, Kansas, with only ten students raised enough to sponsor two jeeps, was one of the first Kansas schools to qualify to fly the Minuteman flag.

The schools in Philadelphia, Pennsylvania raised over $1 million in January 1943, with five individual schools reaching $175,000 to qualify for sponsoring a heavy bomber.

The Territory of Alaska presented Alaska's Liberty brick to the Ketchikan Schools on Pearl Harbor Day, 1943, for having the best performance in the territory in the previous school year. Each of Ketchikan's schools also received a Minuteman flag. The brick, displayed in a glass case, belonged to the Ketchikan Schools permanently. As of 2021, it is in the collection of the Tongass Historical Museum in Ketchikan.

== Analysis ==
The program was so successful for many reasons. It had strong backing by teachers and administrators, who, being well respected, effected further support from the community (which purchased most of the bonds sold by the students). School children influenced their parents through what they learned about saving, conserving, and financing the war. They spread the message throughout communities; Boy Scouts were especially valuable in distributing posters and other promotional materials.

Factors that negatively impacted the program included resistance by some school administrators to any Federal involvement in education, the size of the state and local education bureaucracy, teachers who felt overburdened, and physical complexities related to the thousands of schools that operated without common organization. The bonds sales ratio to the program costs were lower than other programs like payroll savings.

== See also ==
- High School Victory Corps, a program for older students
- United States home front during World War II
