= Byrd Baylor =

American children's book author (1924–2021)

- Born: March 28, 1924; San Antonio, Texas, U.S.
- Died: June 16, 2021 (aged 97); Tucson, Arizona, U.S.
- Occupation: Author
- Writing career
- Genre: Children's literature
- Notable works: Amigo, When Clay Sings, The Desert is Theirs, Hawk, I'm Your Brother, The Way to Start a Day

Byrd Baylor (March 28, 1924 – June 16, 2021) was an American novelist, essayist, and author of picture books for children. Four of her books have achieved Caldecott Honor status.

== Background ==
Byrd Baylor was born in March 1924 in San Antonio, Texas. She was related to Robert Emmett Bledsoe Baylor, the namesake of Baylor University, and to Admiral Richard E. Byrd. Her first name, Byrd, is taken from her mother's maiden name.

Baylor attended the University of Arizona.

== Writing ==
Baylor's work presents images of the Southwest and an intense connection between the land and the Native American people. Her prose illustrates vividly the value of simplicity, the natural world, and the balance of life within it. She wrote an essay entitled "Good Women Who Love Bad Trucks" which she read aloud for radio station KXCI. Byrd contributed essays to Tucson's City Magazine in the late 1980s.

== Personal life ==
Baylor latterly lived in Arivaca, Arizona, in an adobe house that did not have electricity. She worked with three manual typewriters.

She died in June 2021 at the age of 97 in Tucson, Arizona.

== Caldecott Honors ==
Baylor was awarded Caldecott Honors for her books When Clay Sings (1973) with illustrator Tom Bahti, and The Desert is Theirs (1976), Hawk, I'm Your Brother (1977), and The Way to Start a Day (1979) with illustrator Peter Parnall.

== Bibliography ==
- Amigo (1963, illustrated by Garth Williams))
- One Small Blue Bead (1965; illustrated by Symeon Shimin)
- Before You Came This Way (1969, illustrated by Tom Bahti)
- Coyote Cry (1972, drawings by Symeon Shimin)
- When Clay Sings (1972, illustrated by Tom Bahti)
- Sometimes I Dance Mountains (1973, photographs by Bill Sears, drawings by Ken Longtemps)
- Everybody Needs a Rock (1974; illustrated by Peter Parnall)
- The Desert is Theirs (1975; illustrated by Peter Parnall) (Caldecott Honor)
- Hawk, I’m Your Brother (1976; illustrated by Peter Parnall) (Caldecott Honor)
- Guess Who My Favorite Person Is (1977; illustrated by Robert Andrew Parker)
- Yes Is Better than No (1977; with illustrations by Leonard Chana, 1990)
- The Way to Start a Day (1978; illustrated by Peter Parnall) (Caldecott Honor)
- The Other Way to Listen (1978; illustrated by Peter Parnall)
- Your Own Best Secret Place (1979; illustrated by Peter Parnall)
- If You Are a Hunter of Fossils (1980; illustrated by Peter Parnall)
- Desert Voices (1981; illustrated by Peter Parnall)
- I'm In Charge of Celebrations (1986; illustrated by Peter Parnall)
- The Table Where Rich People Sit (1994; illustrated by Peter Parnall)
