= Daniels School =

- U.S. National Register of Historic Places
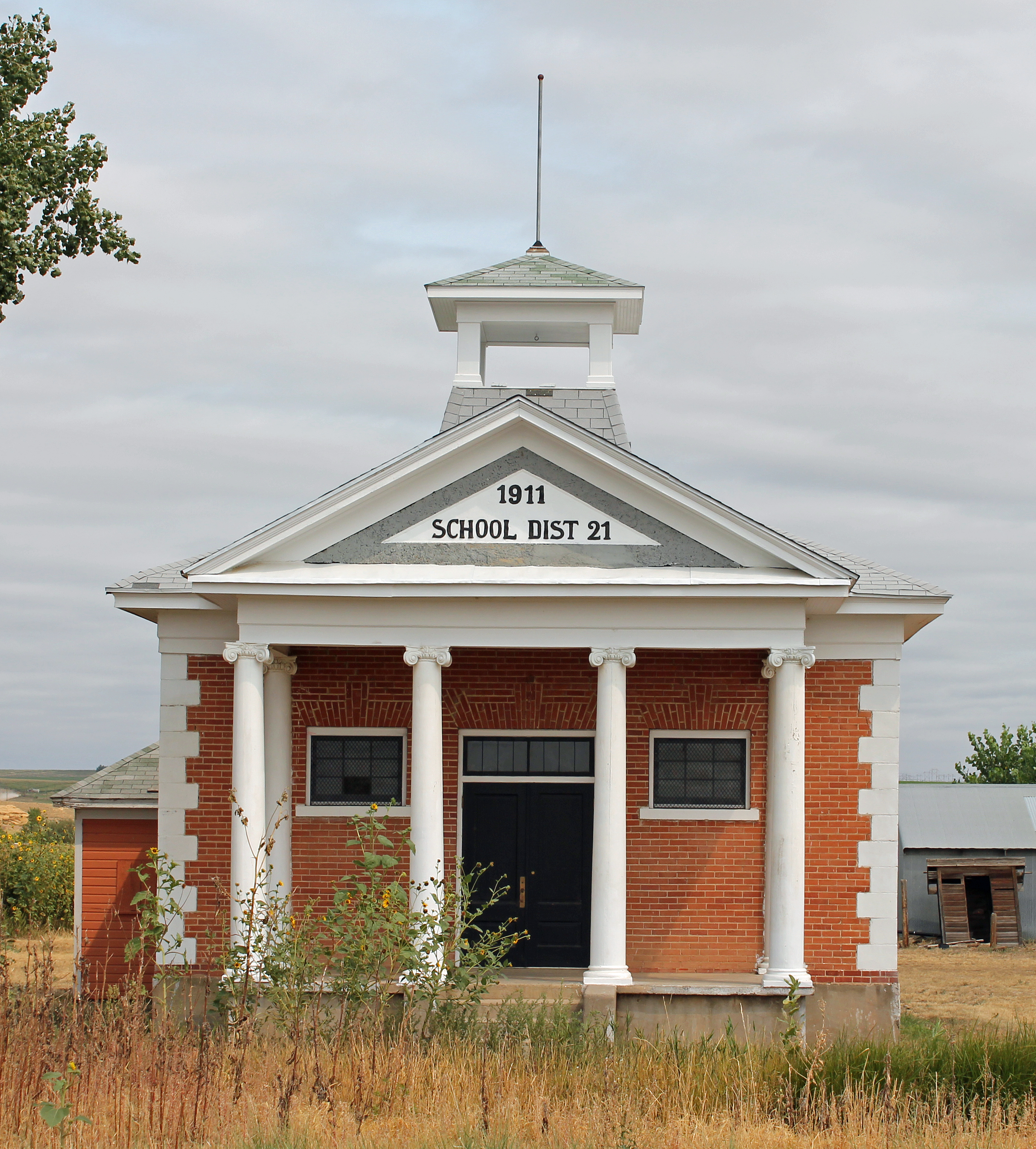
- School in 2012

- Location within Colorado Location within the United States
- Location: Colorado State Highway 60 near its intersection with Weld County Rd. 25, in or near Milliken, Colorado
- Coordinates: 40.33050°N 104.82490°W
- Area: less than one acre
- Built: 1911
- Built by: C.J. Mathers; H.W. Richmond
- Architectural style: Classical Revival
- NRHP reference No.: 05000653
- Added to NRHP: July 6, 2005

The Daniels School, in Milliken in Weld County, Colorado, was built in 1911. It is a two-room schoolhouse, with a partition that allowed separation of grades 1–4 vs. grades 5–8, which operated from 1911 to 1959. It was listed on the National Register of Historic Places in 2005.

It was built on a one-acre (0.40 ha) plot of land donated to the school district by James Daniels in 1879. A wood-frame schoolhouse was built first; it was sold and moved off the property to enable replacement by the present brick building in 1911. James Daniels served as director of the school for many years. The school was named, however, for his brother, Henry Daniels, who was a pioneer in the Big Thompson Valley area before Johnstown and Milliken existed.

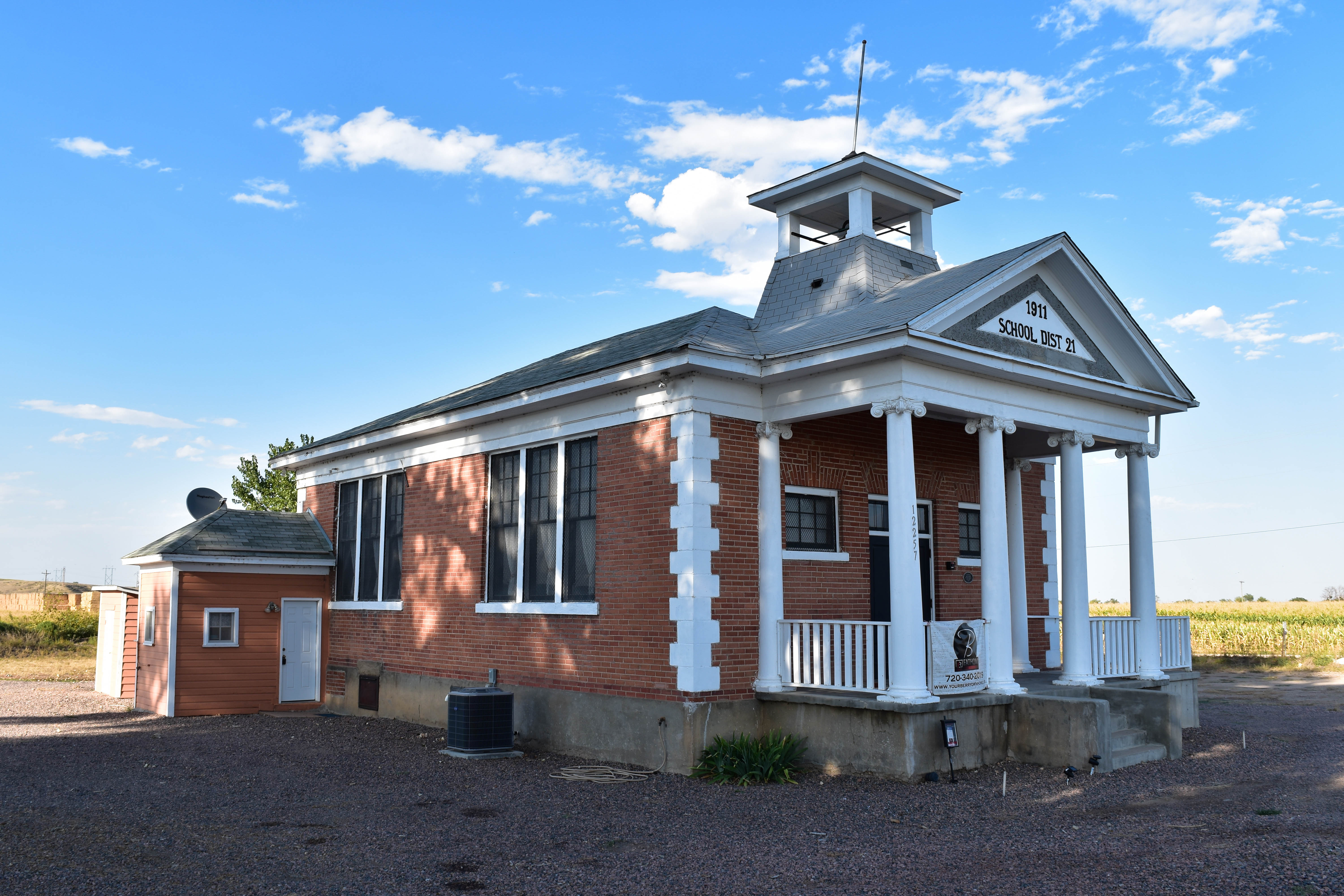
School in 2018.

It is Classical Revival in style, built of brick, and has a pedimented porch spanning the front, with four Tuscan columns. It is about 30 by 57 feet (9.1 m × 17.4 m) in plan, including the porch. The school was built in 1911 by carpenters H.W. Richmond and C.J. Mathers, who weren't able to complete it until after the fall school term had started.

During World War II, the school was used for ration book distribution, and students set a goal for selling stamps and bonds to raise $900 to fund a jeep, as part of the U.S. Treasury Schools at War program. During and after the years of its operation as a school, it was used for Boy Scout meetings and other community purposes.

The school closed in 1959. Per terms that ownership would revert to the original owner or descendant, Harold Daniels, a grandson of Henry Daniels, became property owner. Harold had attended grades one through eight at the Daniels School, during 1933 to 1940. Until the mid-1970s it was still used for Boy Scouts, and has since been used for storage.

The listing included two other contributing buildings: a wood-frame teacherage and a privy, and it included a metal swingset frame built at time of the school's construction, in 1911. The privy is a wood-frame two-seat structure which was built by the Works Progress Administration in the 1930s, and replaced two original brick privies.

The school is located on Colorado State Highway 60 (Note: The NRHP nomination mis-identifies the highway as U.S. Highway 60, a highway which does not enter Colorado.) near its intersection with Weld County Road 25. (Note: It is located just outside of the border of the statutory town of Milliken, according to what can be seen in Google maps.)
