= Peter Parnall =

American artist and writer (1936–2017)

- Born: Peter Kommer Parnall; May 23, 1936; Syracuse, New York, U.S.
- Died: September 8, 2017 (aged 81); Lincoln, Maine, U.S.
- Occupations: Illustrator, writer
- Spouse: Virginia Shepard
- Children: Bart; Stacy
- Writing career
- Subjects: Animals, nature
- Notable works: Desert Solitaire; The Great Fish; The Desert Is Theirs; Hawk, I'm Your Brother; The Way to Start a Day

Peter Kommer Parnall (May 23, 1936 – September 8, 2017) was an American artist and writer, best known for his work on books for younger readers. His work earned him high praise and a number of awards. Some of his books have become collector items.

== Biography ==
Peter Parnall was born in Syracuse, New York on May 23, 1936. He was raised in the small town of Willow Springs in the Mojave Desert. He went to Cornell in 1954 because he wanted to become a veterinarian, but got pneumonia and failed his freshman mid-terms. After leaving Cornell he went west to train horses. When his father's birthday came around he drew him a picture of a horse. His father hung it on the wall and told him he should go back to school for art. He attended the Pratt Institute for two years, until he got bored and left. For ten years he had a freelance advertising business (with clients including Mr. Potato Head and G.I. Joe), which he enjoyed but eventually "got tired of convincing people they should buy stuff they don't need." Once he decided on a career in illustrating books, he moved with his wife and son to Milford, New Jersey, where he started a farm in Alfalfa Hill (which he would eventually depict in his self-authored 1975 book Alfalfa Hill) while also teaching art and design at Lafayette College.

Parnall died on September 8, 2017, at the age of 81.

== Works ==
Parnall illustrated over 80 books, including nearly 20 which he authored himself, often studies of habitats. His favorite medium was pen and ink of subjects from the natural world. Many of his works have been separately published in limited editions as signed and numbered prints.

As Author and Illustrator

- 1971: The Mountain (Doubleday)
- 1973: The Great Fish (Doubleday)
- 1975: Alfalfa Hill (Doubleday)
- 1977: A Dog's Book of Birds (Scribner)
- 1984: Daywatchers (Macmillan)
- 1986: Winter Barn (Macmillan)
- 1987: Apple Tree (Macmillan)
- 1988: Feet! (Macmillan)
- 1989: Quiet (Morrow)
- 1989: Cats from Away (Macmillan)
- 1990: Woodpile (Macmillan)
- 1991: The Rock (Macmillan)
- 1991: Marsh Cat (novel) (Macmillan)
- 1992: Stuffer (Macmillan)
- 1993: Spaces (Millbrook)
- 1993: Water Pup (novel) (Macmillan)
- 1995: Pa Bon (Prentice Hall & IBD)
- 1995: Pine Tree (Prentice Hall & IBD)

As illustrator

- 1960: A Picture Book of Interesting Words, written by Judith Klugman (Hart)
- 1962: Beyond Your Doorstep: A Handbook to the Country, written by Hal Borland (Knopf)
- 1964: The Cheechakoes, written by Wayne Short (Random House)
- 1965: Of House and Cats, written by Eunice De Chazeau (Random House)
- 1966: A Tale of Middle Length, written by Mary Francis Shura (Atheneum)
- 1967: A Dog's Book of Bugs, written by Elizabeth Griffen (Atheneum)
- 1967: One Hundred Great Guns: An Illustrated History of Firearms, written by Merrill Lindsay (Walker & Co.)
- 1967: Farewell to Texas: A Vanishing Wilderness, written by William O. Douglas (McGraw-Hill)
- 1967: Knee-Deep in Thunder, written by Sheila Moon (Atheneum)
- 1967: The Psychology of Birds: An Interpretation of Bird Behavior, written by Harold Ernest Burtt (Macmillan)
- 1968: The Underground Hideaway, written by Murray Goodwin (Harper & Row)
- 1968: The Little Italian Cookbook, written by Christiana Lindsay and Alfred Lepore (Walker & Co.)
- 1968: Desert Solitaire, written by Edward Abbey (McGraw-Hill) (subsequent editions illus. by Lawrence Ormsby)
- 1968: The Heritage, written by Francis Parkinson Keyes (McGraw-Hill) (dust jacket only)
- 1968: Kävik the Wolf Dog, written by Walt Morey (Dutton)
- 1968: Malachi Mudge, written by Cecil Maiden (McGraw-Hill)
- 1968: The Moon of the Wild Pigs, written by Jean Craighead George (Crowell)
- 1968: Tall Tales of the Catskills, written by Frank L. DuMond (Atheneum)
- 1969: A Beastly Circus, written by Peggy Parish (Simon & Schuster)
- 1969: Apricot ABC, written by Miska Miles (Little, Brown)
- 1969: The Gruesome Green Witch, written by Patricia Coffin (Walker & Co.)
- 1970: The Inspector, written by George Mendoza (Doubleday & Co.)
- 1970: But Ostriches, written by Aileen Fisher (Crowell)
- 1970: Doctor Rabbit, written by Jan Wahl (Delacorte)
- 1971: A Squirrel of One's Own, written by Douglas Fairbairn (McCall) (dust jacket only)
- 1971: Big Frog, Little Pond, written by George Mendoza (McCall)
- 1971: Annie and The Old One, written by Miska Miles (Little, Brown)
- 1971: Moonfish and Owl Scratchings, written by George Mendoza (Scribner)
- 1971: The Nightwatchers, written by Angus Cameron (Four Winds Press)
- 1971: The Six Voyages of Pleasant Fieldmouse, written by Jan Wahl (Delacorte)
- 1971: When the Porcupine Moved In, written by Cora Annett (Franklin Watts)
- 1972: The Fire Bringer: A Paiute Indian Legend, written by Margaret Hodges (Little, Brown)
- 1972: The Fireside Song Book of Birds and Beasts, written by Jane Yolen (Simon & Schuster)
- 1972: Gifts of an Eagle, written by Kent Durden (Simon & Schuster)
- 1973: A Little Book of Little Beasts, written by Mary Ann Hoberman (Simon & Schuster)
- 1973: The Rabbit's World, written by Miriam Schlein (Four Winds Press)
- 1973: Seven Houses: A Memoir of Time and Places, written by Josephine Johnson (Simon & Schuster)
- 1973: Emma's Search for Something, written by Mary Anderson (Atheneum)
- 1973: Twist, Wiggle, and Squirm: A Book about Earthworms, written by Laurence Pringle (Thomas Y. Crowell Company)
- 1974: In the Shadow of a Rainbow, written by Robert Franklin Leslie (Norton) (dust jacket only)
- 1974: Everybody Needs A Rock, written by Byrd Baylor (Scribner) (Note: This was included as a promotional book in Cheerios boxes in 2007.)
- 1974: Tales of Myrtle the Turtle, written by Keith Robertson (The Viking Press)
- 1974: Year on Muskrat Marsh, written by Berniece Freschet (Scribner)
- 1975: The Mothman Prophecies, written by John A. Keel (Saturday Review Press)
- 1975: The Peregrine Falcons, written by Alice Schick (Dial Press)
- 1975: The Pig with One Nostril, written by Millard Lampell (Doubleday)
- 1975: The Twilight Seas: A Blue Whale's Journey, written by Sally Carrighar (Weybright and Talley)
- 1976: The Desert is Theirs, written by Byrd Baylor (Scribner) (Caldecott Honor)
- 1976: A Natural History of Marine Mammals, written by Victor Blanchard Scheffer (Scribner)
- 1977: Hawk, I'm Your Brother, written by Byrd Baylor (Scribner) (Caldecott Honor)
- 1978: The Other Way to Listen, written by Byrd Baylor (Scribner)
- 1978: The Way to Start a Day, written by Byrd Baylor (Scribner) (Caldecott Honor)
- 1978: Little Wild Chimpanzee (co-illustrated with his wife Virginia Parnall), written by Anna Michel (Knopf)
- 1979: Little Wild Elephant (co-illustrated with his wife Virginia Parnall), written by Anna Michel (Knopf)
- 1979: The Spawning Run, written by William Humphrey (Delacorte)
- 1979: Your Own Best Secret Place, written by Byrd Baylor (Atheneum)
- 1980: If You Are a Hunter of Fossils, written by Byrd Baylor (Scribner)
- 1980: Roadrunner (co-illustrated with his wife Virginia Parnall), written by Naomi John (Dutton)
- 1981: Desert Voices, written by Byrd Baylor (Scribner)
- 1985: Between Cattails, written by Terry Tempest Williams (Atheneum)
- 1986: I'm In Charge of Celebrations, written by Byrd Baylor (Scribner)
- 1986: Cat Will Rhyme with Hat, written by Jean Chapman (Scribner)
- 1992: Become a Bird and Fly!, written by Michael E. Ross (Millbrook)
- 1994: The Table Where Rich People Sit, written by Byrd Baylor (Scribner)
