= Symeon Shimin =

Russian born American artist and illustrator

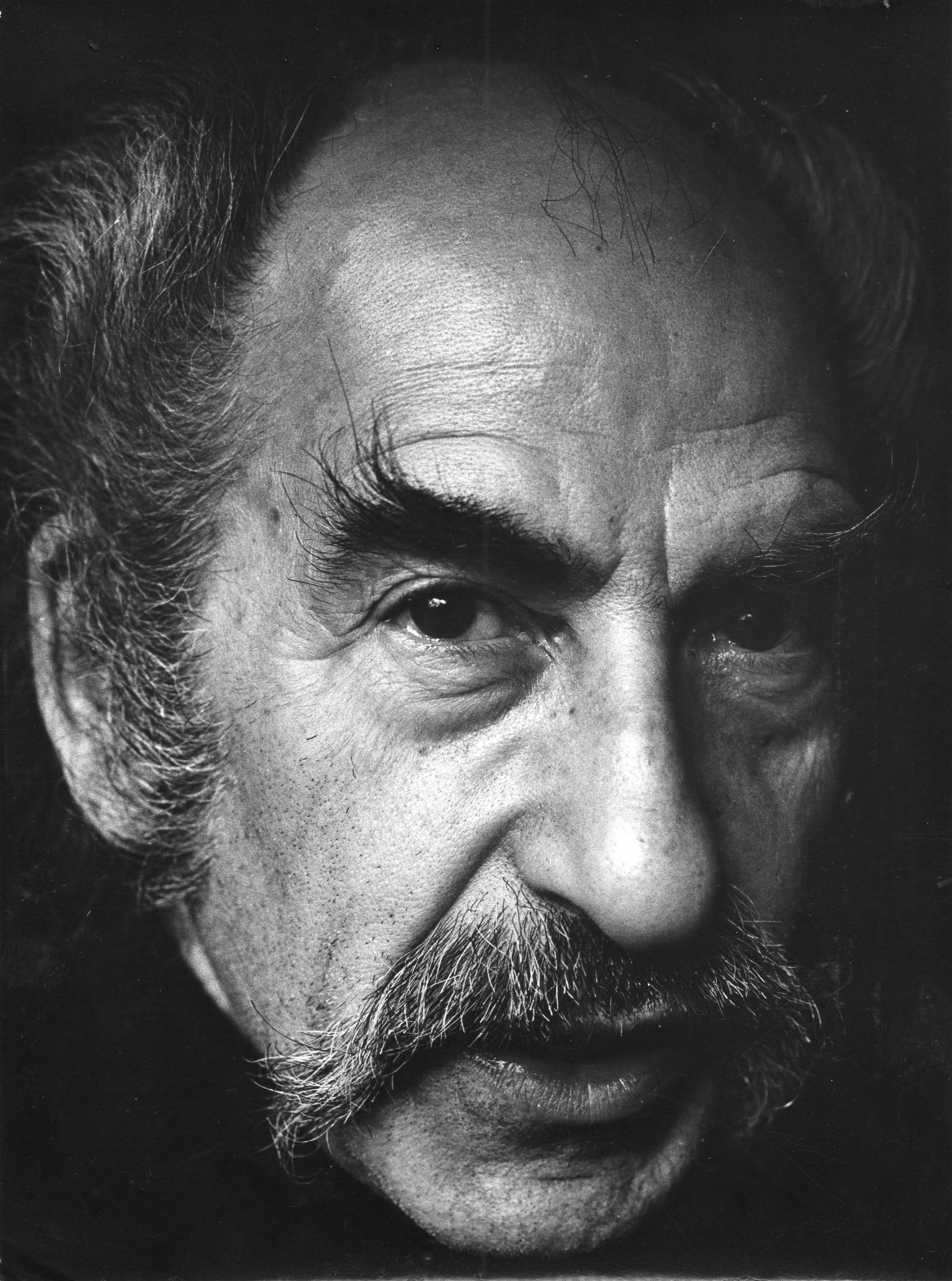
- Symeon Shimin
- Born: 1902; Astrakhan, Russia
- Died: 1984 (aged 81–82); New York City
- Known for: Painting
- Notable work: Contemporary Justice and The Child, The Pack
- Website: https://www.symeonshimin.com

Symeon Shimin (1902 in Astrakhan, Russia-1984 in New York City) was a Russian born American artist and illustrator of Russian Jewish descent. He was principally known as an artist of Hollywood Film Posters and as an award-winning illustrator of 57 children's books including two that he authored himself, I wish there were two of me and A special birthday. His fine art, developed throughout his life, includes the highly acclaimed mural Contemporary Justice and The Child created in 1936, that took four years to complete. Other notable work includes the painting The Pack that he completed in 1959.

== Life ==
Shimin was born in Astrakhan, Russia, on the Caspian Sea, in 1902. In 1912 his Jewish family immigrated to the United States, settling in Brooklyn, N.Y. They opened a delicatessen and lived in two small rooms behind their shop.

In 1918, at 16 years old, Shimin apprenticed himself to a commercial artist to help support his family. He attended art classes at Cooper Union School of Art at night and spent a brief period at the studio of George Luks.

== Early career 1919–1936 ==
In his early career, Shimin worked as a freelance commercial artist. In 1929 he illustrated the January cover of Vanity Fair Magazine, among others. In 1929 he embarked on a trip of 1 1/2 years to Spain and France, where he studied the works of the master artists.

Shimin became a highly sought after artist painting large-scale murals for Hollywood films, creating the original poster for Gone with the Wind in 1939. In other peripheral connections to the cinema world, he also worked on drawings and paintings for the promotional campaign of the 1960s The Magnificent Seven and had a brief stint in the early 1940s as Howard Hughes’ personal artist.

== Mid career and maturity 1936–1972 ==
In 1936, Shimin was awarded a contract by the PWAP, Public Works of Art Project, to paint the mural Contemporary Justice and the Child for the Department of Justice Building, Washington, DC

== Illustrator of children’s books ==
Shimin’s work in children's books began in 1950 when friends Hermann and Nina Schneider asked him to illustrate a revised edition of their How Big is Big?. He discovered that he could channel some of his feeling for the heightened state of imagination in childhood into his work. Shimin subsequently illustrated 57 books for children over three decades, including two that he also authored. I Wish There Were Two Of Me and Special Birthday. In 1974 Shimin was awarded a pair of prestigious Christopher Awards for Gorilla, Gorilla, and A New Baby A New Life, given to artists and producers whose works "affirm the highest values of the human spirit.

Shimin was twice invited to speak at Appalachian University, which later became the site of the Symeon Shimin Papers, de Grummond Children's Literature Collection at The University of Southern Mississippi.

== Italian period ==
In 1956, following many years of intense work on film posters and children’s books, Shimin spent six months in Italy In 1959 his painting, Discussion Groups – Rome, won second prize in the Provincetown Art Competition and is presently in the collection of the Chrysler Museum of Art in Norfolk, Virginia. Time Magazine dubbed Symeon Shimin, a “social realist painter”.

One of the boldest artworks of Shimin’s oeuvre is his masterful large-scale painting titled The Pack, which was exhibited at the Whitney Museum of American Art —Annual Exhibition of American Art in 1959.

In 1959 he also painted the 40 ft. canvas for the Hollywood film Solomon and Sheba for Metro-Goldwyn-Mayer.

== Awards and citations ==
- Citation for War Bonds poster, United States Treasury Department, 1943
- Certificate of Merit 43rd Annual Exhibit of Advertising and Editorial Art and Design, The Art Directors Club of New York, ca. 1943
- Certificate of Merit Society of Illustrators Annual National Exhibit, 1964
- Literary and Artistic Excellence in the Creation of Books for Children citation for Santiago, The Brooklyn Art Books for Children, ca. 1970
- Certificate of Award Graphic Arts Award Competition for Send Wendell illustrations, 1974. Christopher Awards for Gorilla, Gorilla and A New Baby A New Life, 1974.

== Exhibitions ==
- Museum of Modern Art (MoMA), New York, ca. 1938 National Gallery, Washington, DC, ca. 1938
- Whitney Museum of Art Annual, New York, 1940 and 1941
- The Corcoran Gallery, Washington, DC
- Art Institute, Chicago, Chicago, Illinois
- Brooklyn Museum, Brooklyn, New York
- National Gallery, Ottawa, Canada
- The Brill Gallery, Cleveland, Ohio
- Provincetown Art Gallery, Massachusetts, ca. 1958
- Whitney Museum Annual Exhibition of American Art, New York 1959
- Drawings on Canvas One-Man Show, Sidney Frane Gallery, New York, 1961
- Appalachian Cultural Museum, Boone, North Carolina

== Collections ==
- Contemporary Justice and the Child, Department of Justice Building, Washington, DC
- Collection of Fairleigh Dickinson University, Rutherford, New Jersey
- The Symeon Shimin Papers-de Grummond Children's Literature Collection at The University of Southern Mississippi
- The Betsy Beinecke Shirley collection of American children's literature at Yale University
- Smithsonian American Art Museum

== Gallery ==
Shimin Family, Astrakhan Russia 1911

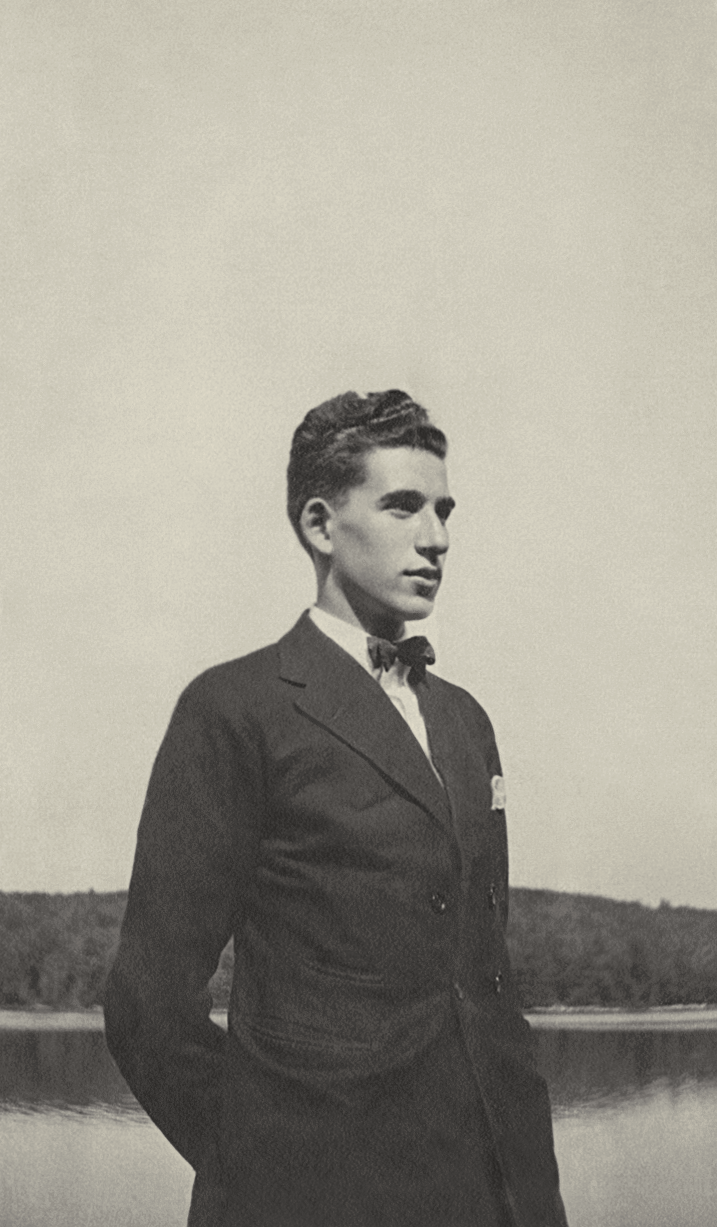
Shimin as a young man, 1920's CA

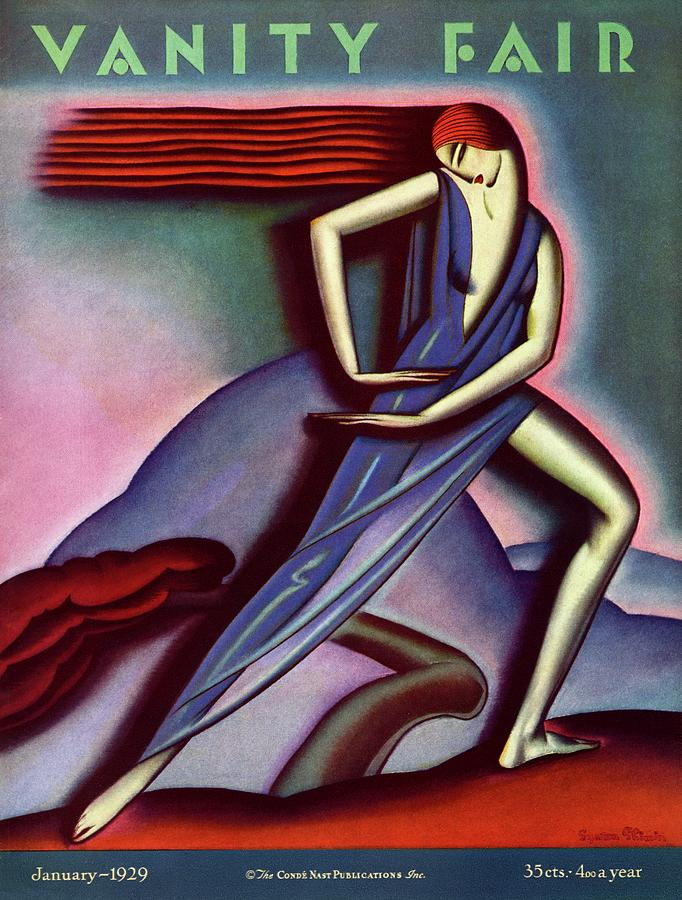
Vanity Fair Cover, 1929

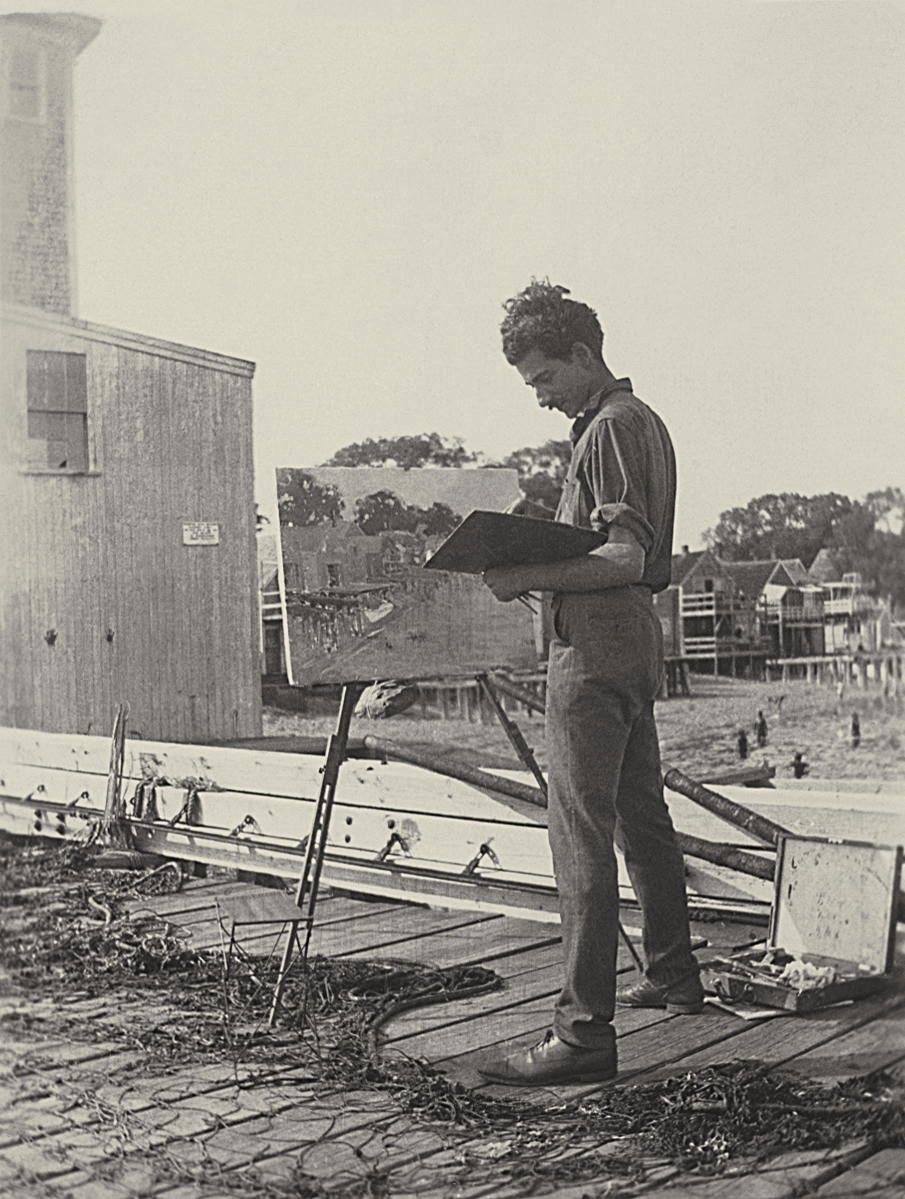
Symeon Shimin, CA 1920's

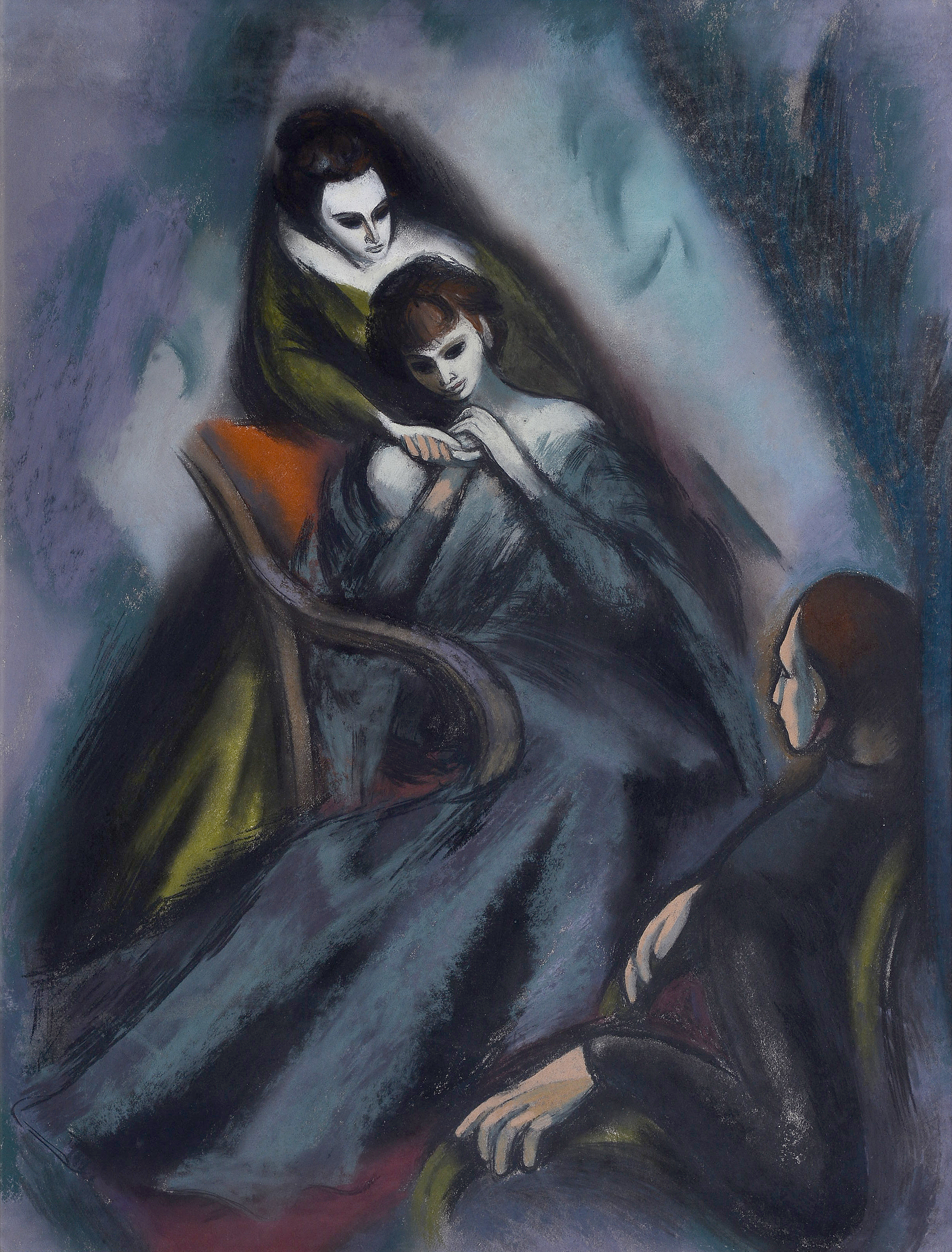
Three Women, cir 1929

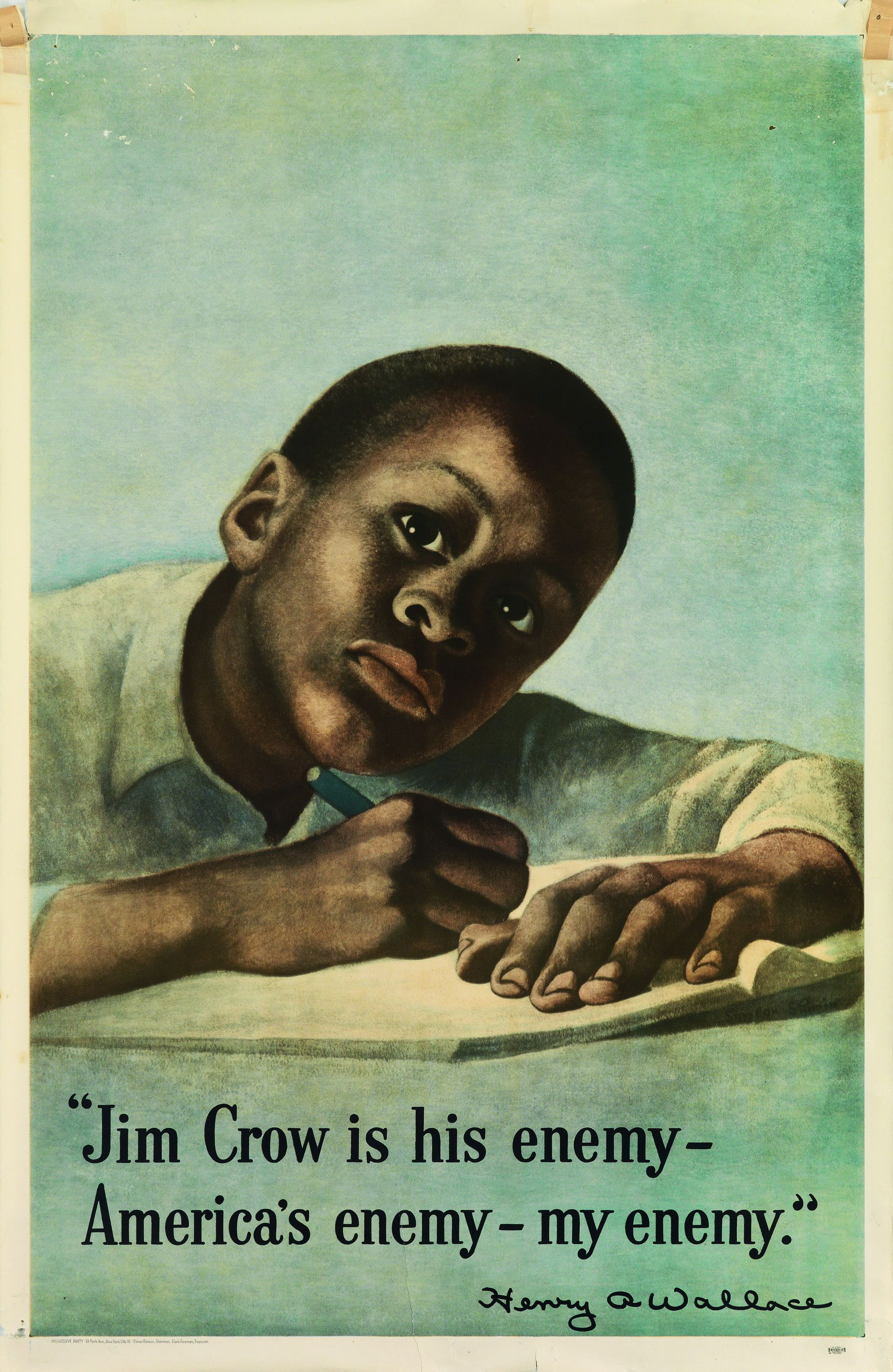
Jim Crow Poster

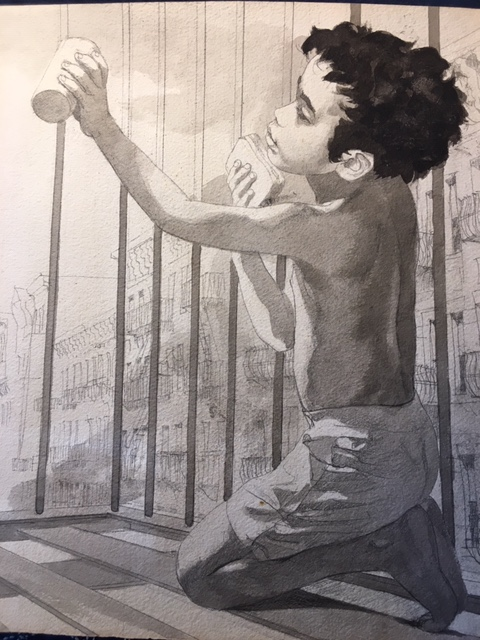
Boy on a Fire Escape

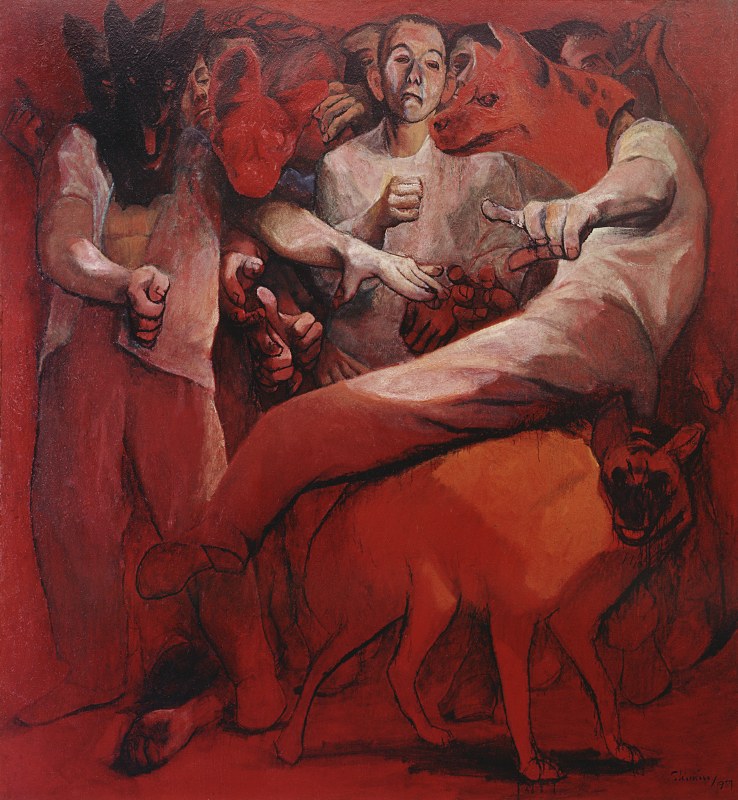
The Pack created in 1959, Inspired by an incident in which he was beaten up in the street.

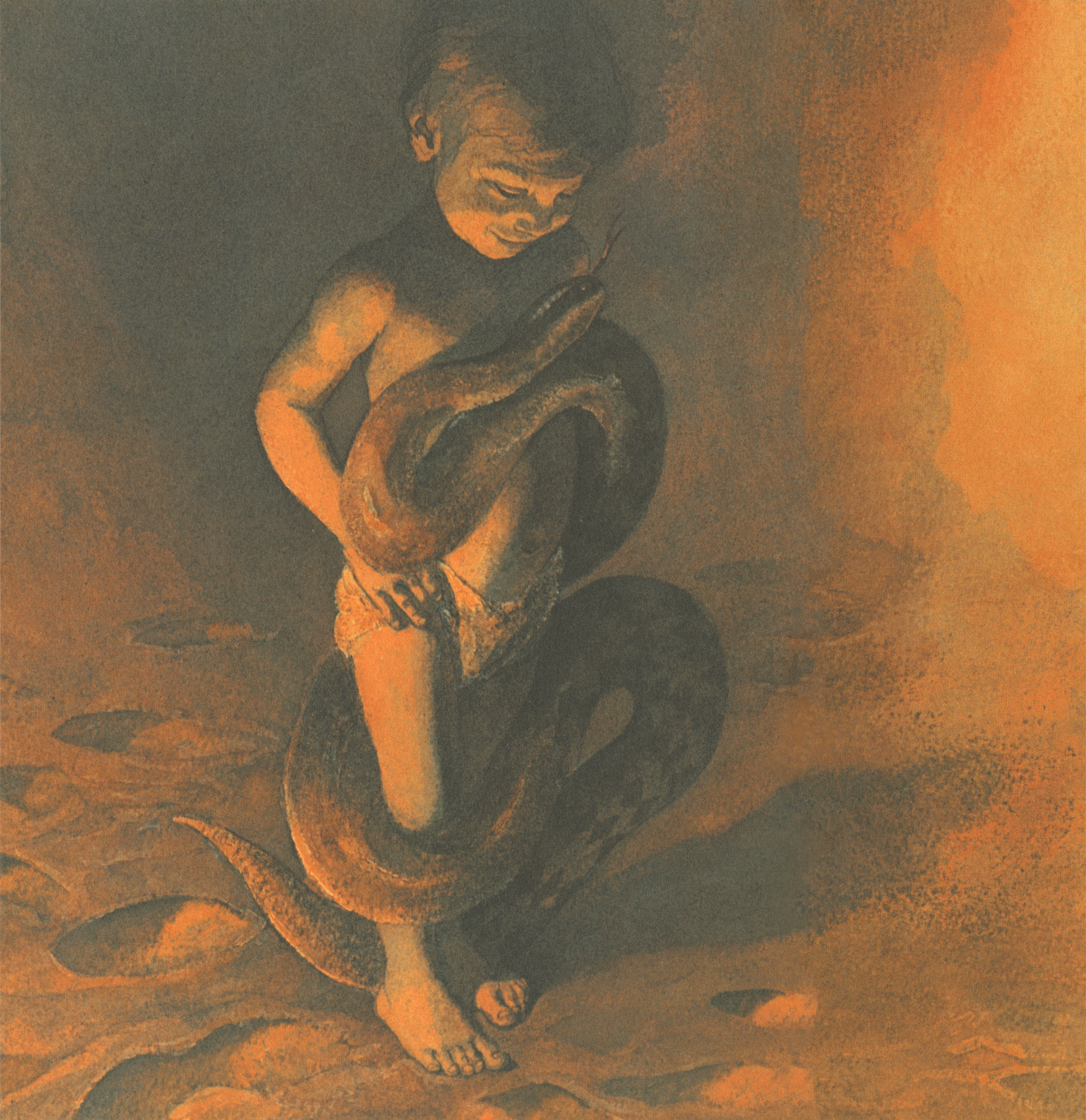
Illustration for Dance in the Desert by Madeleine L'Engle. Created in 1969

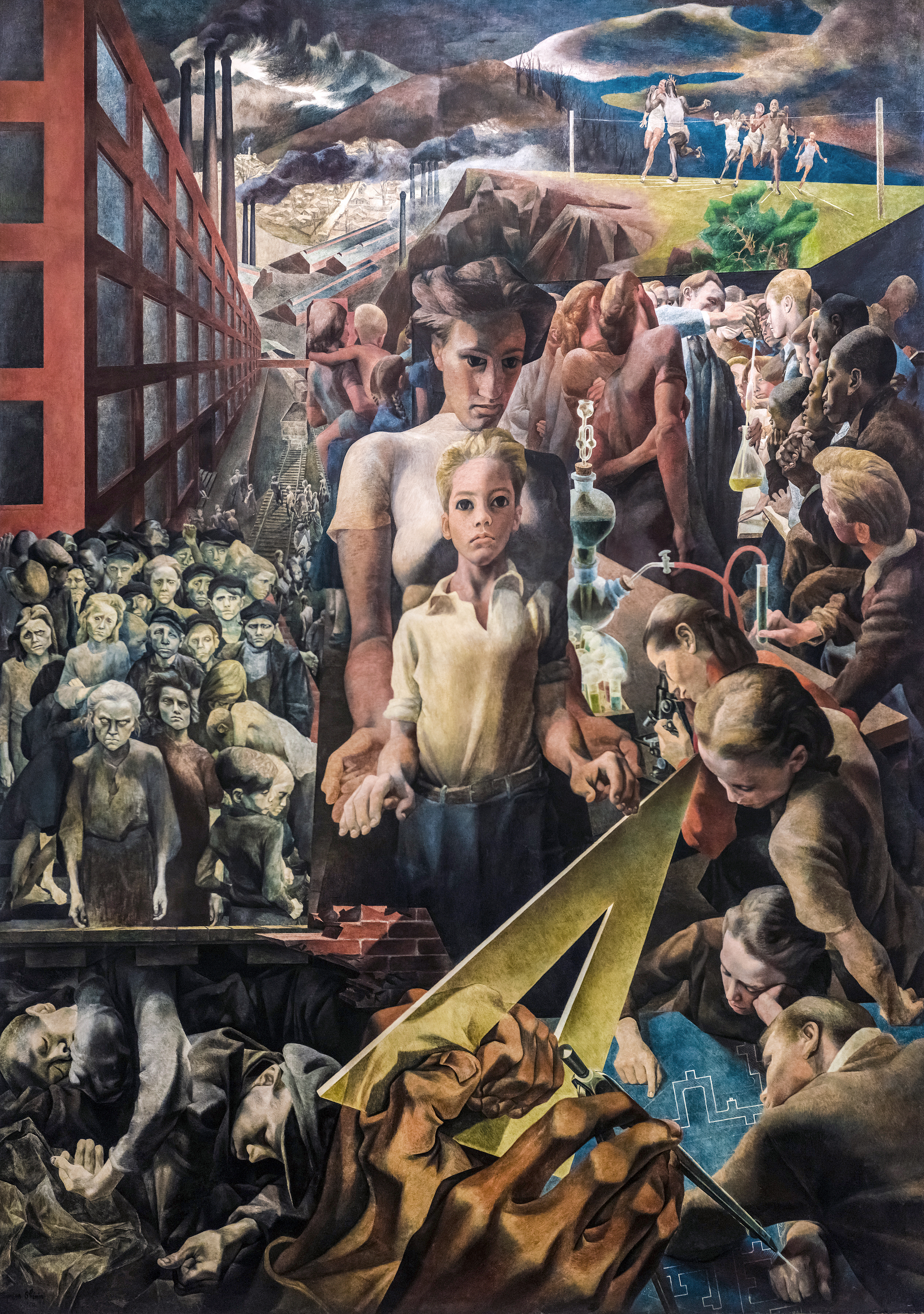
The mural Contemporary Justice and the Child created by Shimin in 1936 for the Department of Justice, in Washington DC. Tempera on fiberboard.

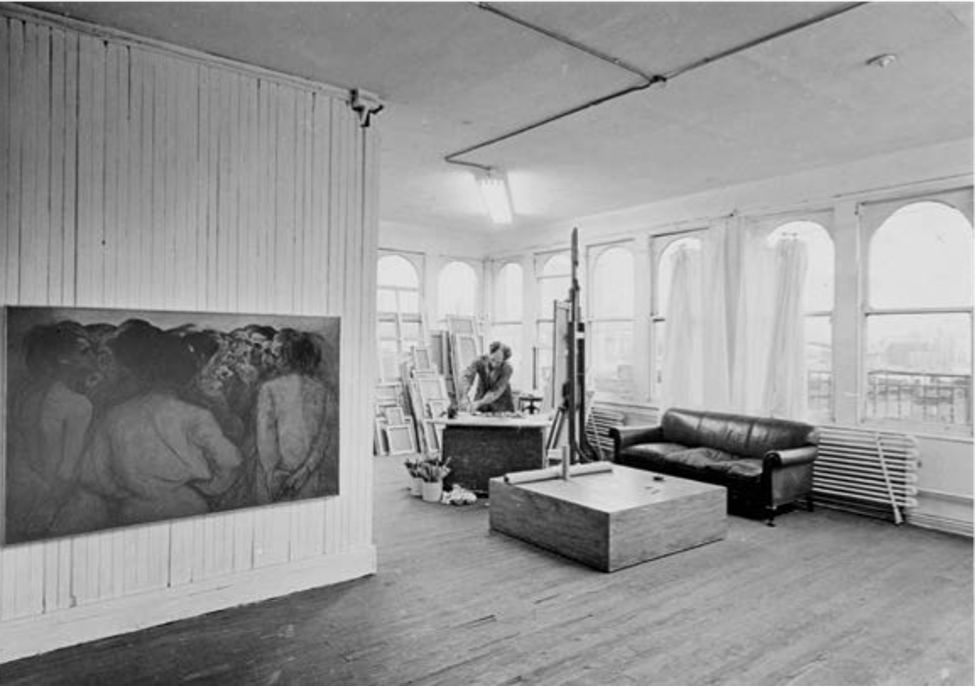
Shimin's Studio

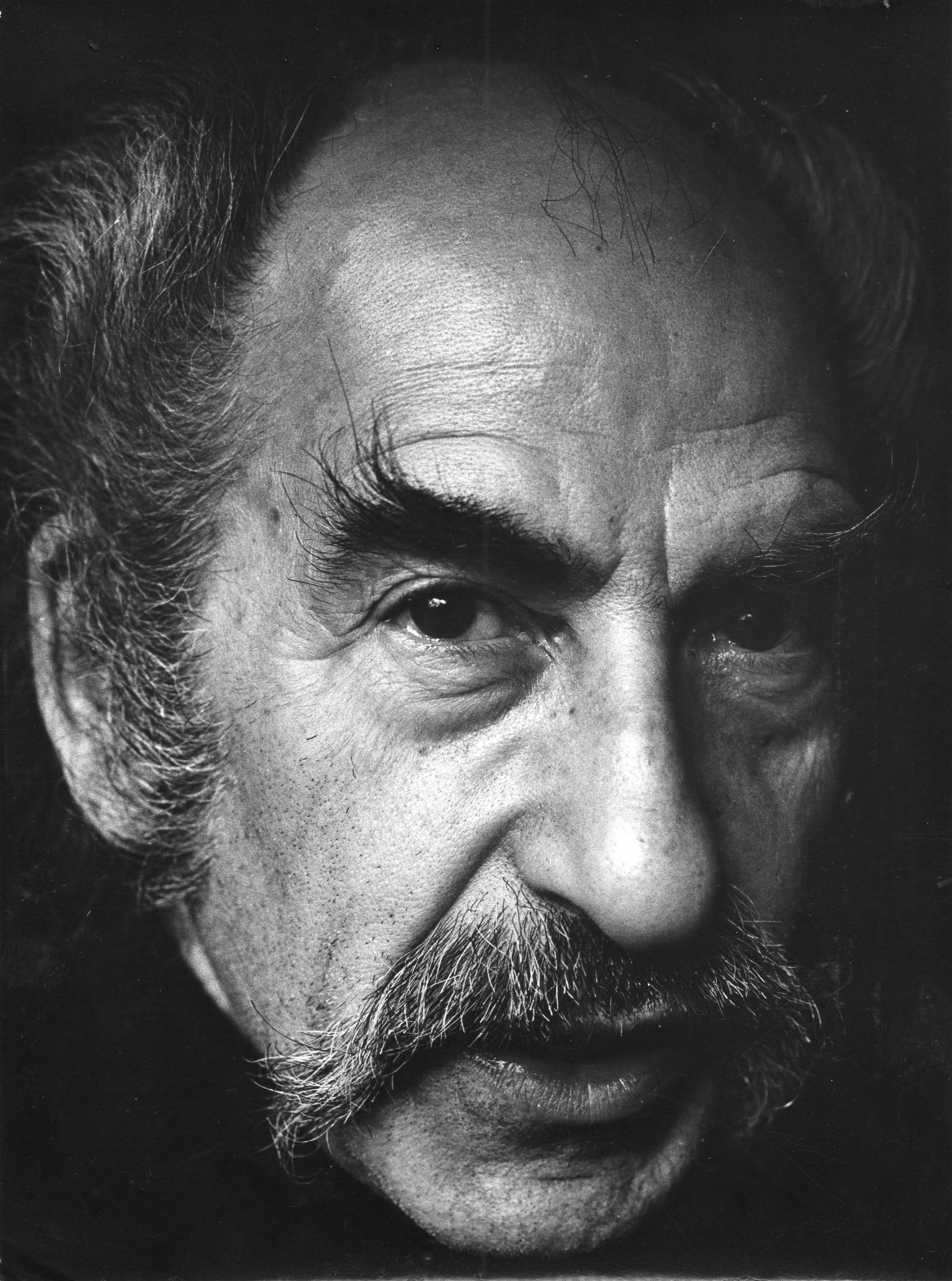
Symeon Shimin, Portrait
